= Jansenism =

Catholic theological movement

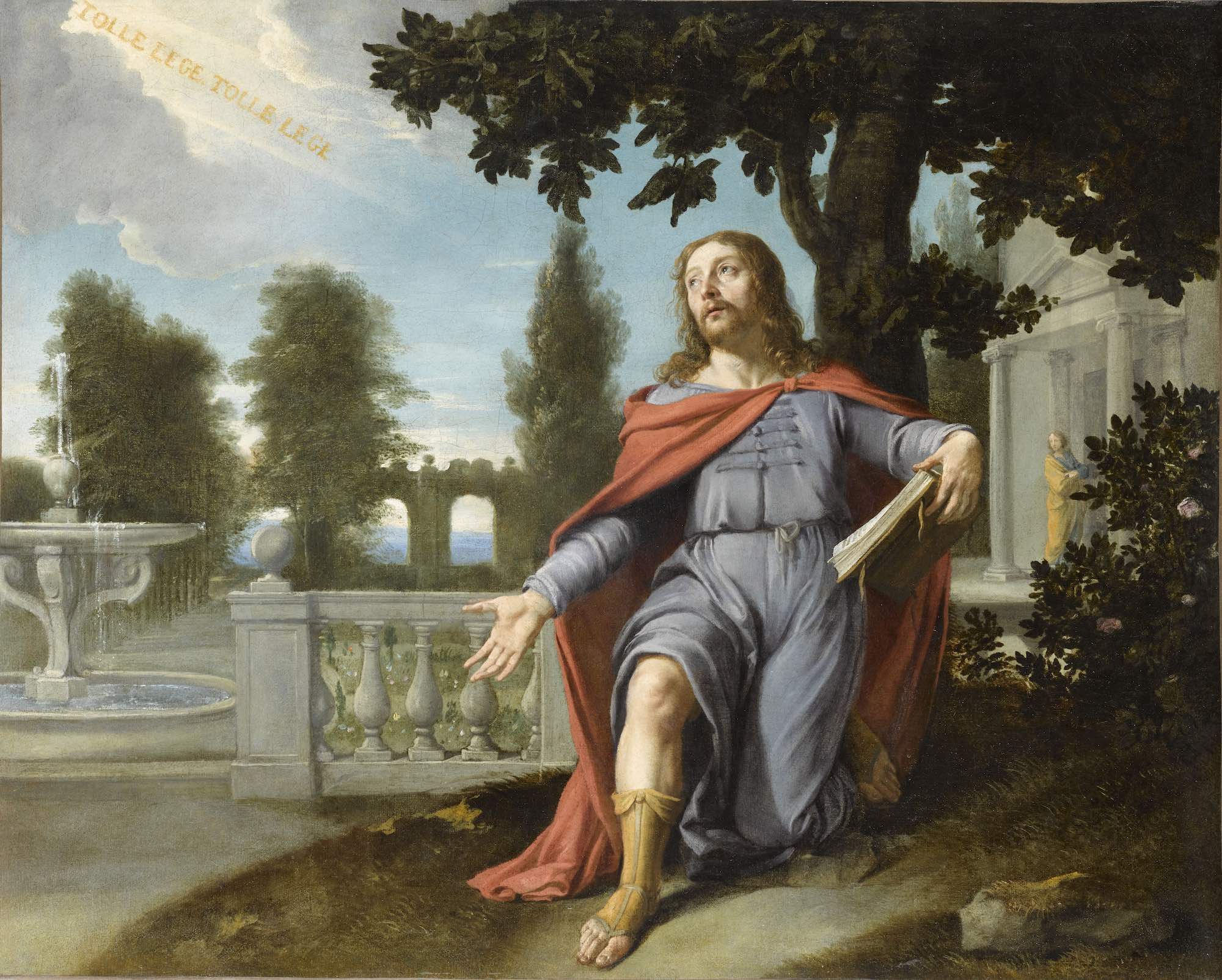
La Conversion de saint Augustin ('The Conversion of St. Augustine', c. 1650) by French Baroque painter and Jansenist Philippe de Champaigne

Jansenism was a 17th- and 18th-century Christian theological movement within the Catholic Church, rooted in the writings of Dutch bishop Cornelius Jansen, particularly in his book Augustinus published in 1640, which emphasized the necessity of divine grace and the limited role of human free will in salvation, drawing heavily on the doctrines of Augustine of Hippo. It emerged primarily in France and the Netherlands as a rigorist reaction against perceived moral and theological laxity associated particularly with the Society of Jesus.

Jansenists provoked lively debates, particularly in France, where five propositions, including the doctrines of limited atonement and irresistible grace, were decried as heretical by theologians hostile to Jansen. In 1653, Pope Innocent X condemned five ideas from Jansenism in the apostolic constitution Cum occasione, which made Jansenism officially heretical. Jansenists became linked to opposition to the French monarchy. This made them a target of King Louis XIV and pope Clement XI, who took strong actions against them. In 1708, the Abbey of Port-Royal, a center of Jansenist thought, was closed. In 1713, Clement XI issued the bull Unigenitus, which further condemned Jansenist teachings.

== Definition ==
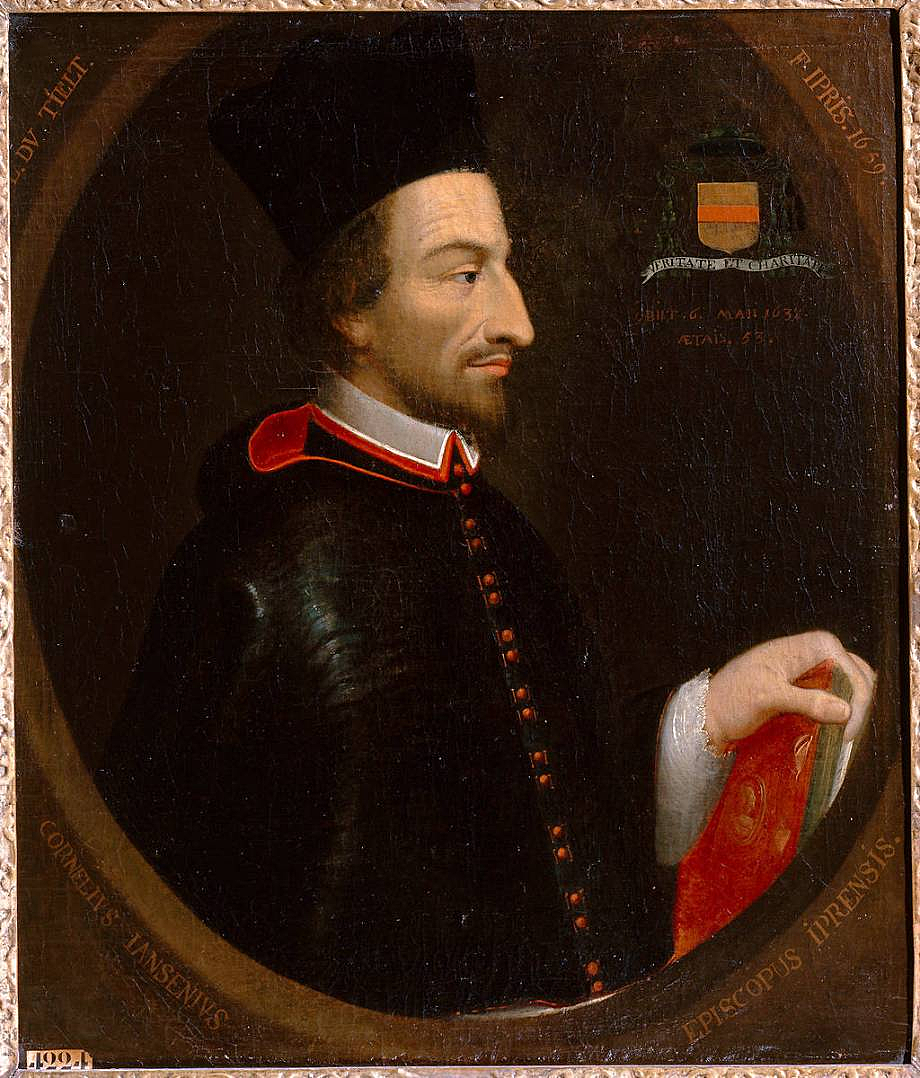
Cornelius Jansen (1585–1638), professor and rector magnificus of the Old University of Leuven, as well as namesake of Jansenism

The term 'Jansenism' was rejected by those called 'Jansenists', who throughout history consistently proclaimed their unity with the Catholic Church. Abbot Victor Carrière, precursor of contemporary studies of Jansenism, says the following.

There is perhaps no question more complicated than that of Jansenism. From the beginning, many of those who were rightly considered to be its legitimate representatives asserted that it does not exist [...]. Moreover, in order to escape the condemnations of the Church, to disarm certain attackers and win new adherents, it has, depending on the circumstances, attenuated or even modified its fundamental theses. Thus, despite the countless works devoted to it, the history of Jansenism in its entirety still remains to be written today, since the spirit of polemic has prevailed for two centuries.

Jansenism was first of all a defence of Augustinian theology in a debate initiated by the Protestant Reformation and the Council of Trent, then a concrete implementation of this Augustinianism. The struggle against ultramontanism and papal authority gave it a Gallican character, which became an essential component of the movement. In the absolutist France of the 17th and 18th centuries, the fear of a transition from religious opposition to a general opposition justified monarchical repression of Jansenism, and consequently, transformed the movement by giving it a political aspect marked by resistance to power and a defence of the parlements. In the 18th century, a diversity of 'Jansenisms' became more evident. In France, the participation of secular society in the movement revealed a popular and miraculous component involving figurism and the phenomenon of the convulsionnaires. In northern Italy, the influence of the Austrian Enlightenment brought Jansenism closer to modernity. However in the 19th century, Jansenism was primarily a defence of the past and a struggle against modern developments in the Catholic Church.

Augustin Gazier, historian of Jansenism and convinced Port-Royalist, attempts a minimal definition of the movement, removing the particularities to attribute a few common traits to all Jansenists: the subjection of one's whole life to a demanding form of Christianity, which gave a particular view of dogmatic theology, religious history and the Christian world. They harshly criticised developments in the church, but at the same time maintained an unshakeable loyalty to it.

Taking a broader view, the estimation of Marie-José Michel is that the Jansenists occupied an empty space between the ultramontane project of Rome and the construction of Bourbon absolutism.

French Jansenism is a creation of Ancien Régime society [...]. Developed from an Augustinian background very firmly anchored in France, it unfolds in parallel with the two great projects of French absolutism and the Catholic reformation [the Counter-Reformation]. Its development by part of the French religious and secular elites gives it an immediate audience never reached by the other two systems. It is thus rooted in French mentalities, and it truly survived as long as its two enemies, that is to say until the French Revolution for one, and until the First Vatican Council for the other.

Therefore Jansenism cannot be wholly encapsulated as a fixed theological doctrine defended by easily identifiable supporters claiming a system of thought, but rather, it represented the variable and diverse developments of part of French and European Catholicism in the early modern period.

The heresy of 'Jansenism', as stated by subsequent Roman Catholic doctrine, lies in the denial of the role of free will in the acceptance and use of grace. Jansenism asserts that God's role in the infusion of grace cannot be resisted and does not require human assent. The Catechism of the Catholic Church states the Catholic position that "God's free initiative demands man's free response", that is, humans are said to freely assent or refuse God's gift of grace.

== Origins ==
=== The question of grace in the post-Tridentine period ===
Jansenism originated from a theological school of thought within the framework of the Counter-Reformation, and appeared in the years following the Council of Trent, but drew from debates older than the council. Although Jansenism takes its name from Cornelius Jansen, it is attached to a long tradition of Augustinian thought.

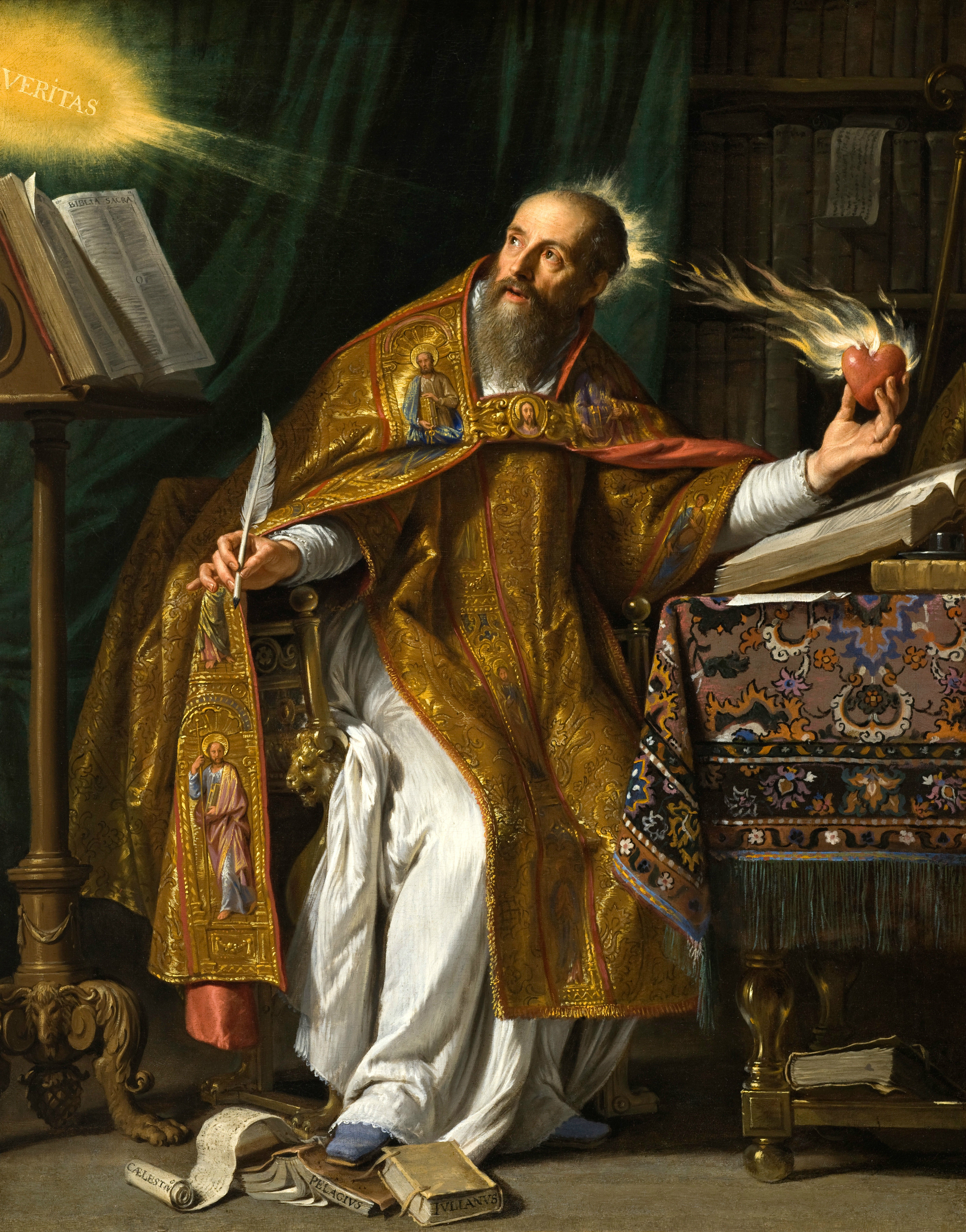
Augustine, (AD 354–430) bishop of Hippo, Church Father, who is claimed as the progenitor of the Jansenist doctrine of grace

Most of the debates contributing to Jansenism concern the relationship between divine grace (which God grants to man) and human freedom in the process of salvation. In the 5th century, the North African bishop Augustine of Hippo opposed the British monk Pelagius who maintained that man has, within himself, the strength to will the good and to practice virtue, and thus to carry out salvation; a position that reduces the importance of divine grace. Augustine rejected this and declared that God alone decides to whom he grants or withholds grace, which causes man to be saved. The good or evil actions of man (and thus, his will and his virtue) do not affect this process, since man's free will was lost as a result of the original sin of Adam. God acts upon man through efficacious grace, in such a way that he infallibly regenerates him, without destroying his will. Man thus receives an irresistible and dominant desire for the good, which is infused into him by the action of efficacious grace.

Medieval theology, dominated by Augustinian thought, left little room for human freedom on the subject of grace. Thomas Aquinas, however, attempted to organise a system of thought around Augustinianism in order to reconcile grace and human freedom. He both affirmed the action of the divine in each action of man, but also the freedom of man. The Scholastics of the 14th and 15th centuries moved away from Augustinianism towards a more optimistic view of human nature.

The Reformation broke with Scholasticism, with Martin Luther and John Calvin both taking Augustine as a reference, but also representing radical views. For some Augustinians, it was only necessary to affirm the omnipotence of God against human freedom (which Pelagianism overly exalted), whereas Luther and Calvin saw grace (freely granted or withheld by God) as causing man to be saved. Man's free will was therefore totally denied.

To counter the Reformation, the Roman Catholic Church in 1547 reaffirmed in the sixth session of the Council of Trent the place of free will, without pronouncing on its relationship with grace. Afterwards, the Roman Catholic position was not entirely unified, with the Jesuit priest Diego Laynez defending a position that his detractors described as Pelagian. Indeed, the Jesuits restarted the debate, fearing that excessive Augustinianism would weaken the role of the Church in salvation and compromise the rejection of Protestantism. In the wake of Renaissance humanism, certain Roman Catholics had a less pessimistic vision of man and sought to establish his place in the process of salvation by relying on Thomistic theology, which appeared to be a reasonable compromise between grace and free will. It is in this context that Aquinas was proclaimed a Doctor of the Church in 1567.

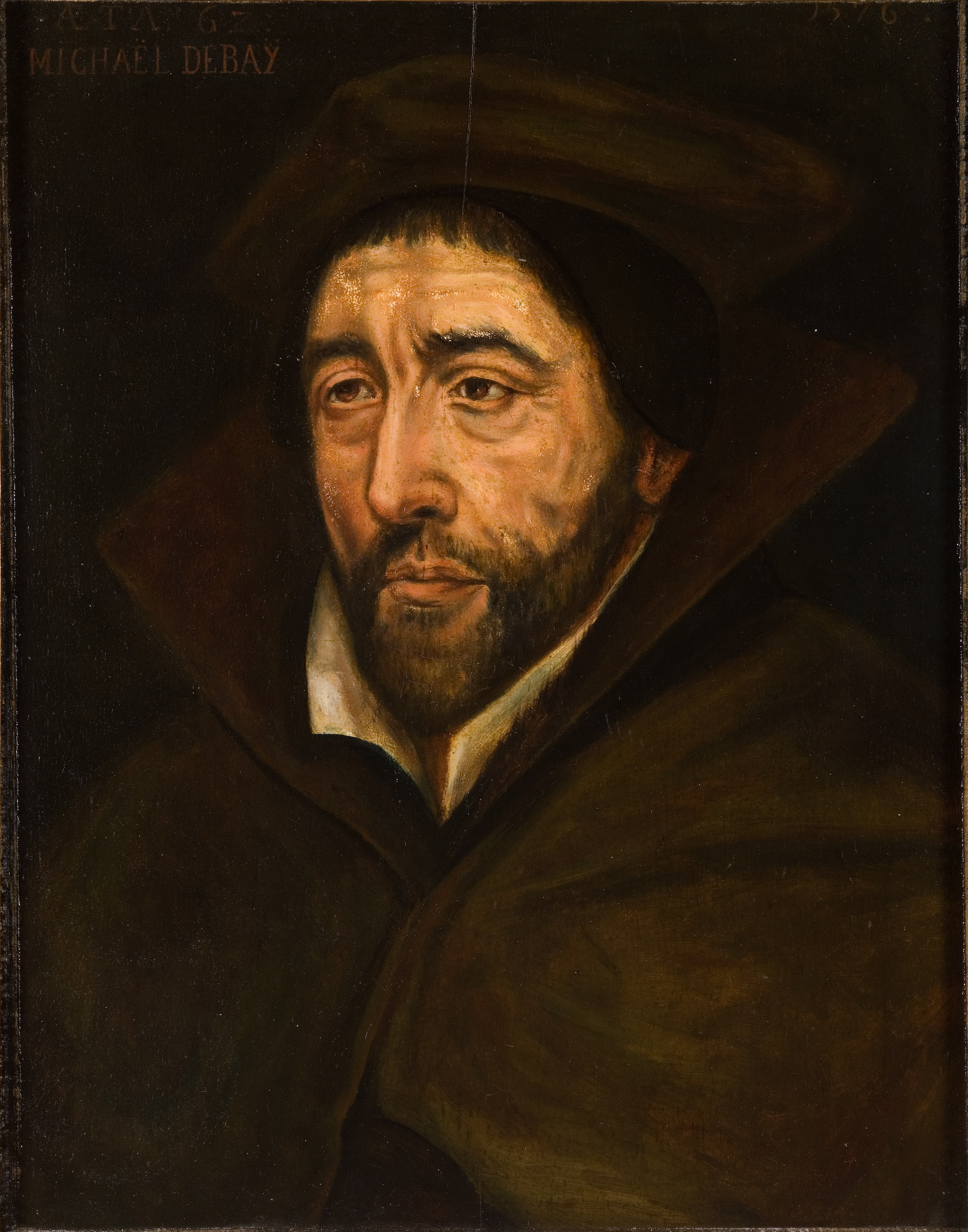
Michel de Bay (1513–1589), Augustinian Roman Catholic theologian, whose theological system known as Baianism was a forerunner to Jansenism

Nevertheless, theological conflict increased from 1567, and in Leuven, the theologian Michel de Bay (Baius) was condemned by Pope Pius V for his denial of the reality of free will. In response to Baius, the Spanish Jesuit Luis de Molina, then teaching at the University of Évora, defended the existence of 'sufficient' grace, which provides man with the means of salvation, but only enters into him by the assent of his free will. This thesis was violently opposed by the Augustinians, which resulted in the Sacred Roman and Universal Inquisition banning any publications on the problem of grace in 1611. The controversy was then concentrated in Leuven, where the Augustinian (Old) University of Leuven opposed the Jesuits. In 1628, Cornelius Jansen, then a professor at the university, undertook the creation of a theological work aimed at resolving the problem of grace by synthesising Augustine's thought on the matter. This work, a manuscript of nearly 1,300 pages with the title Augustinus, was almost completed when Jansen died suddenly in an epidemic in 1638. On his deathbed, he committed a manuscript to his chaplain, ordering him to consult with Libert Froidmont, a theology professor at Leuven, and Henricus Calenus, canon at the metropolitan church, and to publish the manuscript if they agreed it should be published, adding_{,} "If, however, the Holy See wishes any change, I am an obedient son, and I submit to that Church in which I have lived to my dying hour. This is my last wish." Jansen affirmed in Augustinus that since the Fall of man, the human will is capable only of evil without divine help. Only efficacious grace can make him live according to the Spirit rather than the flesh, that is to say, according to the will of God rather than the will of man. This grace is irresistible and not granted to all men. Here Jansen agreed with Calvin's theory of predestination. The manuscript was published in 1640, expounding Augustine's system and forming the basis for the subsequent Jansenist controversy. The book consisted of three volumes:

1. The first described the history of Pelagianism and Augustine's battle against it and against Semipelagianism;
2. The second discussed the fall of man and original sin;
3. The third denounced a 'modern tendency' (unnamed by Jansen but clearly identifiable as Molinism) as Semipelagian.

In the first decade of the 17th century, Jansen had established a fruitful collaboration with one of his classmates at the University of Leuven, the Baianist Jean du Vergier de Hauranne, later the abbot of Saint-Cyran-en-Brenne. Vergier was Jansen's patron for several years and, following the completion of their theological studies, in 1606 obtained for Jansen a position as a tutor in Paris. Two years later, he got Jansen a position teaching at the bishop's college in Vergier's hometown of Bayonne. The two studied the Church Fathers together in Bayonne, with a special focus on the thought of Augustine, until they both left Bayonne in 1617. The question of grace was not central to their works at that time. Jansen returned to the University of Leuven, where he completed his doctorate in 1619 and was named professor of exegesis. Jansen and Vergier continued to correspond about Augustine, especially concerning his teachings on grace. Upon the recommendation of King Philip IV of Spain, Jansen was consecrated as Bishop of Ypres in 1636. It was only after the publication of Augustinus in 1638 that Vergier became the chief proponent of Jansen's theses, initially more out of loyalty to his late friend than out of personal conviction.

=== A form of French Augustinianism—Vergier and the Arnaulds ===
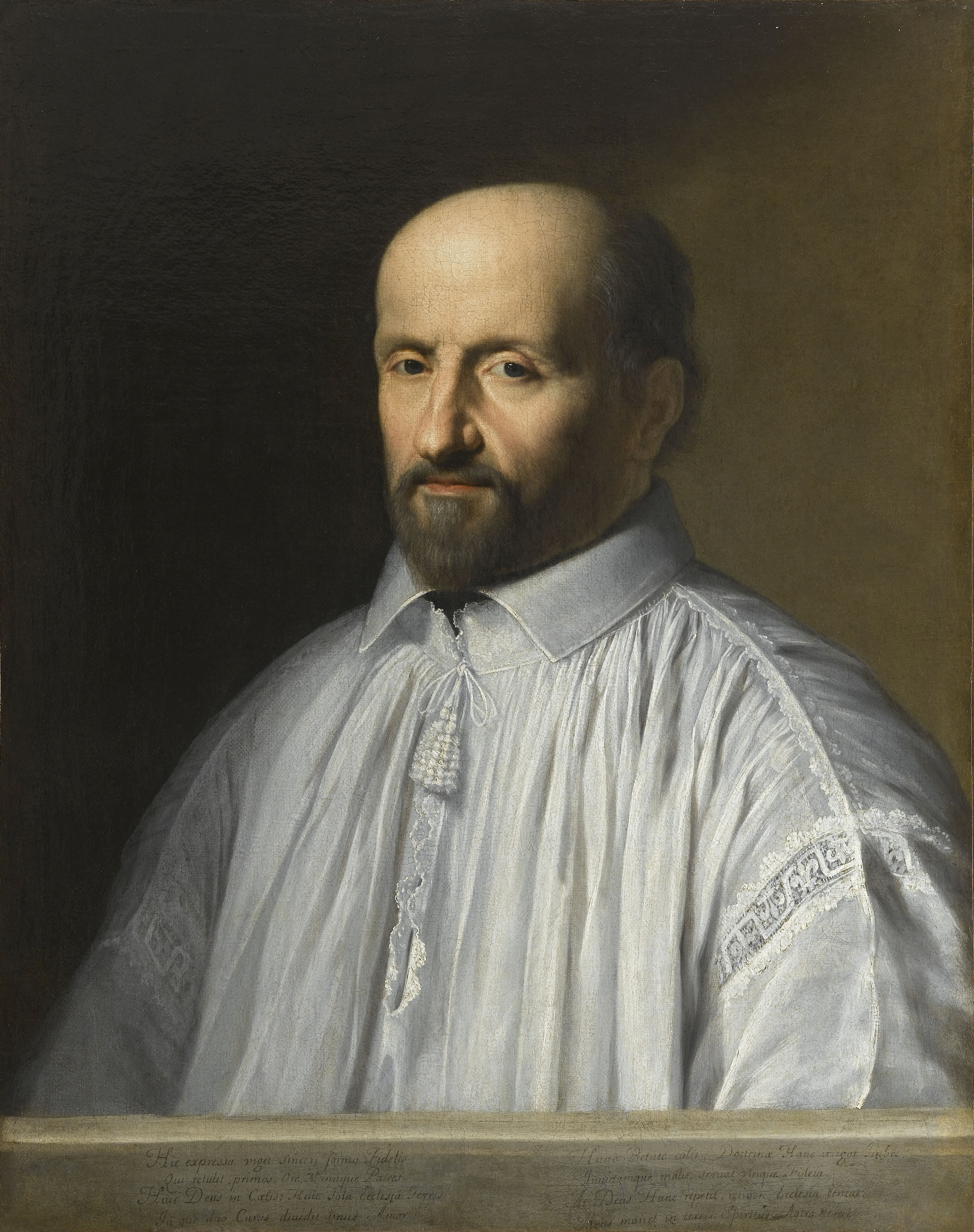
Abbé de Saint-Cyran – Jean du Vergier de Hauranne (1581–1643), abbot of Saint Cyran Abbey in Brenne, one of the intellectual fathers of Jansenism

Until then, grace was not frequently debated among French Roman Catholics; the topic was overshadowed by the devastating French Wars of Religion. The Jesuits were also banished from the kingdom between 1595 and 1603, so the Augustinian doctrine had no real opponents.

At the beginning of the 17th century, the principal religious movement was the French school of spirituality, mainly represented by the Oratory of Jesus founded in 1611 by Cardinal Pierre de Bérulle, a close friend of Vergier. The movement sought to put into practice a certain form of Augustinianism without focusing on the question of grace as the Jansenists would later do. Its emphasis was to bring souls to a state of humility before God through the adoration of Christ as Saviour. Although Bérulle interfered little in the debates on grace, the Oratory and the Jesuits still came into conflict, with Vergier taking part by publishing writings against the 'Molinists'. Moreover, Bérulle, after having been the ally of Cardinal Richelieu, became his enemy when he realised Richelieu was not so much seeking the victory of Roman Catholicism in Europe, but rather seeking "to construct a political synthesis which would ensure the universal supremacy of the French monarchy"; placing himself in alignment with the royal jurists. When Bérulle died in 1629, Richelieu transferred his hostility towards Vergier, mainly due to a theological debate regarding contrition (which had not been settled by the Council of Trent) that disinclined him to Vergier, making him, at least on this point, an ally of the Jesuits.

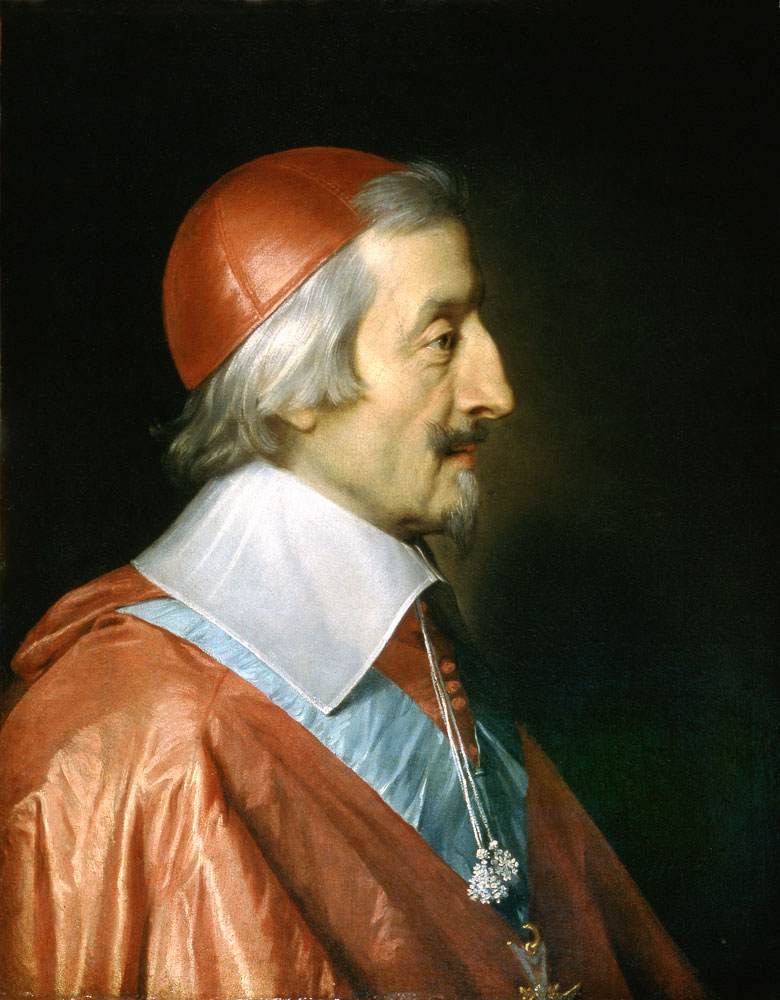
Cardinal Richelieu (1585–1642), French statesman, prelate of the Roman Catholic Church and one of the early opponents of Jansenism

Vergier in his writings insisted on the necessity of a true 'inner conversion' (perfect contrition) for the salvation of a Christian; the only way, according to him, to be able to receive the sacraments of penance and the Eucharist. This process of inner conversion, called the practice of 'renewals', is necessarily long and, once the state of conversion has been reached, the penitent must make the graces he has received bear fruit, preferably by leading a life of retreat. This notion of an inner conversion is related to the doctrine of contrition in the remission of sins: that is, it was considered necessary to express love for God in order receive the sacraments. In opposition to Vergier, Richelieu, in his book Instruction du chrétien ('Instruction of the Christian', 1619), along with the Jesuits, supported the thesis of attrition (imperfect contrition): that is, for them, the "regret for sins based solely on the fear of hell" is sufficient for one to receive the sacraments. The idea that the Eucharist should be received very infrequently, and that reception required much more than freedom from mortal sin, remained influential until it was finally condemned in the early 20th century by Pope Pius X, who endorsed frequent communion, as long as the communicant was free of mortal sin.

In 1602, Marie Angélique Arnauld, from the noble Arnauld family of Paris, became abbess of Port-Royal-des-Champs, a Cistercian convent in Magny-les-Hameaux. There, she reformed discipline after a conversion experience in 1608. In 1625, most of the nuns moved to Paris, forming the convent of Port-Royal de Paris. In 1634, after coming into contact with the Arnaulds, Vergier became the spiritual advisor of Port-Royal-des-Champs. There he put into practice his Augustinian vision of salvation, becoming in the process a good friend of Angélique Arnauld and convincing her of the rightness of Jansen's opinions. In 1637, Antoine Le Maistre, nephew of Angélique Arnaud, retreated to Port-Royal in order to immerse himself fully in the demanding spiritual practices he had learned from Vergier. He thus became the first of the Solitaires of Port-Royal, and his example would be followed by other pious men wishing to live in isolation.

The two convents became major strongholds of Jansenism. Under Angélique Arnauld, later with Vergier's support, Port-Royal-des-Champs developed a series of elementary schools, known as the Petites écoles de Port-Royal ('Little Schools of Port-Royal'); the most famous product of these schools was the playwright Jean Racine. Through Angélique Arnauld, Vergier had met her brother, Antoine Arnauld, became his protector and brought him to accept Jansen's position in Augustinus. Following Vergier's death in 1643, Antoine Arnauld, by then a brilliant lawyer, priest and theologian at the Sorbonne (theological college of the University of Paris), became the chief proponent of Jansenism.

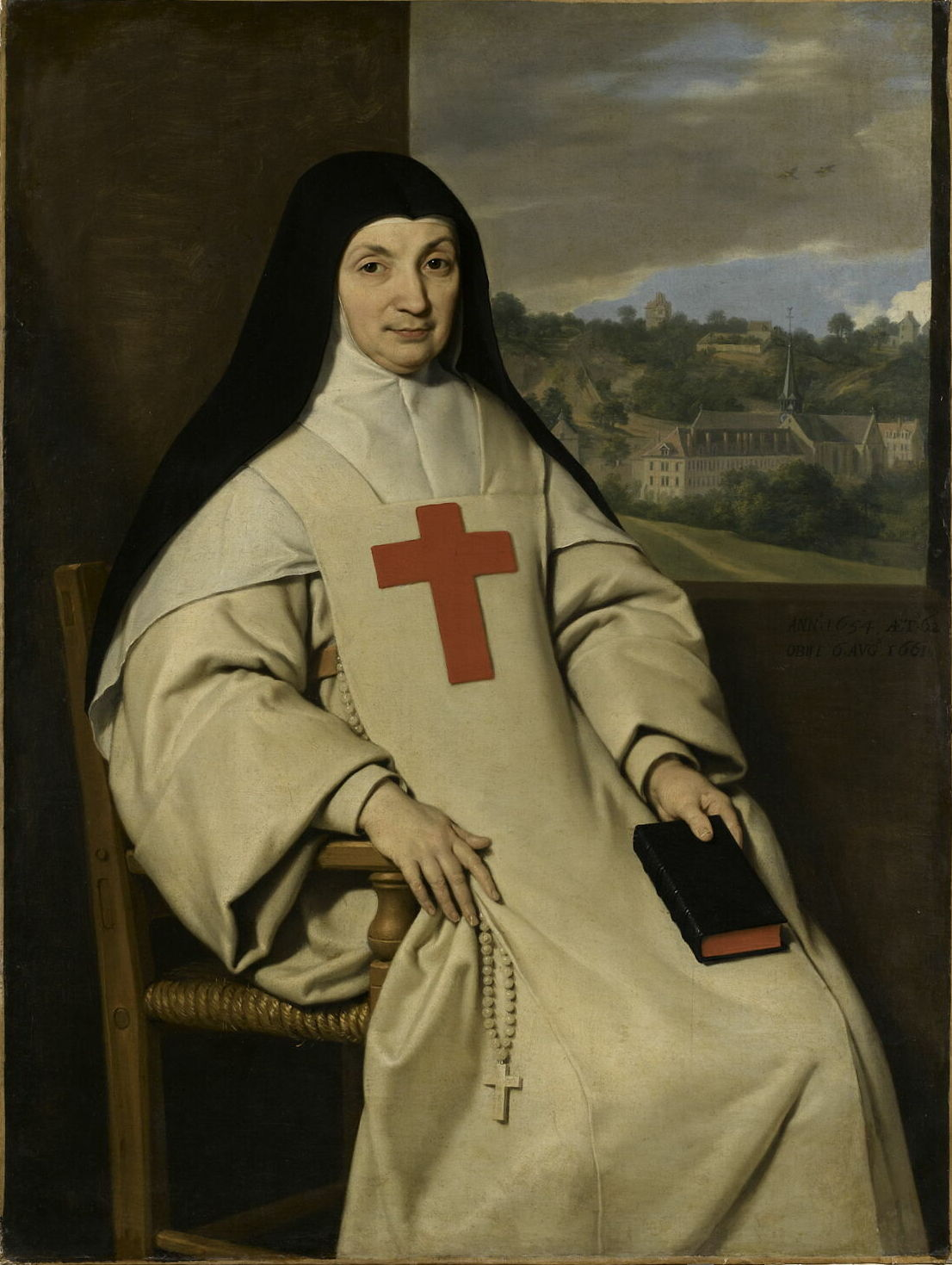
La mère – Marie Angélique Arnauld (1591–1661), abbess of Port-Royal-des-Champs

By allying with the Protestant princes against the Roman Catholic princes in the Thirty Years' War, Richelieu aroused the suspicion of the devout Jansenists, leading Vergier to condemn openly his (R.'s) foreign policy. For this, Vergier was imprisoned in the Bastille in May 1638. The debate on the role of contrition and attrition in salvation was also one of the motives for his imprisonment. Vergier was not released until after Richelieu's death in 1642, and he died shortly thereafter, in 1643.

From 1640, the Jesuits condemned Vergier's practice of renewals, which, according to them, risked discouraging the faithful and therefore distancing them from the sacraments. The Jesuits encouraged the faithful, whether or not they were struggling with sin, to receive the Eucharist frequently; arguing that Christ instituted it as a means to holiness for sinners, and that the only requirement for receiving Communion (apart from baptism) was that the communicant be free of mortal sin at the time of reception. Antoine Arnauld responded to them in 1643 with De la fréquente communion ('Of frequent communion'), representing the deeply pessimistic theology of Jansenism, in which he opposed frequent Communion; arguing that a high degree of perfection, including purification from attachment to venial sin, was necessary before approaching the sacrament. Arnaud presented Jansen's ideas to the public in a more accessible form (e.g., his work was written in the vernacular, whereas Augustinus was written in Latin). His book was approved by fifteen bishops and archbishops, as well as twenty-one theologians of the Sorbonne and was widely distributed except in Jesuit circles.

In 1644, Antoine Arnauld published an Apologie pour Jansenius ('Apology for Jansenius'), then a Seconde apologie ('Second apology') in the following year, and finally an Apologie pour M. de Saint-Cyran ('Apology for Saint-Cyran [i.e., Vergier]'). Arnauld also replied to Jesuit criticism with Théologie morale des Jésuites ('Moral Theology of the Jesuits'). The Jesuits then designated Nicolas Caussin (former confessor of Louis XIII) to write Réponse au libelle intitulé La Théologie morale des Jésuites ('Response to the libel titled Moral Theology of the Jesuits') in 1644. Another Jesuit response was Les Impostures et les ignorances du libelle intitulé: La Théologie Morale des Jésuites ('The impostures and ignorance of the libel titled Moral Theology of the Jesuits') by François Pinthereau, under the pseudonym of "abbé de Boisic", also in 1644. Pinthereau also wrote a critical history of Jansenism, La Naissance du Jansénisme découverte à Monsieur le Chancelier ('The Birth of Jansenism Revealed to the Chancellor') in 1654. During the 1640s, Vergier's nephew, Martin de Barcos, who was once a theology student under Jansen, wrote several works defending his uncle.

== The reception of Augustinus in France ==
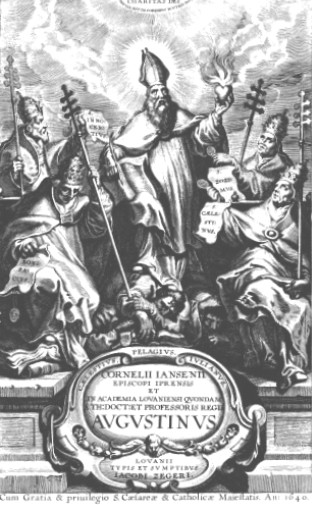
The title page of Augustinus by Cornelius Jansen, published posthumously in 1640. The book formed the foundation of the subsequent Jansenist controversy.

Augustinus was first printed in France in 1641, then a second time in 1643, and was read widely in theological circles, including in Spanish Flanders and the Dutch Republic. The debate regarding Augustinianism in France was mainly introduced by the publication of Augustinus, in which emphasis is placed on the Augustinian theory of grace and predestination.

The Oratorians and Dominicans welcomed the work, along with a large number of theologians at the Sorbonne, ten of which approved the French editions. But the Jesuits immediately opposed it; they were supported by Cardinal Richelieu, and after his death in 1642, by Isaac Habert who attacked Jansen in his sermons at the Notre-Dame de Paris, and by the Feuillant theologian Pierre de Saint-Joseph who published a Defensio sancti Augusti ('Defence of Saint Augustine') in 1643.

These first years were not favourable to the Jansenists. The Archbishop of Paris, Jean-François de Gondi, forbade the treatment of grace in publications and formally proscribed Augustinus, but it nevertheless continued to circulate. On 1 August 1642, the Inquisition issued a decree condemning Augustinus and forbidding its reading. The decree was powerless in France since the tribunal was unrecognised by the law. On 6 March 1642, Pope Urban VIII followed up with a papal bull titled In eminenti, which condemned Augustinus because it was published in violation of the order that no works concerning grace should be published without the prior permission of the Holy See. He also renewed the censures by Pope Pius V, in Ex omnibus afflictionibus in 1567, and by Pope Gregory XIII, of several propositions of Baianism, arguing that they were repeated in Augustinus.

In eminenti was, for a time, treated as invalid because of an alleged ambiguity about the date of its publication. Jansenists attempted to prevent the reception of In eminenti, both in Flanders and in France. They alleged that it could not be genuine, since the document attested to be promulgated at Rome on 6 March 1641, whereas the copy sent to Brussels by the nuncio at Cologne was dated in 1642. In reality, the difference was between the Old Style and New Style dates which were both still in use. Thanks to the agitation of the Jansenists in the Parlement, its publication in France was delayed until January 1643. The faculty of the Sorbonne formally accepted the bull in 1644.

== The five propositions ==
The opponents of Jansenism wanted Augustinus to be more thoroughly condemned, since the Jesuits especially considered Jansenism to be heretical in the vein of Calvinism. Isaac Habert, ally of the late Richelieu, who became Bishop of Vabres, published in December 1646 a list of eight propositions taken from the Augustinus that he considered heretical. A few years later, in 1649, the syndic of the Sorbonne, Nicolas Cornet, frustrated by the continued circulation of Augustinus, drew up a list of five propositions from the work and two from De la fréquente communion, then asked the Sorbonne faculty to condemn the propositions. Jansen's name was not explicitly mentioned, but it was obvious to all that he was being condemned.

The cunning cyndic was careful not to give precise statements, as loyalty made it a duty; he did not attribute these propositions to anyone, and if anyone were to pronounce the name of Jansen, he would even say that it was not a question of him, Non agitur de Jansenio, [It is not about Jansen], whereas inwardly, it was Jansen and him alone who was in question.

Before the faculty could condemn the propositions, the parlement of Paris intervened and forbade the faculty to consider the propositions. The faculty then submitted the propositions to the Assembly of the French clergy in 1650. Consequently, Habert wrote to Pope Innocent X the same year, mentioning five of the initial seven propositions. In his letter, he does not directly mention Jansen, but describes the trouble caused in France by the publication of his work. The five propositions were not formally attributed to Jansen. The letter provoked controversy; more than ninety French bishops signed it, but it was immediately countered by thirteen Augustinian prelates, who wrote a letter of refutation to Rome. In this letter, the prelates denounced the five propositions as "composed in ambiguous terms, which could only produce heated arguments", and requested the pope to be careful not to condemn Augustinianism too hastily, which they considered to be the official doctrine of the Church on the question of grace. Among these bishops were Henri Arnauld, bishop of Angers and brother of Antoine Arnaud, and Nicolas Choart de Buzenval, bishop of Beauvais, who would later show fervent support for Port-Royal. At the same time, Antoine Arnaud openly doubted the presence of the five propositions in the work of Jansen, introducing the suspicion of manipulation on the part of the opponents of the Jansenists.

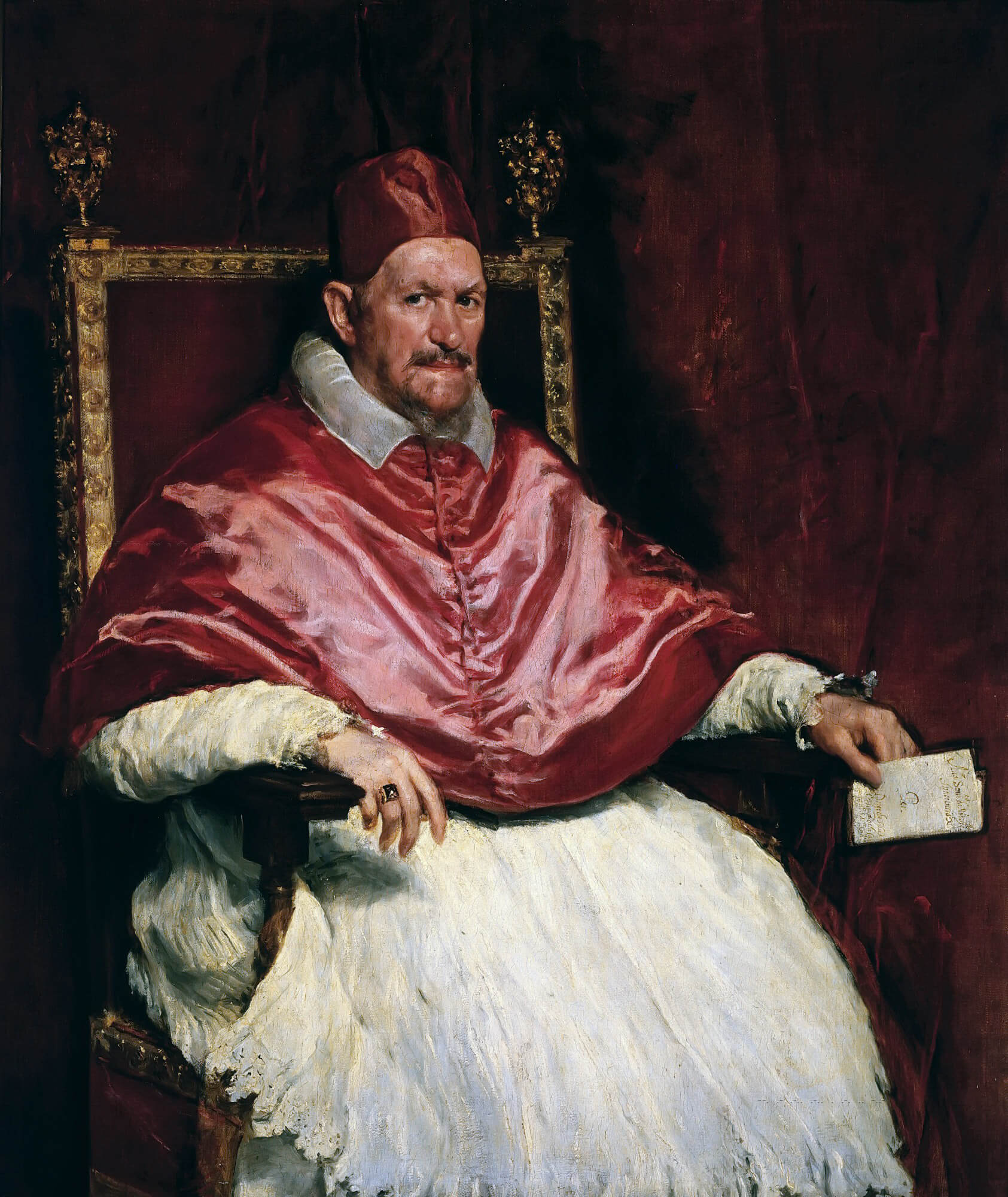
Pope Innocent X (1574–1655), Roman pontiff who promulgated Cum occasione in 1653, condemning five propositions of Jansenism as heretical

The prelates also asked Innocent X to appoint a commission similar to the Congregatio de Auxiliis to resolve the situation. Innocent X agreed to the majority's request, (that is, the request of the ninety bishops) but in an attempt to accommodate the view of the minority, appointed an advisory committee consisting of five cardinals and thirteen consultors to report on the situation. Over the next two years, this commission held 36 meetings including 10 presided by Innocent X. The supporters of Jansenism on the commission drew up a table with three heads: the first listed the Calvinist position (which was condemned as heretical), the second listed the Pelagian/Semipelagian position (as taught by the Molinists), and the third listed the correct Augustinian position (according to the Jansenists). Nevertheless, in 1653, Innocent X sided with the majority and condemned the propositions, promulgating in the form of a papal bull the apostolic constitution Cum occasione. The first four propositions were declared heretical and the fifth false.

1. That there are some commands of God that just persons cannot keep, no matter how hard they wish and strive, and they are not given the grace to enable them to keep these commands;
2. That it is impossible for fallen persons to resist interior grace;
3. That it is possible for human beings who lack free will to merit;
4. That the Semipelagians were correct to teach that prevenient grace was necessary for all interior acts, including for faith, but were incorrect to teach that fallen humanity is free to accept or resist prevenient grace; and;
5. That it is Semipelagian to say that Christ died for all.

The bull was received favourably in France. Some Jansenists including Antoine Arnaud admitted that the propositions are heretical, but argued that they could not be found in Augustinus. They maintained that Jansen and his Augustinus were orthodox, as they espoused only what Augustine himself taught, and they believed it was impossible that the pope could have condemned Augustine's opinion. Arnauld articulated a distinction as to how far the Church could bind the mind of a Roman Catholic. He argued that there is a distinction between matters de jure and de facto: that a Roman Catholic was obliged to accept the Roman Catholic Church's opinion as to a matter of law (i.e., as to a matter of doctrine), but not as to a matter of fact. Arnauld argued that, while he agreed with the doctrine propounded in Cum occasione, he was not bound to accept the pope's determination of fact as to what doctrines were contained in Jansen's work. The Jansenists were therefore content with the notion that Jansen himself was not openly condemned, and further that Augustine's doctrine was still considered orthodox. This displeased the Jesuits and their supporters, who wanted a thoroughgoing condemnation of Jansenism. While the theological problem was technically resolved by Rome, hostility between the Jansenists and the Jesuits became increasingly pronounced.

== The controversies between the Jansenists and the Molinists ==
Even before the promulgation of Cum occasione, tensions between Jansenists and Jesuits defending Luis de Molina's thesis, the Molinists, had begun. In August 1649, Antoine Singlin, a priest near Port-Royal, preached on the occasion of the Feast of St. Augustine in Port-Royal. In his sermon, he emphasised efficacious grace, thus violating the order of his bishop who had forbidden the issue to be discussed. The ensuing controversy involved many Jansenists, in particular Henri Arnauld, bishop of Angers.

After the promulgation of the bull, the Jesuits exploited what was for them a victory, and restarted hostilities. In 1654, the Jesuit François Annat published the Chicanes des jansénistes ('Deceits of the Jansenists'), in which he expressed the idea that the pope had in fact condemned Augustinian doctrine, and that the five propositions were indeed contained in Augustinus. Antoine Arnaud immediately responded, analysing the propositions and trying to show that they were inaccurate summaries of Jansen's views.

Cardinal Mazarin, in order to put an end to the hostilities, convoked the bishops in 1654 and then in 1655, demanding them to sign a declaration condemning the doctrine of Jansen. He recommended the signing of a similar declaration by all the clergy, but the bishops are quite reluctant, so Mazarin's demand remained unfulfilled in the majority of dioceses.

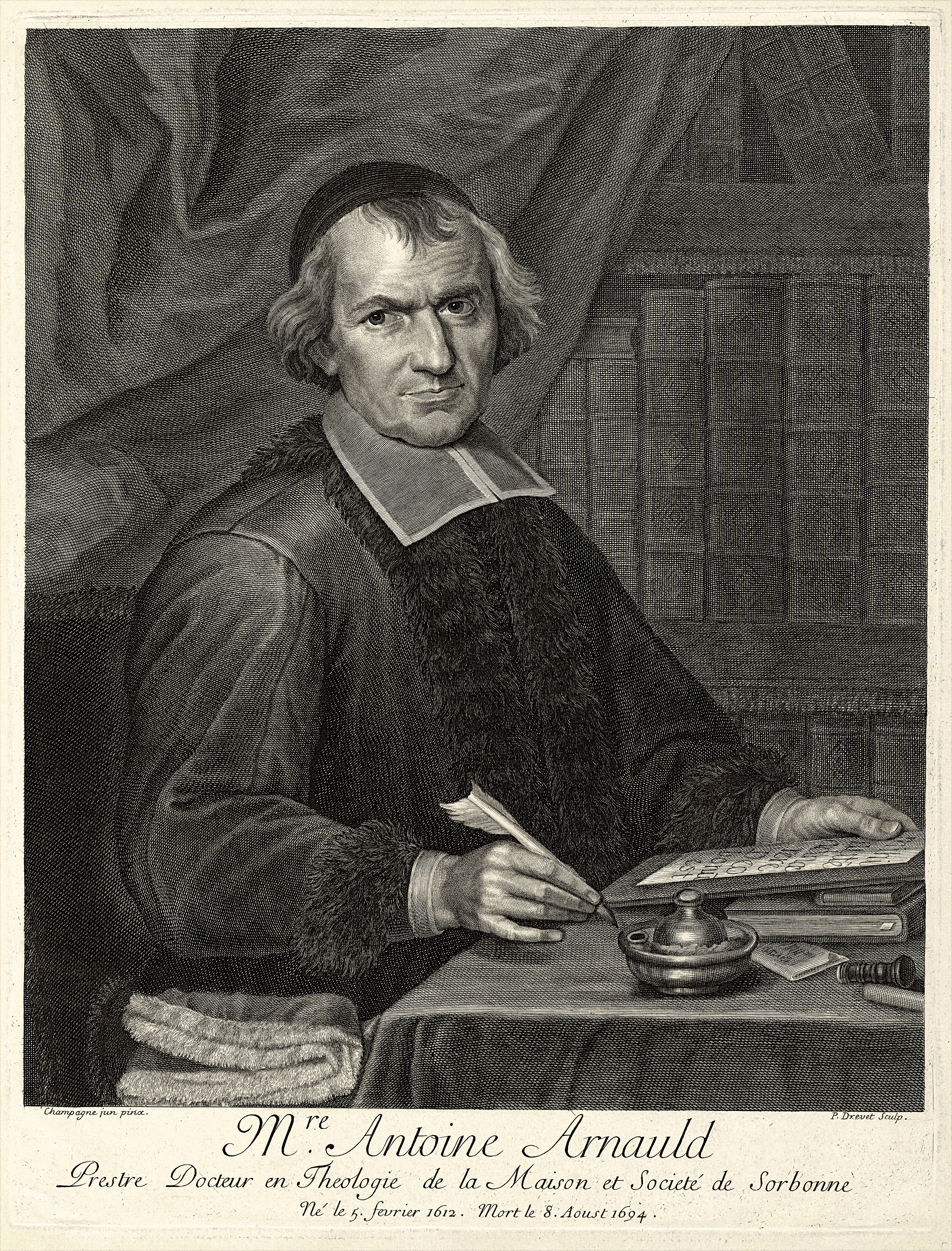
Antoine Arnauld (1612–1694) became the leader of the Jansenists following Vergier's death in 1643.

The first consequence of this attempt was the scandal involving the Duke of Liancourt (Roger du Plessis-Liancourt, Duke of La Roche-Guyon, known as the Duke of Liancourt). In January 1655, this ally of the Jansenists (his only granddaughter was a boarder at Port-Royal,) was refused absolution by a vicar of the Saint-Sulpice parish in Paris because of his Jansenist connections. Antoine Arnauld responded to this by publishing two pamphlets, Lettre à une personne de condition ('Letter to a person of status', addressed to Liancourt) and Seconde lettre à un duc et pair ('Second letter to a duke and peer', addressed to the Duke of Luyne). He denounced the arbitrariness of the vicar's action and condemned the Jesuits, who were, according to him, adherents to a 'lax morality', in plotting against Augustine's doctrine of grace. Arnauld declared that he assented to the papal condemnation in Cum occasione, but remained silent on whether the condemned propositions could be attributed to Jansen. He openly disputed the concept of 'sufficient grace' defended by the Molinists.

The clarity of Arnauld's explication ironically prompted his adversaries to ask the College of Sorbonne to examine his last letter. The professors who were responsible for examining the letter were all openly hostile to Augustinianism. They extracted two propositions from the letter which were then condemned. On 31 January 1656, shockingly, Arnauld was barred from the Sorbonne, despite sixty professors having come to his defence. This event pushed Arnauld to retreat to Port-Royal, where he devoted himself to writing with a promising young theologian, Pierre Nicole. At the same time, Blaise Pascal undertook to defend him before public opinion, initiating the campaign with his Lettres Provinciales.

Later that year, the French Assembly of the Bishops voted to condemn Arnauld's distinction regarding the pope's ability to bind the mind of believers in matters of doctrine (de jure) but not in matters of fact (de facto). They asked Pope Alexander VII to condemn Arnauld's proposition as heretical. Alexander VII responded, in the apostolic constitution Ad sanctam beati Petri sedem promulgated in 1656, that "We declare and define that the five propositions have been drawn from the book of Jansenius entitled Augustinus, and that they have been condemned in the sense of the same Jansenius and we once more condemn them as such."

== Blaise Pascal and the campaign of the Provinciales ==
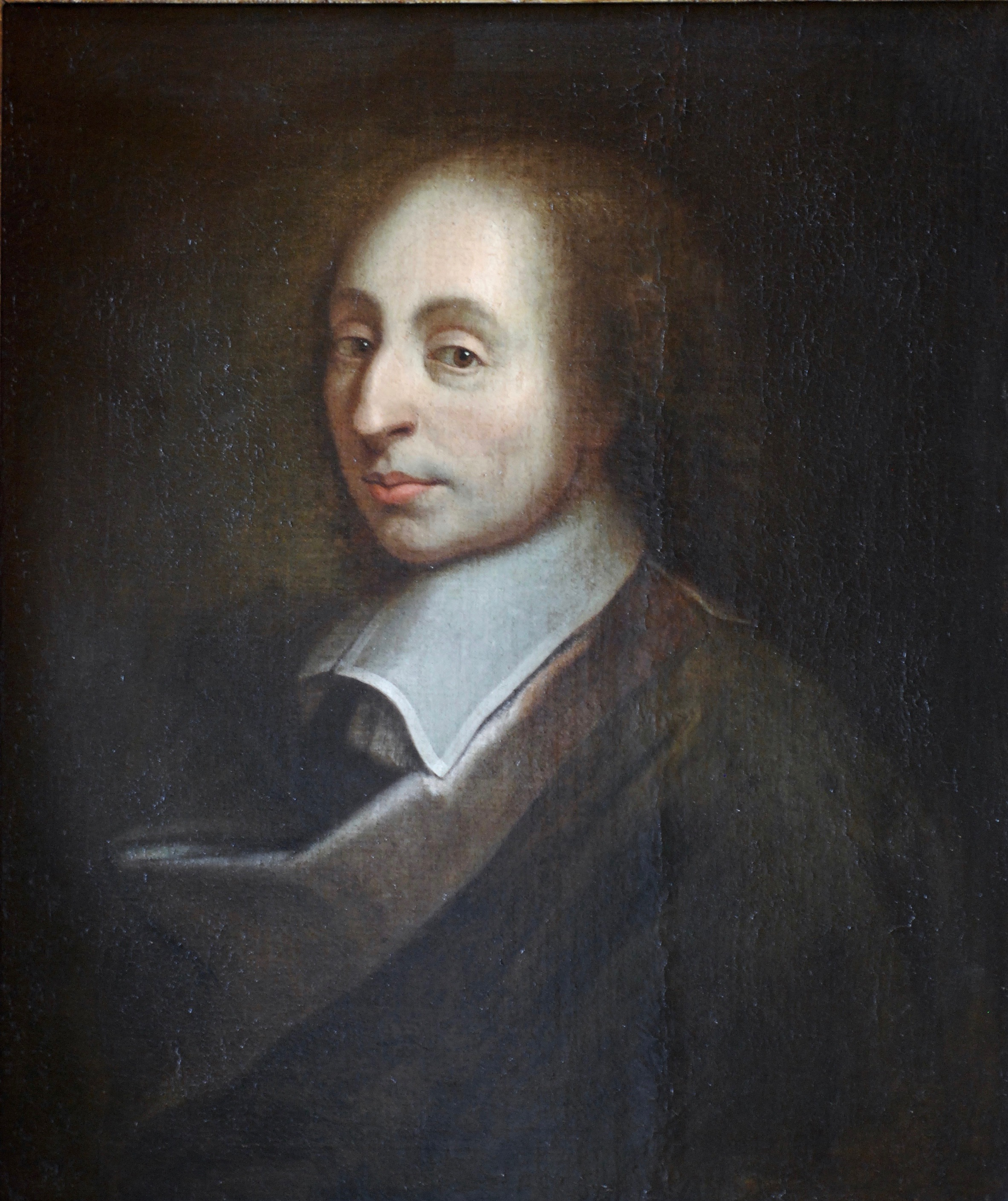
Blaise Pascal (1623–1662). The Jansenist apologia Provincial Letters, written 1656 and 1657, a literary masterpiece written from a Jansenist perspective, and remembered for the denunciation of the casuistry of the Jesuits.

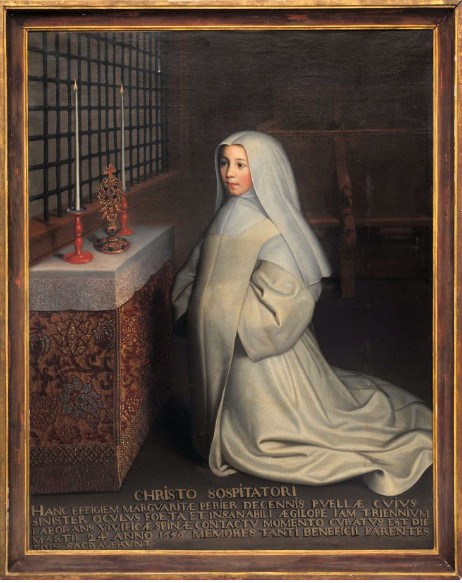
Marguerite Périer (1646–1733), French Jansenist nun and niece of Pascal

When the censure of the Second letter to a duke and peer and the condemnation of Antoine Arnauld were certain, Blaise Pascal entered the controversy on the side of the Jansenists. He decided to devote himself to religion a little over a year before. His sister Jacqueline Pascal was one of the major figures at Port-Royal, and he himself had numerous dialogues with the Solitaires (notably the famous conversation with Louis-Isaac Lemaistre de Sacy on Epictetus and Michel de Montaigne).

Pascal was invited by Arnauld to bring the matter before public opinion. On 23 January 1656, nine days before the first official condemnation of Arnauld, a fictional letter titled Lettre écrite à un provincial par un de ses amis, sur le sujet des disputes présentes à la Sorbonne ("Letter written to a provincial by one of his friends, on the subject of the present disputes at the Sorbonne"), was published secretively and anonymously. Seventeen other Provinciales followed, and on 24 March 1657, Pascal made a contribution to a work titled Écrits des curés de Paris ("Writings of Parisian priests"), in which the moral laxity of the Jesuits was condemned.

In his Provinciales, Pascal denies the existence of a 'Jansenist party'. According to Augustin Gazier, "for the author of the Little Letters, it was a matter of disabusing an overly credulous public, and of bringing out in all its light the perfect orthodoxy of those whom slander represented as heretics. Pascal did not hesitate to say that so-called 'Jansenism' was a chimera, a crude and abominable invention of the Jesuits, bitter enemies of Saint Augustine and of grace effective in itself."

The Provinciales were a comprehensive defence of Augustinanism and an apology for Port-Royal, but they are best known for their ironical attacks made against the Jesuits, echoing Arnauld's Théologie morale des Jésuites (although unlike Arnauld, Pascal did not accede to Cum occasione but believed that the condemned doctrines were orthodox. Nevertheless, he emphasised Arnauld's distinction about matters de jure and de facto). They achieved great success among the cultured who formed public opinion at that time, as they appreciated Pascals' ridicule of the Jesuits, casuists and Molinists. If the first three letters are directly linked to the convictions of Antoine Arnauld, the following ones have a different purpose, since Pascal saw his convictions justified and so went on the counterattack. He violently attacked the Jesuits accused of advocating moral laxity. These letters, described as 'divine' by Marquess of Sévigné, were a campaign to change public opinion, turning the public away from theological questions towards the denigration of the supposed moral laxity of the Jesuits. This was not received well by certain Jansenists, who saw in the attacks contained in the letters a breach of Christian charity.

The placement of the letters in the Index of Prohibited Books by Rome represents a context in which Jansenism was moving away from a theological quarrel to a movement increasingly known and established in the secular world. According to Gazier, the main reason for this prohibition was not the theology (which was 'unassailable'), nor even the attacks against the Jesuits, but rather the fact that religious debates were raised in public, "the doctrinal part of the Provinciales is unassailable; they could not be censored by the Sorbonne or condemned by the popes, and if they were put in the Index, like the Discourse on the Method [of René Descartes], it was because they were disapproved of for having treated, in French, for the people of the world and for women, contentious questions of which only scholars should have been aware."

The 'miracle of Saint-Épine', which occurred on 24 March 1656, was effective in reducing the attacks against Jansenism and popularising it among the public. The niece of Pascal, Marguerite Périer, a boarder at Port-Royal, was cured of a lacrimal fistula that disfigured her, after having interacted with a relic of Saint-Épine. The Jansenists saw this as divine approval, and, with the Roman Catholic Church officially recognising the healing as a miracle, they were at peace for the moment.

While the Church in France had left the quarrel aside, it was on the political front that the Jansenists became seriously worried.

== Political opposition to Jansenism ==
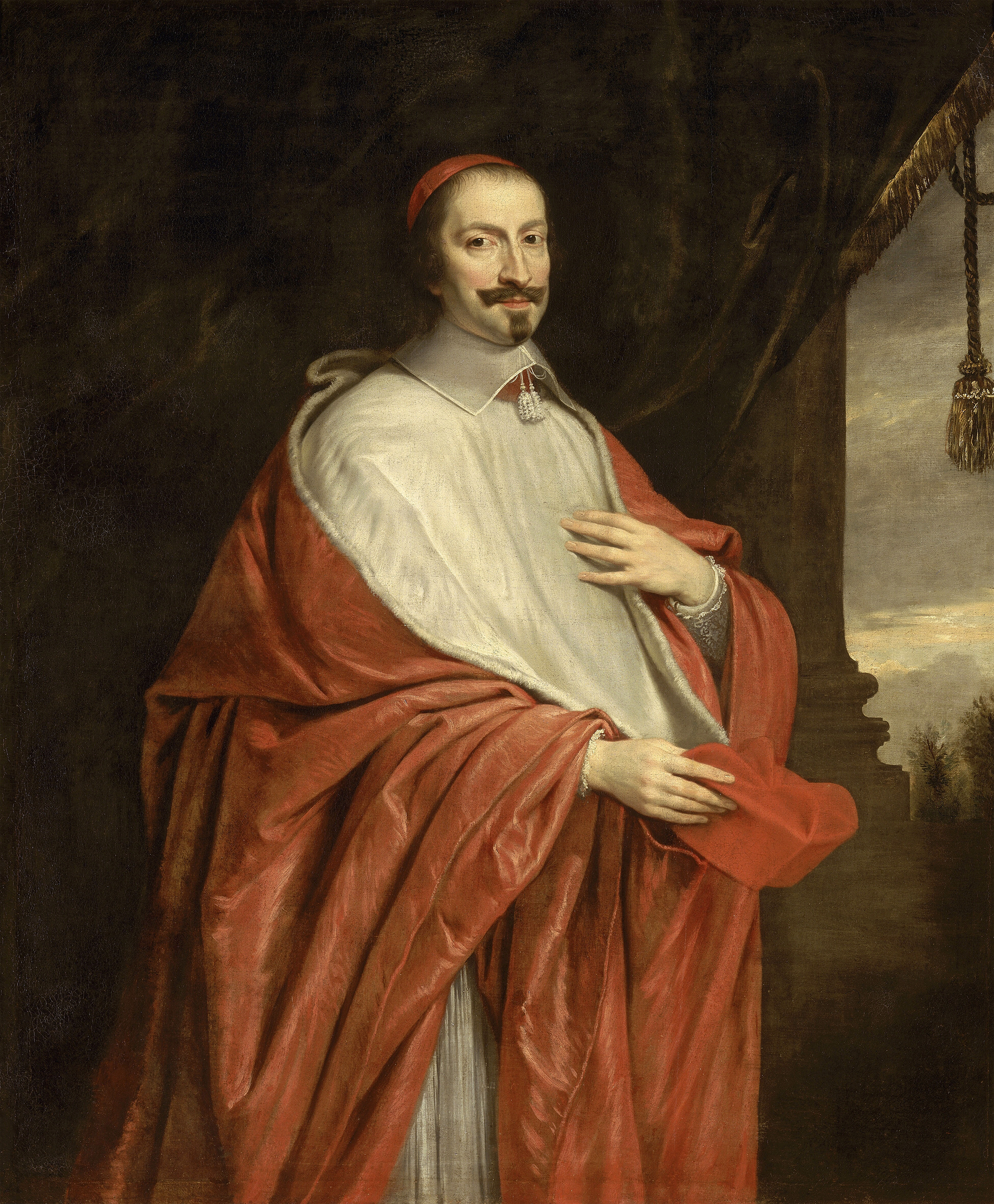
Cardinal Mazarin (1602–1661), Italian Catholic prelate who served as chief minister to Louis XIII and Louis XIV until his death in 1661, and prominent opponent of Jansenism

Though initially religious, the opposition to Jansenism quickly gained a political aspect. Upon the death of Louis XIII in 1643, Cardinal Mazarin took the same positions as his predecessor Richelieu in combatting the 'Jansenist party'. The 'Jansenist party' tended to attract former Frondeurs after the failure of their revolt in 1653. Although the Jansenists were not involved in the Fronde, they were quickly associated with the revolt because of the support they received from nobles such as Anne Geneviève de Bourbon, Duchess of Longueville (who had a house built in Port-Royal-des-Champs) and her brother Armand de Bourbon, Prince of Conti. The Arnauld family was suspected of being linked to the parliamentary Fronde. In addition, the actions of certain Solitaires to abandon worldly life and to withdraw completely from the Court worried Mazarin, who saw it as a possible source of political dissent.

In 1657, the Assembly of the French clergy, relying on Ad sanctam beati Petri sedem, drew up a formula of faith condemning Jansenism. The Assembly declared that signing the formula was compulsory for all French clergy. Many Jansenists remained firmly committed to Arnauld's distinction between matters de jure and de facto, and refused to sign. The Petites écoles de Port-Royal (the 'Little Schools of Port-Royal') were thus dissolved. The archbishop of Paris, Hardouin de Péréfixe de Beaumont, went several times to the monastery of Port-Royal to urge the nuns to sign the formula, but in vain. He therefore interdicted them from receiving the sacraments on 21 August 1664. This was a severe condemnation of Jansenism. A few days later, the leaders of the Jansenists were forced outside the monastery, then all the nuns who refused to sign were kept together at Port-Royal-des-Champs, while the nuns who did sign were gathered at the monastery in Paris.

Mazarin did not manage to fight effectively against Jansenism; rather it would be Louis XIV who achieved the near-total suppression of the movement. Early in his reign he was haunted by the memory of the Fronde, which proved to be his strongest opponent upon his true assumption of power in March 1660. In December 1660, he brought Mazarin together with the presidents of the Assembly asked them to proceed with coercing the clergy to sign the formula. The signing of the formula, which reiterated the condemnation of the five propositions by Innocent X in Cum occasione, was, according to Jean-Pierre Chantin, "a true test of orthodoxy imposed upon the entire clergy". The Jansenists and the nuns of Port-Royal were divided as to what attitude to adopt. Antoine Arnauld applied the distinction between matters de jure and de facto; he agreed to condemn the propositions, but maintained reservations about their presence within Augustinus. However, the ecclesiastical authorities rejected this distinction. Many priests and nuns refused to sign the formula.

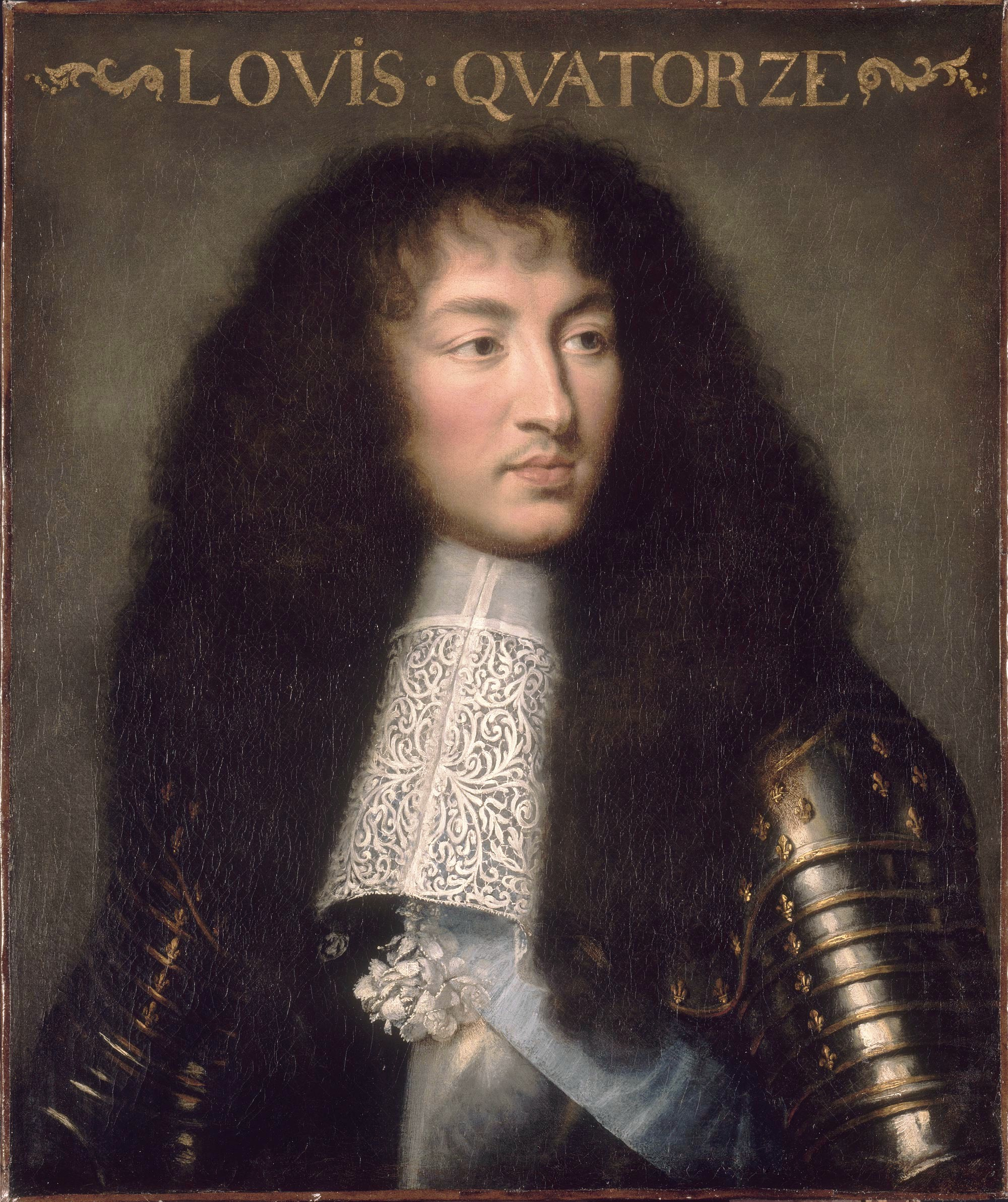
Louis XIV (1638–1715), King of France from 1643 to 1715, who took up the mantle of both the religious and political repression of Jansenism from Cardinal Mazarin

As soon as Mazarin died, on 9 March 1661, Louis XIV ordered the dispersion of the novices and residents of the monasteries of Port-Royal-des-Champs and Port-Royal de Paris. The convent was also forbidden to accept new novices, which guaranteed that it would eventually die out. Affairs were further complicated by several bishops who also desired to maintain the distinction between matters de jure and de facto regarding the formula. This was the case with four noteworthy bishops, who were condemned by Rome and Louis XIV: François-Étienne Caulet, bishop of Pamiers, Nicolas Pavillon, bishop of Alès, Nicolas Choart de Buzenval, bishop of Beauvais and Henri Arnauld, Bishop of Angers.

=== Formulary controversy: 1664–1669 ===
At the urging of several bishops, and at the personal insistence of King Louis XIV, Pope Alexander VII sent to France the apostolic constitution Regiminis Apostolici in 1664, which required, according to the Enchiridion symbolorum, "all ecclesiastical personnel and teachers" to subscribe to an included formulary, the Formula of Submission for the Jansenists.

The formula was the basis of the Formulary Controversy. Many Jansenists refused to sign it; while some did sign, they made it known that they were agreeing only to the doctrine (matters de jure), not the allegations asserted by the bull (matters de facto). The latter category included the four Jansenist-leaning bishops, who communicated the bull to their flocks along with messages that maintained the distinction between doctrine and fact. This angered both Louis XIV and Alexander VII, who commissioned nine French bishops to investigate the situation.

Alexander VII died in 1667 before the commission concluded its investigation and his successor, Pope Clement IX, initially appeared willing to continue the investigation of the nine Jansenist-leaning bishops. However, in France, Jansenists conducted a campaign arguing that allowing a papal commission of this sort would constitute a renouncement of the traditional liberties of the Gallican Church, thus playing on traditional French opposition to ultramontanism. They convinced one member of the cabinet (Lyonne) and nineteen bishops of their position. These bishops argued, in a letter to Clement IX, that the infallibility of the Church applied only to matters of revelation, and not to matters of fact. They asserted that this was the position of Caesar Baronius and Robert Bellarmine. They also argued in a letter to Louis XIV that allowing the investigation to continue would result in political discord.

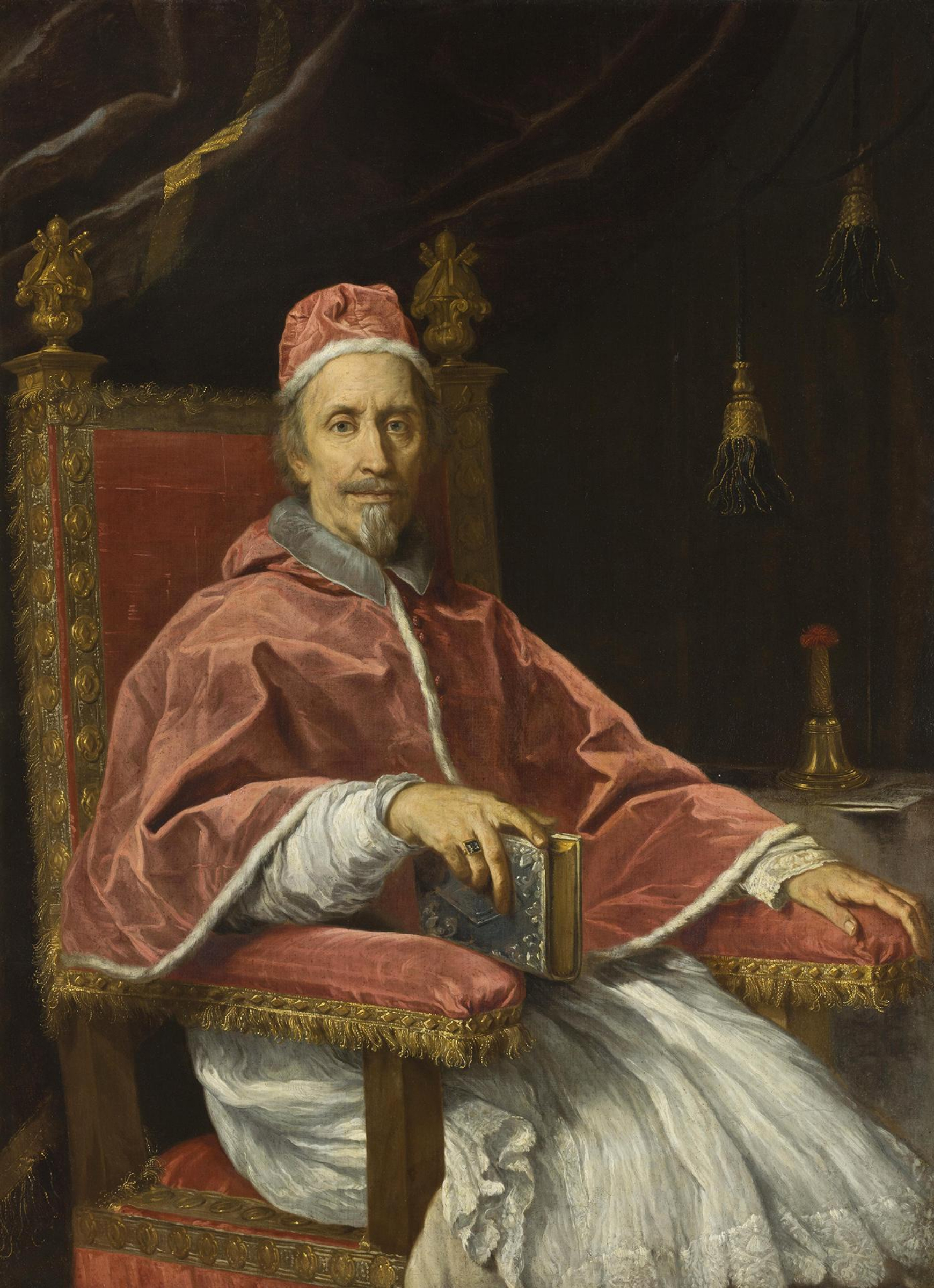
Pope Clement IX (1600–1669), whose intervention in the Formulary Controversy led to a 32-year lull (1669–1701) in the controversy over Jansenism known as the Clementine Peace

Under these circumstances, the papal nuncio to France recommended that Clement IX accommodate the Jansenists. Clement agreed, and appointed César d'Estrées, Bishop of Laon, as a mediator in the matter. Two bishops who had signed the letter to the pope, Louis Henri de Pardaillan de Gondrin, Archbishop of Sens, and Félix Vialart de Herse, Bishop of Châlons-sur-Marne, assisted d'Estrées. D'Estrées convinced the four bishops, Arnauld, Choart de Buzenval, Caulet and Pavillon, to sign the Formula of Submission for the Jansenists (though it seems they may have believed that signing the formulary did not mean assent to the matters de facto that it contained). The pope, initially happy that the four bishops had signed, became angry when he was informed that they had done so with reservations. Clement IX ordered his nuncio to conduct a new investigation. Reporting back, the nuncio declared: "they have condemned and caused to be condemned the five propositions with all manner of sincerity, without any exception or restriction whatever, in every sense in which the Church has condemned them". However, he reported that the four bishops continued to be evasive as to whether they agreed with the pope as to the matter de facto. In response, Clement IX appointed a commission of twelve cardinals to further investigate the matter. This commission determined that the four bishops had signed the formula in a less than entirely sincere manner, but recommended that the matter should be dropped to forestall further divisions in the Church. Foreign wars also pressured Louis XIV to avoid internal conflict. The pope agreed and thus issued four briefs, declaring the four bishops' agreement to the formula was acceptable, thus instituting the Paix clémentine ('Clementine Peace') which lasted from 1669 to 1679.

== The Clementine Peace ==
Although the peace of Clement IX was a lull in the public theological controversy, several clergymen remained attracted to Jansenism. Three major groups were:

1. The duped Jansenists, who continued to profess the five propositions condemned in Cum occasione;
2. The fin jansénistes, who accepted the doctrine of Cum occasione but who continued to deny the infallibility of the Church in matters de facto;
3. The quasi-Jansenists, who formally accepted both Cum occasione and the infallibility of the Church in matters de facto, but who nevertheless remained attracted to aspects of Jansenism, notably its stern morality, commitment to virtue, and its opposition to ultramontanism, which was also a political issue in France in the decades surrounding the 1682 Declaration of the clergy of France. They served as protectors of the 'duped Jansenists' and the fins jansénistes.

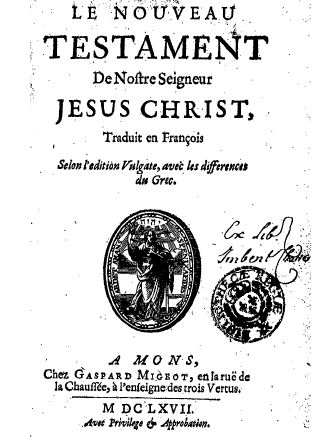
The title page of the Bible de Port-Royal ('Port-Royal Bible' or 'Sacy Bible'), published from 1667 to 1696, a masterpiece of classical French form, largely written during the Clementine Peace by the Jansenist Louis-Isaac Lemaistre de Sacy

During the Clementine Peace, the Jansenists tried to avoid unnecessary controversy, especially since the growing absolutism of Louis XIV made the attraction of former Frondeurs to Port-Royal and Jansenism suspect. This is why Blaise Pascal's Pensées (published posthumously in 1670) and Pierre Nicole's Essais de morale et d'instruction théologiques ('Essays on moral and theological instruction') are devoid of any theological or political controversy. The Jansenists at this time distinguished themselves by the quality of their intellectual work and by their desire to communicate matters of religion to the faithful. Louis-Isaac Lemaistre de Sacy thus published a French New Testament in 1667. Published secretively in Mons (in the Spanish Netherlands), it was condemned by the pope in 1668 because it translated the sacred text into the vernacular and with allegedly Jansenising edits. He then undertook a translation of the Vulgate, starting in 1672, which was not completed until 1695. These thirty volumes are considered an essential text in Biblical scholarship. The Bible de Sacy ('Sacy Bible'), like Pascal's Pensées, is considered to be a reputable example of the classical French language of the 17th century.

Despite this intense intellectual activity, Charles Augustin Sainte-Beuve, in his work Port-Royal, rightly says that it was only a period of respite before further troubles.

The ten years which followed the Clementine Peace were for Port-Royal ten years of glory, fundamentally of decline, but of a veiled, embellished decline; these were the beautiful hours of a sweet autumn, of a rich and warm sunset. In an instant, solitude bloomed again and became commonplace, more enamelled than ever. The old spirit within continued and adapted again without much struggle.

== Renewed persecution after the Clementine Peace ==
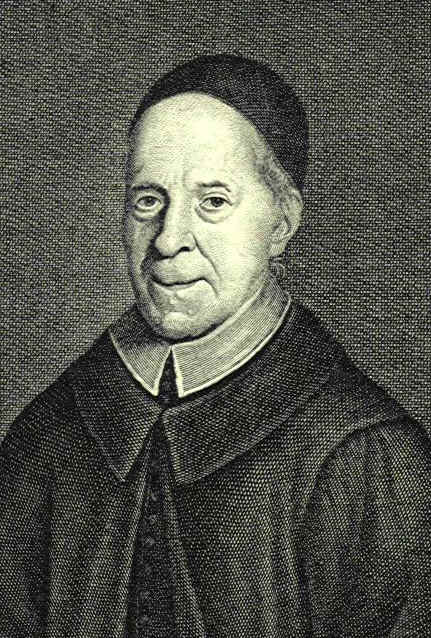
Pasquier Quesnel (1634–1719), whose book, Nouveau Testament en français avec des réflexions morales sur chaque verset, set off the last major recurrence of the Jansenist controversy in 1692 and was the subject of the 1713 apostolic constitution Unigenitus

The death of the Duchess of Longueville, protector of Port-Royal and the Jansenists, in 1679, as well as the signing of the Treaties of Nijmegen and of Saint-Germain the same year, left Louis XIV with a free hand to resume his persecution of Jansenism.

In agreement with the king, the new archbishop of Paris, François de Harlay de Champvallon, expelled the novices and confessors (seventy people) from the monastery of Port-Royal-des-Champs and banned recruitment. Following this measure, the main Jansenist theologians went into exile: Pierre Nicole settled in Spanish Flanders until 1683, Antoine Arnauld took refuge in Brussels in 1680 and was joined by Jacques Joseph Duguet in 1685, an Augustinian Oratorian.

In 1696, the work of Martin de Barcos (nephew of Jean du Vergier de Hauranne), Expression de la foi catholique touchant la grâce et la prédestination ('Expression of the Catholic faith, touching on grace and predestination'), was published by the Benedictine Gabriel Gerberon, then in exile in Holland. This work was immediately condemned by the archbishop of Paris, Louis Antoine de Noailles, although he was very deferential towards Augustine's writings. Notably, he approved Pasquier Quesnel's Réflexions morales in 1694, due its markedly Augustinian character. The Jansenists reacted strongly to the condemnation of Barcos' book, and criticised Noailles.

=== Pasquier Quesnel and his Réflexions morales: 1692–1710 ===
Quesnel was also a member of the Oratory of Jesus in Paris from 1657 until 1681, when he was expelled on account of his Jansenism. He sought the protection of Pierre du Cambout de Coislin, bishop of Orléans, who harbored Quesnel for four years, until Quesnel joined Antoine Arnauld in Brussels in 1689. In 1692, Quesnel published the Nouveau Testament en français avec des réflexions morales sur chaque verset ('New Testament in French with moral reflections on each verse'), a devotional guide to the New Testament that laid out the Jansenist position in strong terms. This work, consistently republished because of its success, was classically Augustinian. Quesnel remained measured on questions of grace, but on the other hand was fiercely Gallican in the vein of Edmond Richer. Indeed, Quesnel was seen as the functional successor of Antoine Arnauld upon his death in 1694, and therefore as the leader of the 'Jansenist party'.

The Réflexions morales did not initially arouse controversy; not only was it recommended by Noailles but it was also approved for publication by Félix Vialart de Herse, bishop of Châlons-sur-Marne. Neither Vialart nor Noailles appeared to have realized that the book had strongly Jansenist overtones, and had thought that they were simply approving a pious manual of devotion. However, in the years that followed, several bishops became aware of the book's Jansenist tendencies and issued condemnations: Joseph-Ignace de Foresta, bishop of Apt, in 1703; Charles-Béningne Hervé, bishop of Gap, in 1704; and both François-Joseph de Grammont, bishop of Besançon, and Édouard Bargedé, bishop of Nevers, in 1707. When the Inquisition drew the Réflexions morales to the attention of Clement XI, he issued the papal brief Universi dominici (1708), proscribing the book for "savouring of the Jansenist heresy". As a result, in 1710, Jean-François de l'Escure de Valderil, bishop of Luçon, and Étienne de Champflour, bishop of La Rochelle, forbade the reading of the book in their dioceses.

=== Case of Conscience: 1701–1709 ===
The tensions generated by the continuing presence of these elements in the French Roman Catholic Church came to a head in the Case of Conscience of 1701, which was initiated by a priest from Clermont-Ferrand. The case involved the question of whether or not absolution should be given to a cleric who refused to affirm the infallibility of the Church in matters de facto (even if he did not preach against it but merely maintained a 'respectful silence'). A provincial conference, consisting of forty theology professors from the Sorbonne, headed by Noël Alexandre, declared that the cleric should receive absolution.

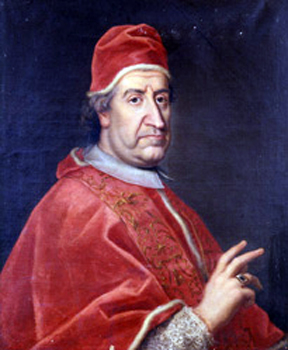
Pope Clement XI (1649–1721) promulgated the apostolic constitution Unigenitus Dei Filius in 1713, which condemned Quesnel and the Jansenists.

The publication of this 'Case of Conscience' provoked outrage among the anti-Jansenist elements in the Roman Catholic Church. The decision given by the scholars was condemned by several French bishops; by Cardinal Louis Antoine de Noailles, archbishop of Paris; by the theological faculties at Leuven, Douai and eventually Paris; and, finally, in 1703, by Pope Clement XI. The scholars who had signed the Case of Conscience then backed away, all of the signatories withdrew their signatures and the theologian who had championed the result of the Case of Conscience, Nicolas Petitpied, was expelled from the Sorbonne.

Louis XIV and his grandson, Philip V of Spain, then asked the pope to issue a papal bull condemning the practice of maintaining a 'respectful silence' as to the issue of the infallibility of the Church in matters de facto.

The pope obliged, issuing the apostolic constitution Vineam Domini Sabaoth, on 16 July 1705. At the subsequent Assembly of the French Clergy, all those present, except P.-Jean-Fr. de Percin de Montgaillard, bishop of Saint-Pons, voted to accept Vineam Domini Sabaoth and Louis XIV promulgated it as binding law in France.

=== Dissolution of Port-Royal and promulgation of Unigenitus: 1708–1713 ===
Louis XIV also sought the dissolution of Port-Royal-des-Champs, the stronghold of Jansenist thought, and this was achieved in 1708 when the pope issued a bull enacting this. The remaining nuns were forcibly removed in 1709 and dispersed among various other French convents and the buildings were razed in 1709. The convent of Port-Royal de Paris remained in existence until it was closed in the general dechristianisation of France during the French Revolution.

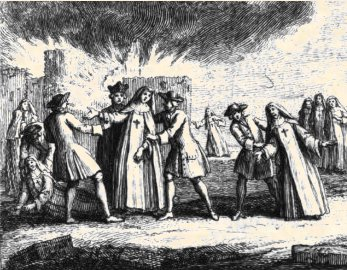
Nuns being forcibly removed from the convent of Port-Royal-des-Champs in 1709

All these condemnations allowed Louis XIV to make arguments to definitively reduce the movement to a 'republican sect', that is to say, a sect opposed to the royal absolutist regime. Taking advantage of the War of the Spanish Succession, he had Quesnel imprisoned by Humbertus Guilielmus de Precipiano, archbishop of Mechelen in the Spanish Netherlands in 1703, and had all his papers seized, although he escaped and fled to Amsterdam, where he lived for the remainder of his life. This was followed by the arrest of the entire network of correspondents woven by Quesnel over fifteen years throughout France. The centres of the secret publication of Jansenist writings were discovered, forcing Jansenists to flee abroad, most often to the Spanish Netherlands or the Dutch Republic, passing through monasteries such as the abbey of Hautefontaine, on the border between Champagne and independent Lorraine.

Louis XIV asked the pope for a final condemnation, specifically for the Réflexions morales of Quesnel. Clement XI sent a papal brief in 1708, but it was not received by the parlement of Paris. The Jesuit priest Michel Le Tellier, the king's confessor, tried to convince the bishops to ask for a formal condemnation of the work, but unsuccessfully. The king therefore asked the pope for a papal bull condemning the book. In response, Clement XI promulgated the bull Unigenitus Dei Filius on 8 September 1713. It was written with the contribution of Gregorio Selleri, a lector at the College of Saint Thomas, the future Pontifical University of Saint Thomas Aquinas, Angelicum, and later Master of the Sacred Palace, fostered the condemnation of Jansenism by condemning one hundred and one propositions from the Réflexions morales of Quesnel as heretical, and as identical with propositions already condemned in the writings of Jansen. These propositions as well as the work itself are seen as a summary of Jansenist doctrine.

== The reception of the papal bull Unigenitus ==
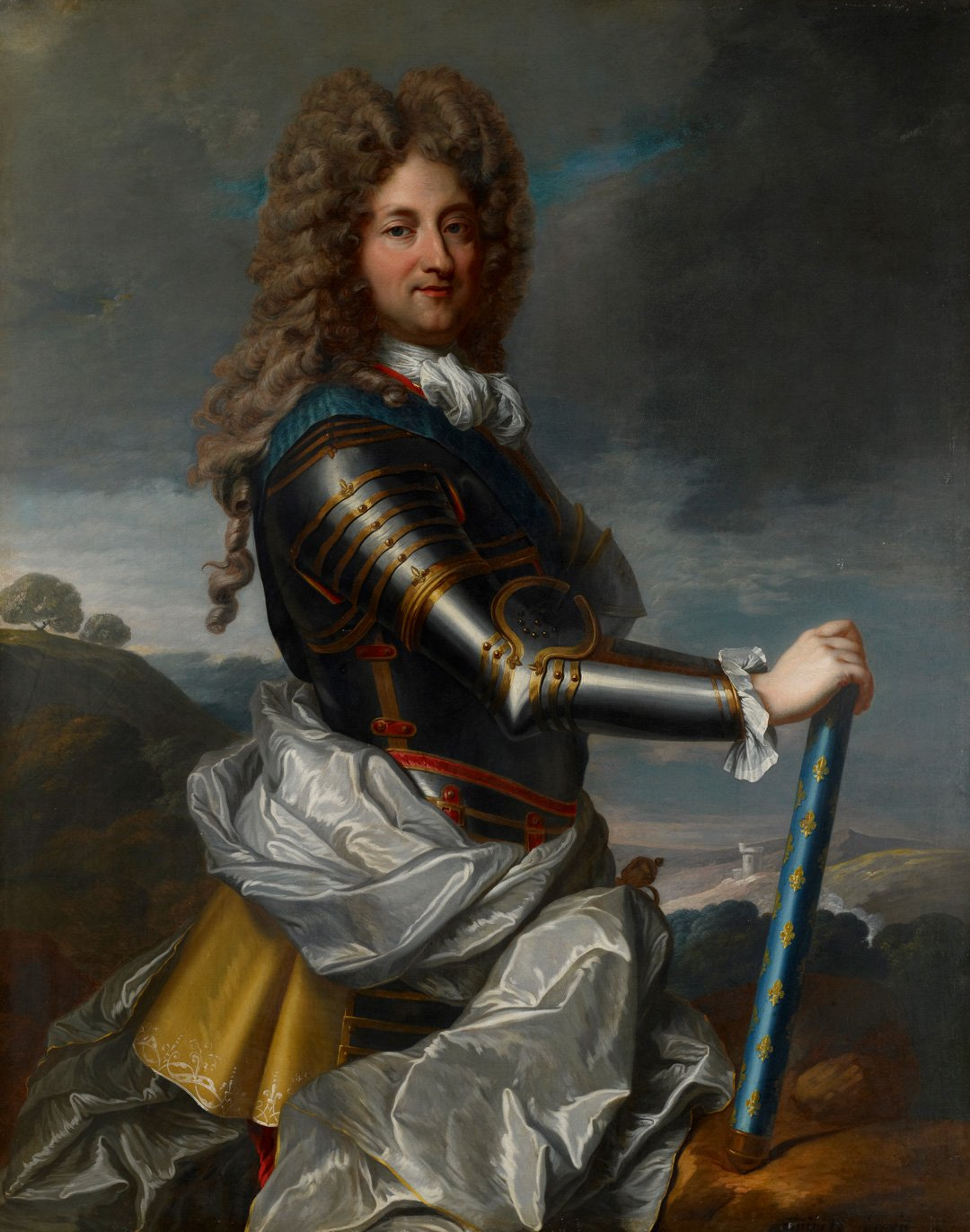
Philippe II, Duke of Orléans (1674–1723), regent of France, who attempted to maintain the policy of his predecessor Louis XIV, of appeasing both the pope and the Gallican clergy in the condemnation of Jansenism

By condemning the one hundred and one propositions taken from Quesnel's Réflexions morales, the papal bull Unigenitus marks a significant turning point in the history of Jansenism. Those Jansenists who accepted the bull became known as acceptants.

The bull saw in the propositions listed a summary of Jansenism, but, in addition to questions relating to the problem of grace, traditional positions on Gallicanism and the theology of Edmond Richer are condemned, which brought even more theologians to oppose the Jansenists, who in turn felt threatened.

The atmosphere of the final years of the reign of the aging Louis XIV was characterised by opposition to the bull. To actually be applied, the bull had to be registered with the parlement of Paris. However, the parlement refused to ratify the bull until the French bishops had taken a position on it, believing that they had no authority over religious matters deriving from their political power. Several bishops, and with them many theologians, publicly proposed the calling (appellation) of a general council to resolve the question; they were thus called the appelants. Between 1713 and 1731, more than a thousand pamphlets were published on this subject.

In the midst of this dispute, Louis XIV died in 1715, and the government of France was taken over by Philippe II, Duke of Orléans, regent for the five-year-old Louis XV. Unlike Louis XIV, who had stood solidly behind Unigenitus, Philippe II expressed ambivalence during the Régence period. With the change in political mood, three theological faculties that had previously voted to accept Unigenitus (Paris, Nantes and Reims) voted to rescind their acceptance. The Duke of Orléans was not a friend of the Jesuits; he hastened to dismiss Michel Le Tellier, the former confessor of Louis XIV, who he replaced with Abbot Claude Fleury, a Gallican suspected of Jansenism, as confessor and tutor of the young Louis. At the demand of the bishops to refuse the bull, he wrote to Clement XI to request clarifications and rectifications for Unigenitus. The pope refused, appealing to his infallibility (although papal infallibility was not a dogma until its proclamation at the First Vatican Council, it was more and more often put forward and accepted during the disputes of this era). Aspiring to continuity with the reign of Louis XIV, the Regent considered himself bound to fulfill the promise of his predecessor, which was to seek a compromise that offended neither the pope nor the Gallican clergy. Augustin Gazier describes this as a fundamentally political rather than religious settlement.

[The] Duke of Orléans, who was not a believer, subordinated religion to politics. He was imbued with the idea that royalty never dies, and that consequently kings are destined to make the same mistakes as their predecessors; they are in continuity with each other. [... Louis XIV] had promised the pope to receive the bull Unigenitus, and the pope insisted that the promise be strictly kept; Philippe d'Orléans therefore saw the need to satisfy Clement XI and consequently to bring the recalcitrant prelates to a compromise, if it were not absolutely impossible.

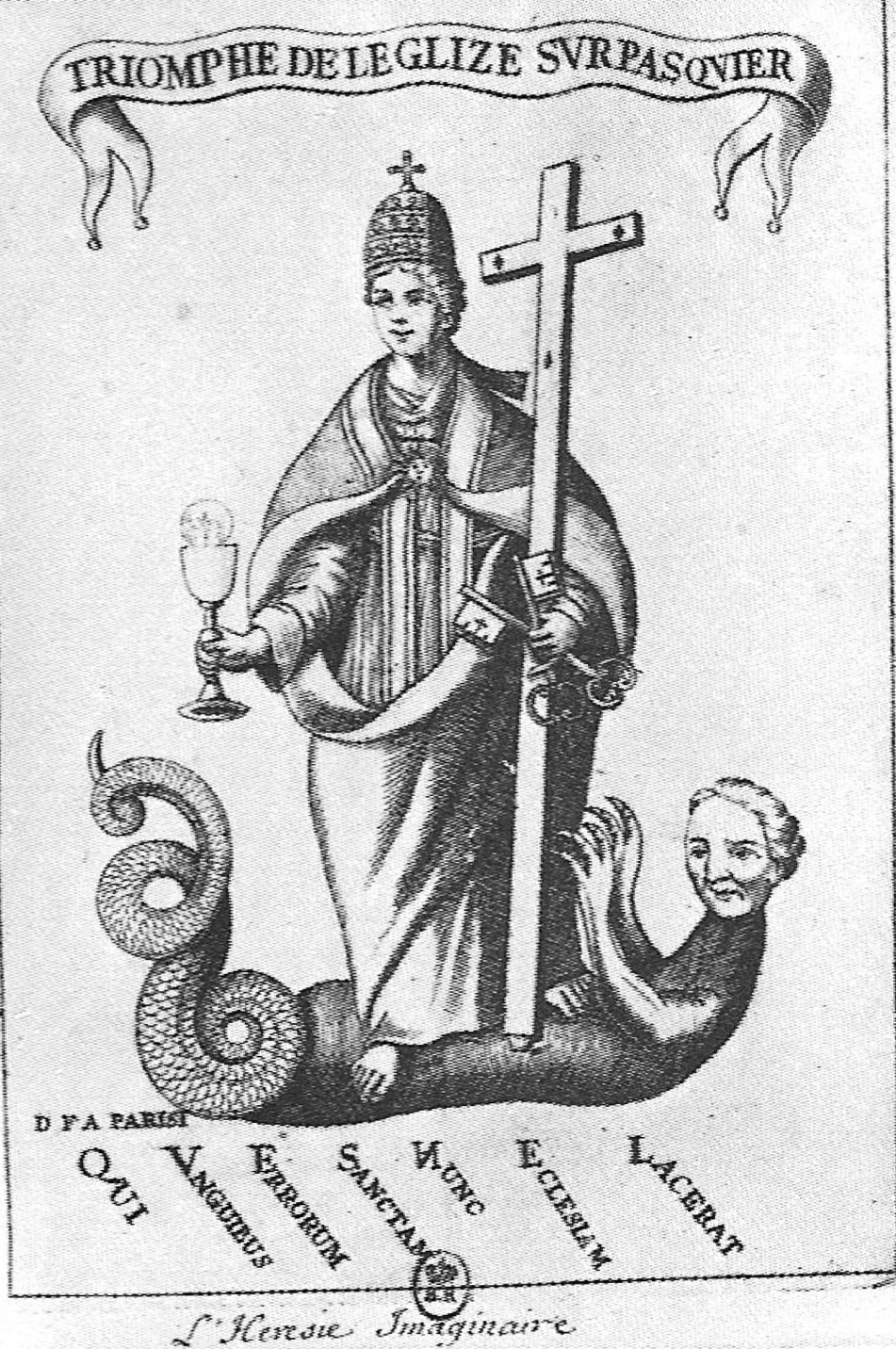
Anonymous 18th-century engraving depicting Pasquier Quesnel as a monstrous beast, who is trampled upon by a personification of the Roman Catholic Church. The text reads, "Triumph of the Church over Pasquier [...] Who is the Claw of Errors, Now Tearing at the Holy Church." (This phrase is an acrostic of the name 'Quesnel' in Latin).

However the discussions between the different parties were a failure, and in 1717, opposition to the bull became more direct. In March, four bishops filed a notarial deed at the Sorbonne, demanding a general council to appeal Unigenitus. They were joined by hundreds of French priests, monks and nuns and were supported by the parlements. For this they relied on the Declaration of the Clergy of France of 1682, which was approved by the Assembly of the French clergy and by Louis XIV. This important expression of Gallicanism placed the authority of a general council over the pope. The four bishops were Jean Soanen, bishop of Senez, Charles Joachim Colbert, bishop of Montpellier, Pierre de La Broue, bishop of Mirepoix and Pierre de Langle, bishop of Boulogne. The Inquisition condemned this appeal in 1718 and the pope excommunicated the bishops and the appelants through the letters Pastoralis officii. Far from disarming the French clergy, many of whom were then advocating conciliarism, the clergy who had appealed Unigenitus to a general council, then appealed Pastoralis officii to a general council as well. They renewed their appeal in 1719, accompanied by the archbishop of Paris Louis Antoine de Noailles, then again in 1720. After examining propositions condemned by Unigenitus, Noailles determined that as set out in the bull and apart from their context in the Réflexions morales, some of the propositions condemned by the pope were in fact orthodox. He therefore refused to accept the bull and joined the party of the appelants. In total, one cardinal, 18 bishops, and 3,000 clergy of France supported an appeal to a general council. However, the majority of clergy in France (four cardinals, 100 bishops, 100,000 clergymen) stood by the pope.

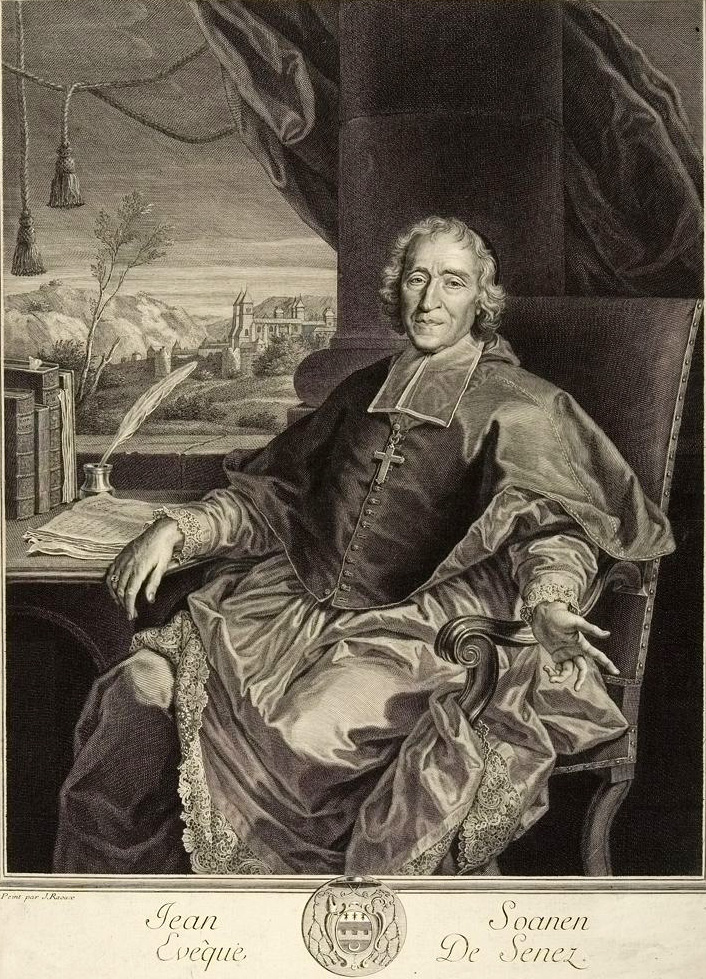
Jean Soanen (1647–1740), bishop of Senez and de facto leader of the Jansenist movement after the death of Pasquier Quesnel. In 1727 he was exiled and imprisoned by the future Cardinal de Tencin for his refusal to assent to Unigenitus.

The Regent decided to put an end to this dispute. In 1722, he reinstated the obligation to sign the Formula of Submission for the Jansenists in order to obtain benefits or university degrees. This policy was maintained until the end of the regency and many appelants received lettres de cachet ('letters of the signet') which announced their arrest without trial on the king's authority, from 1724 to 1725. In 1727, Jean Soanen, who had been the de facto leader of Jansenism since the death of Quesnel, was condemned by the Synod of Embrun led by the future Cardinal de Tencin. He was exiled to La Chaise-Dieu by a lettre de cachet, where he died in 1740. In 1728, Noailles finally submitted to the Pope and assented to Unigenitus.

The conviction of Soanen, which the Jansenists described in their writings as the 'brigandage of Embrun', caused discontent among the appelants, but Noailles' successor in Paris wanted to silence the resistance. The new archbishop Charles-Gaspard-Guillaume de Vintimille du Luc banished nearly three hundred Jansenist priests from his diocese, and closed the main sanctuaries of the movement, the Saint-Magloire seminary, the College of Sainte Barbe and the House of Sainte-Agathe, all three in Paris. In 1730, the bull became state law. Clergy who had not signed the formula could no longer retain their ecclesiastical offices, which were considered vacant.

The appelants consisted of, between 1717 and 1728, more than seven thousand clerics and around thirty prelates (with one hundred thousand members of the laity under their authority). Not all were Jansenists, but the Gallican fringe of the clergy was still shaken by the intransigence of Clement XI. The territorial distribution of the Jansenists and Gallicans in France at the beginning of the 18th century is known. At its peak in 1718, the convocation movement affected forty-five dioceses, but it was mainly the dioceses of Paris, Châlons, Tours, Senez and Auxerre that were prominent as well as the archdiocese of Lyon.

== The popularisation of Jansenism ==
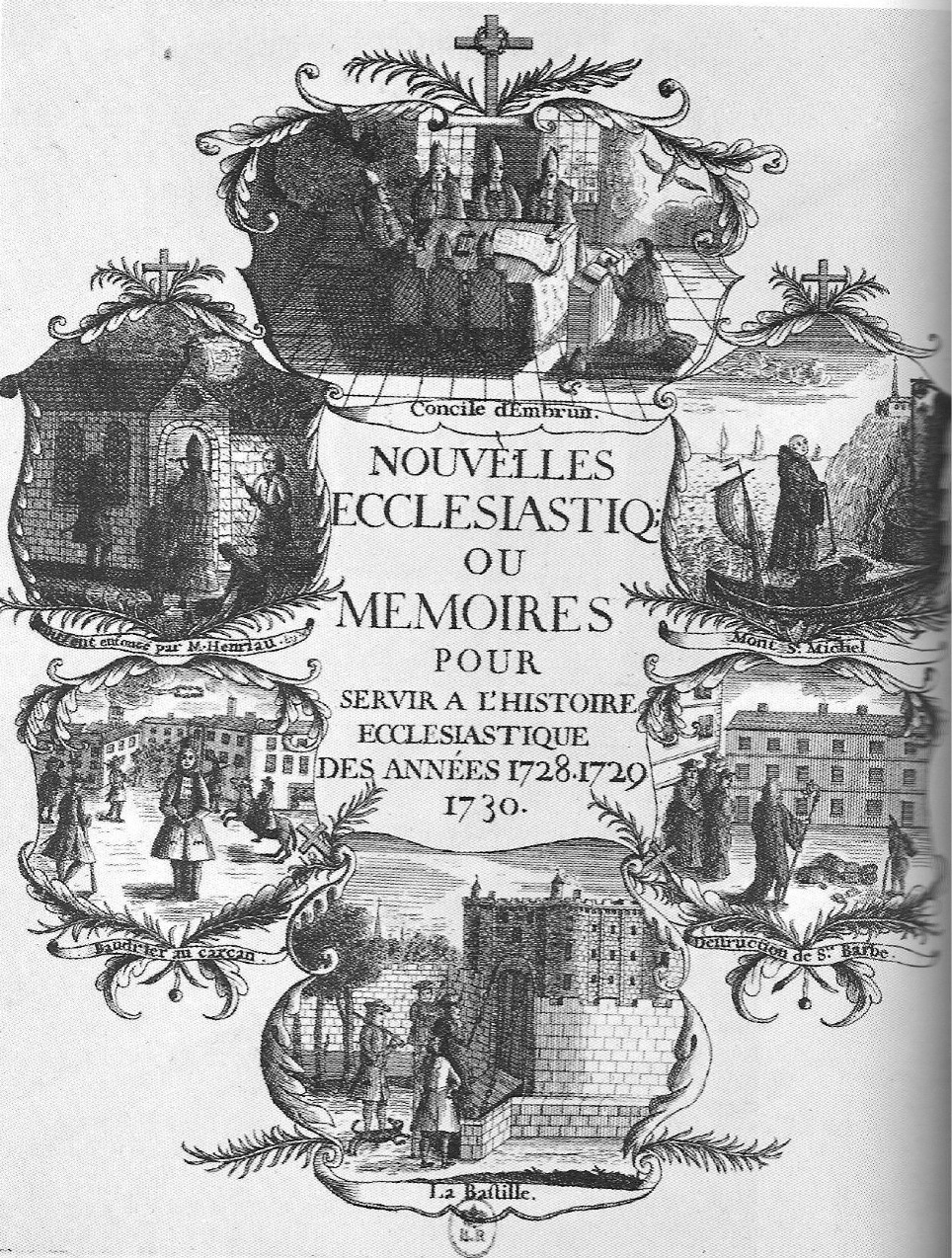
Frontispiece of the Nouvelles ecclésiastiques, an important and enduring underground newspaper of the Jansenist movement

Jansenists, from the 17th century onwards, tended to rely on miracle stories to justify their cause. One of the first and most notable was the healing of Marguerite Périer in 1656 by the relic of Sainte-Épine, which occurred when Jansenism was beginning to be seriously attacked, and was followed in that century by numerous reports of other miracles. Certain Jansenists thus gained a reputation as thaumaturges and their relics were in high demand. For example, the abbot of Pontchâteau, Solitaire and 'gardener' of Port-Royal, had his coffin forced open in 1690 after a little girl was healed during his funeral. Increasingly, Jansenism was becoming a public affair involving the miraculous. The democratisation of the conflict among parish priests caused by the bull Unigenitus and monarchical oppression only strengthened this trend. There were several miracles linked directly or indirectly to Jansenism between 1710 and 1730. They were not directly instigated by the appelant priests, but very often took place in their parishes, such as a miracle of 1725, in which Madame Lafosse, the wife of a cabinetmaker, was healed during a Eucharistic procession in the parish of Sainte-Marguerite in Paris, in which the parish priest (and bearer of the monstrance) was a notorious appelant. The miracle was recognised, processions were made and the stories were popularised by brochures and engravings.

The struggle of the appelants was supported by numerous brochures explaining the points of dispute plainly and for a general reading public. The faithful were invited to form their own opinion of the controversy, by the exhortation of priests such as the Oratorian Vivien de La Borde. The press, whether public or underground, also involved itself in religious matters. The Jansenists began a public debate with the pamphlet Supplément à la Gazette d'Hollande ('Supplement to the Gazette of Holland'). The Jansenists responded with Nouvelles ecclésiastiques ou Mémoires pour servir à l'histoire de la constitution «Unigenitus» ('Ecclesiastical news or Memoirs to serve as a basis for a history of the constitution "Unigenitus"').

This weekly paper was already circulating in handwritten form, but it was printed secretively from 1728. With a circulation of six thousand copies a week, it reached a very wide audience, in all social classes. The Nouvelles écclesiastiques served to popularise the debate and to establish links between different Jansenist groups. The Jansenists also published anti-Jesuit propaganda and played a central role in plotting and promoting the expulsion of the Jesuits from France in 1762–64. The paper ceased to exist in 1803.

The Jansenist clergy developed a unique interpretation of the time of persecution they were experiencing; a hermeneutic of the Bible known as figurism, which almost certainly originates from the teaching of the Oratorian Jacques Joseph Duguet in around 1710. For Duguet, just as the Old Testament prefigured the coming of Christ, so the stories and prophecies of the Scriptures, especially the Book of Revelation, prefigure (or are figures of) current or future events. Thus the bull Unigenitus, considered an error of the pope and the Church, was the beginning of great upheavals that would announce the return of the Prophet Elijah. Following his return, Christ will reign for a thousand years with the elect and the 'Friends of the Truth' who believe in efficacious grace, also converting the Jews. This vision of time and events, mainly taught at the seminary of Saint-Magloire in Paris by Abbot d'Étemare, spread among the clergy and the public. For the Jansenists, it was a way of interpreting their persecution and status as a dwindling minority. They saw themselves as defending the cause of divine truth alone, against a church and secular authority who betrayed it.

The popularisation of Jansenism can also be attributed to their pastoral theology which led to popular education and assistance.

=== The phenomenon of the Convulsionnaires of Saint-Médard ===
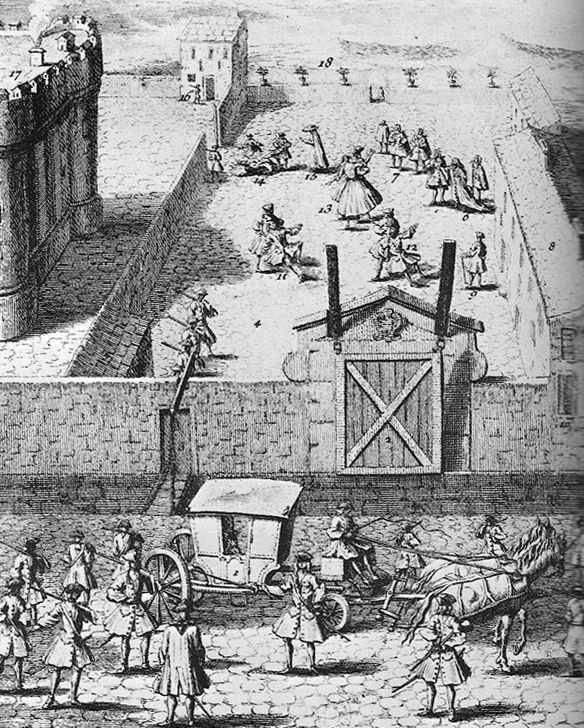
Anonymous 18th-century engraving of Convulsionnaires imprisoned in the Bastille. This unusual expression of Jansenism also became associated with political resistance, at least in the eyes of the royal absolutist authority of 18th-century France.

From 1731, the dramatic popularisation of Jansenism gave rise to the phenomenon of the convulsionnaires. Initially a series of miracles linked to the tomb of the Jansenist deacon François de Pâris in the Saint-Médard Cemetery in Paris, including religious ecstasy, the phenomenon transformed into an expression of opposition to papal and royal authority. The convulsions spread among the Parisian people including the bourgeoisie during the 1730s. The connection between the larger French Jansenist movement and the smaller, more radical convulsionnaire phenomenon is difficult to state with precision. Brian Strayer noted, in Suffering Saints, almost all convulsionnaires were Jansenists, but very few Jansenists embraced the convulsionnaire phenomenon. Nevertheless, the phenomenon persisted until the 19th century.

"The format of their seances changed perceptibly after 1732," according to Strayer. "Instead of emphasizing prayer, singing, and healing miracles, believers now participated in 'spiritual marriages' (which occasionally bore earthly children), encouraged violent convulsions [...] and indulged in the secours (erotic and violent forms of torture), all of which reveals how neurotic the movement was becoming." The movement descended into brutal cruelties that "clearly had sexual overtones" in their practices of penance and mortification of the flesh. In 1735, the parlements regained jurisdiction over the convulsionnaires, which changed into an underground movement of clandestine sects. The next year "an alleged plot" by convulsionnaire revolutionaries to overthrow the parlements and assassinate Louis XV was thwarted. The "Augustinian convulsionnaires" were then absconded from Paris to avoid police surveillance. This "further split the Jansenist movement."

According to Strayer, by 1741 the leadership was "dead, exiled, or imprisoned," and the movement was divided. The police's role increased and the parlements' role decreased "in the social control of Jansenism" but cells continued engaging in seances, torture, and apocalyptic and treasonous rhetoric. Strayer related a case of torture documented in 1757 where a woman was "beat [...] with garden spades, iron chains, hammers, and brooms [...] jabbed [...] with swords, pelted [...] with stones, buried [...] alive, [...] crucified." In another case documented in 1757, a woman "was cut with a knife numerous times" causing gangrene. By 1755 there were fewer than eight hundred convulsionnaires in France. In 1762 the parlements criminalized some of their practices "as 'potentially dangerous' to human life." The last crucifixion was documented in 1788.

== Jansenism in the parlements ==
=== The conjunction of Jansenism and parlementarism ===
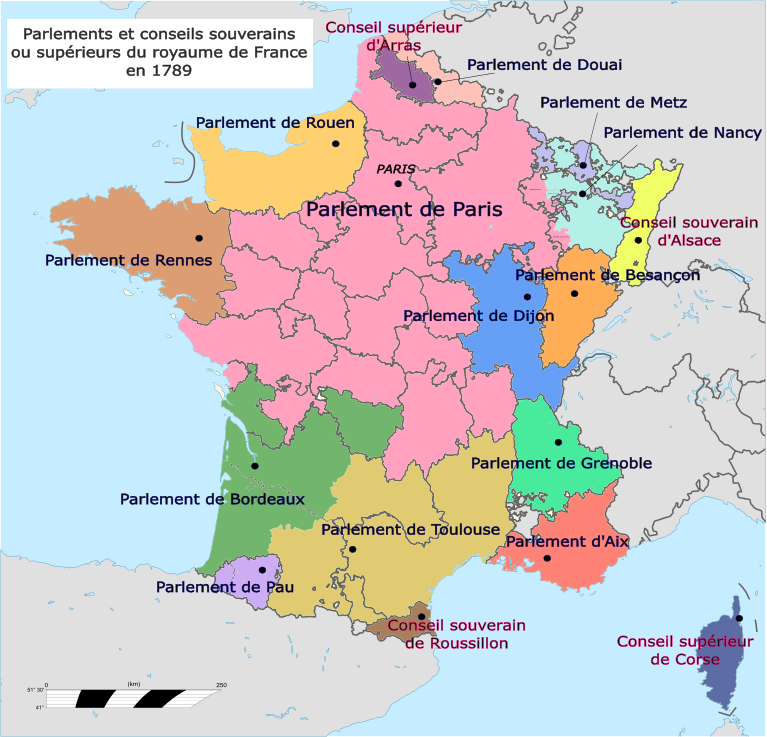
'Parliaments and Sovereign or Superior Councils of the Kingdom of France in 1789'

The parlements of the Ancien Régime, and in particular the parlement of Paris, had long been defenders of Gallicanism against Rome. From the beginning of the Jansenist controversy, the parlements tended to sympathise with Jansenists, reluctant to register the papal bulls condemning the movement.

This happened upon the promulgation of the bull Unigenitus. The Attorney General, Henri François d'Aguesseau, considered the promulgation of the bull to be proof of the fallibility of the Pope. He encouraged parlementarians not to accept the bull and to wait for a reaction from the bishops. It was necessary for Louis XIV to use letters patent to force registration of the bull. Despite this, the letters Pastoralis officii were not received in 1718, which alleviated the fears of the appelants in the short term.In fact, a lit de justice was required for the bull to be registered as state law in 1730, so great was the resistance by the parlements.

René Taveneaux, in his Jansenism and Politics, underlines the importance of Jansenist recruitment among the parlementarians of the 18th century. According to him, Jansenism had a "bourgeois base", which dated back to the 17th century, with the Arnauld, Lemaistre, Pascal and other families who were considered Nobles of the Robe. Marie-José Michel also underlines the attraction of entire elite families to Port-Royal and Jansenism from the beginning of the movement, and writes of a "proliferating Jansenisation of elites".

Lucien Goldmann's thesis is that this was an expression of a class spirit that had taken root during the Fronde, along with a discontent regarding the centralising absolutist monarchy. Faced with the growing power of the royal commissioners, to the detriment of the officials (of bourgeois recruitment), the latter practiced an increasingly anti-establishment "critical retreat from the world". Taveneaux moderates this interpretation with a Marxist analysis of a "meeting ground" between Jansenism and the bourgeoisie, arguing that the bourgeois noble was free under the Ancien Régime, detached from the seigneurial hierarchy, and that this individualistic situation, was, by some, easily associated with Jansenist morality, which preferred the development of the interior life in contrast to the splendour of Tridentine liturgy, and a demanding moral rigorism rather than the easily accessible sacraments characteristic of Jesuit theology. The essentially urban basis of Jansenism also allowed this 'meeting ground' between it and the parliamentary bourgeoisie.

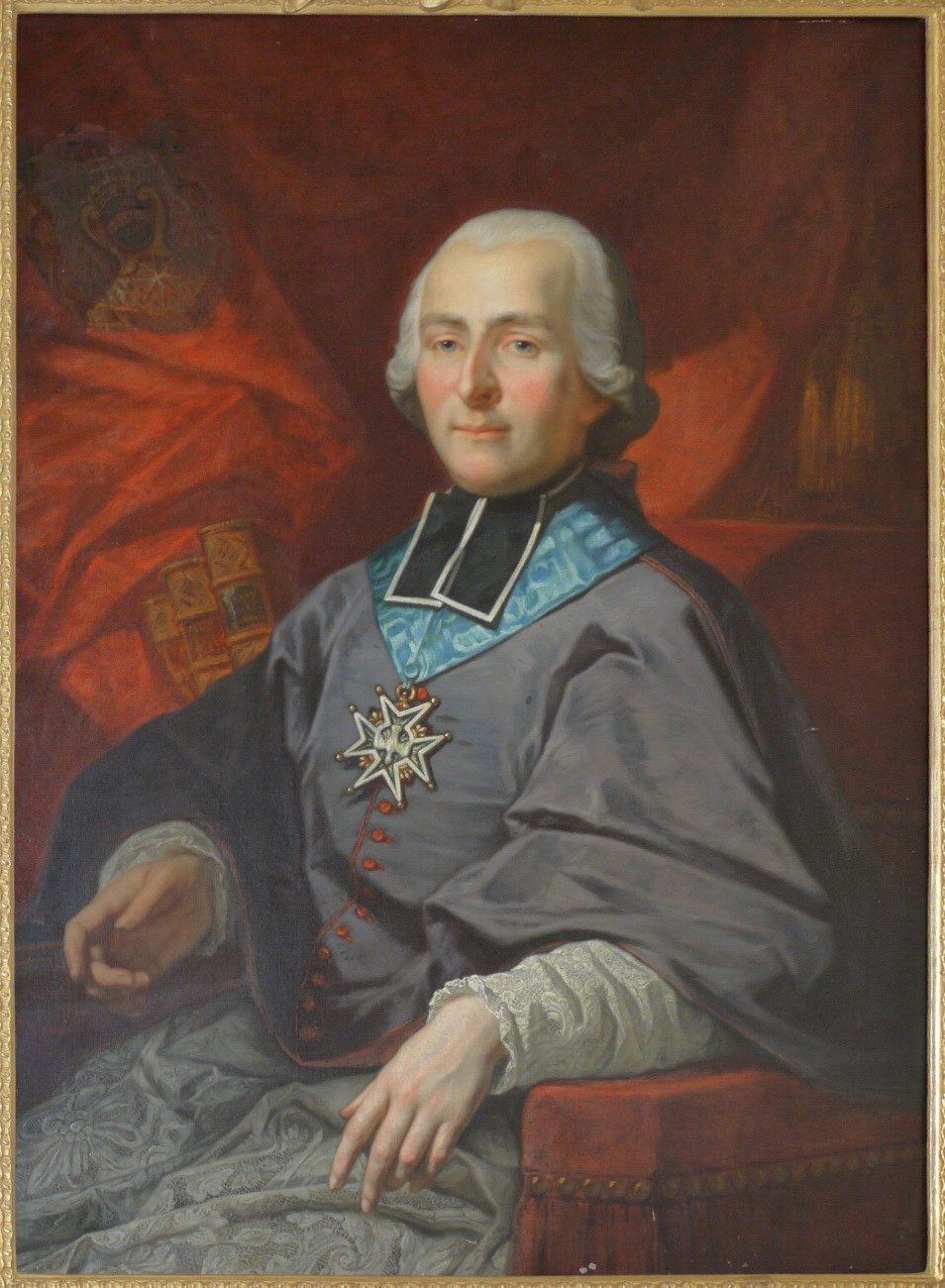
Christophe de Beaumont (1703–1781), archbishop of Paris, who instituted the 'confession notes' in order to rid the French Roman Catholic Church of Jansenist elements

=== The Jansenist cause and the revolt of the parlements ===
The parlements, especially that of Paris, were in constant rebellion against monarchical power during the 18th century. Jansenists and appelants therefore found the parliamentarians to be a close ally. Moreover, the weapon of the Jansenists to resist both the king and the pope was legal; the 'appeal as from an abuse', in order to protest an injustice and deny the pope's or a bishop's right to exercise their authority on a specific point. The appelants brought their demands before the parlement, an organ of justice in which the Jansenist magistrates would employ their rhetoric and legal arsenal to combine the Jansenist cause with a defence of the independence of the parlements, thus winning the support of parliamentarians who were Gallicans or resistant to royal power. However, "most often, Jansenist magistrates carefully avoided any reference to religious convictions, aware that a theological discourse would have been inadmissible in an assembly of judges." Jansenism was therefore readily confused with the incessant parliamentary struggles of the 18th century, while its theological nature faded. Numerically speaking, the presence of Jansenists was modest. For Paris, about a quarter of magistrates in the 1730s were Jansenists, including a group of lawyers influential enough to initiate two general strikes of their order in 1732 with the aim of bolstering the independence of the parlement.

One of these influential lawyers was Louis Adrien Le Paige. Bailiff of the Tour du Temple, which bore the right of asylum and was therefore one of the most important hubs of the Jansenist network, taking advantage of the right to harbour numerous banned publications. The Temple also housed the famous 'Perrette box', which contained the Jansenists' financing fund; an object of curiosity and fantasy among anti-Jansenists. Another of these lawyers was Gabriel-Nicolas Maultrot, nicknamed the 'second-class lawyer' because of the many appelant priests he defended.

The most significant conflict involving the parliamentarians and Jansenism was the affair of the 'confession notes'. In 1746, the archbishop of Paris Christophe de Beaumont proposed that the faithful must be able to provide a proof of a 'confession note' signed by a priest who approved Unigenitus in order to receive extreme unction. The measure encountered major opposition, and many legal appeals were filed which were quashed by the king's council. In 1749, a large demonstration occurred after the burial of a Jansenist college principal who died without being granted confession. Among the four thousand people who comprised the procession, there were many parliamentarians.

An important religious event of the second half of the 18th century was the expulsion of the Jesuits in 1764, which united Jansenism and the monarchy for a time. However, Jansenism joined the side of the magistrates in their revolt against the policies of Chancellor de Maupeou and his Triumvirate to destroy the parliamentary system. The most radical members of the revolt joined what was called the 'patriot party', the spearhead of pre-Revolutionary protest. The synthesis of their struggles and demands with the theses of Jean-Jacques Rousseau was to give substance to the ideological beginnings of the French Revolution.

== Jansenism and the French Revolution ==
=== The role of the Jansenists in the Civil Constitution of the Clergy ===
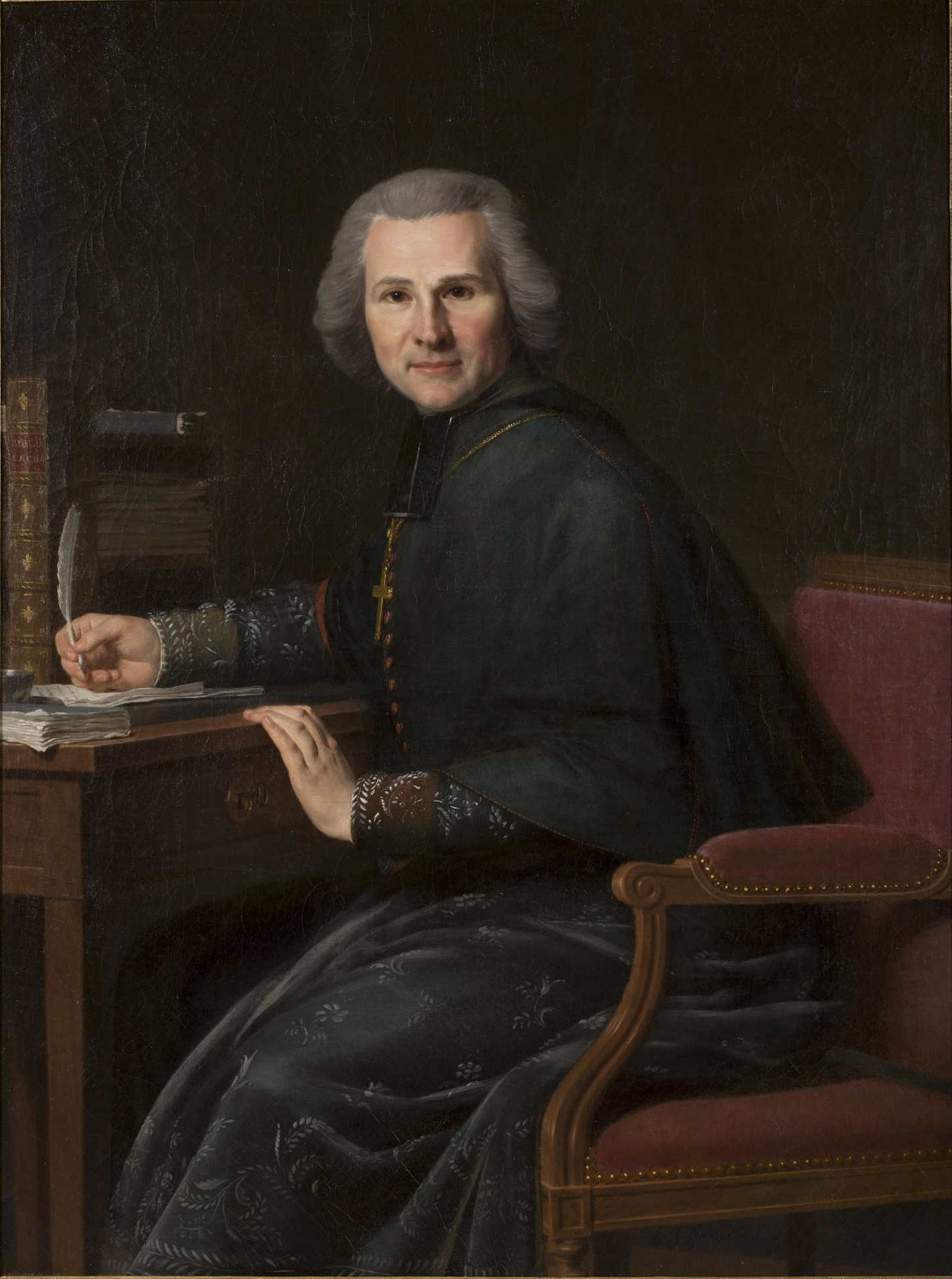
Abbé Grégoire—Henri Grégoire (1750–1831), Jansenist priest and revolutionary leader

Among the early defenders of the French Revolution were personalities known for their Gallicanism, sympathy for Jansenism and more or less marked adherence to the theology of Edmond Richer. The role of the Jansenists in the Revolution was essentially a product of the ecclesiological character of late Jansenism, which was tinged with Gallicanism.

The role of Jansenising priests was noted from the beginning of the Revolution. Indeed, without the addition of a few priests to the Third Estate during the assembly of the Estates General of 1789, it would not have been able to declare itself a National Assembly on 17 June 1789. These priests were led by Abbot Henri Grégoire, whose attachment to Port-Royal and Jansenism was known. Grégoire shared with the Jansenists a figurist vision of history, which underlay his statement that the Revolution was part of the fulfilment of God's will. Around Grégoire and the priests favourable to the Revolution mainly Gallicans and other Jansenists from the parlements gathered together. Louis Adrien Le Paige was generally favourable to the Revolution. Likewise, Armand-Gaston Camus and Jean-Denis Lanjuinais, renowned parliamentarians, were heavily involved in Revolutionary events while remanining attached to the Jansenist cause. Lanjuinais was notably a member of the ecclesiastical committee which prepared the Civil Constitution of the Clergy. The importance of Jansenists in the drafting of this constitution, so favourable to their demands on many points, meant that the Abbot Emmanuel Joseph Sieyès attacked those who "seem to have seen in the Revolution merely a superb opportunity to lift up the theological importance of Port-Royal and to establish the apotheosis of Jansenius over the tomb of his enemies". The Civil Constitution of the Clergy satisfied the Jansenists on many points; it put an end to practices that were widely criticised, for example the residence of bishops outside of their dioceses or non-canonical benefices. The Constitution reinstated diocesan synods, considerably reduced the influence of the pope and reproved formulas such as that of Alexander VII. Furthermore, it satisfied the wealthy fringe of the clergy by establishing election within the Gallican Church and by promoting cooperation between parish priests and prelates, rather than a relationship of subordination.

For these Jansenists, the Civil Constitution of the Clergy and all the ecclesiastical constitution that resulted from it were nothing other than the culmination of all the religious and parliamentary struggles of the 18th century. Dale K. Van Kley lists five points which brought together the interests of Gallican Jansenists and those of France in the early Revolution, and which Camus in particular developed.

- The administration of ecclesiastical property fell to the hierarchy, but its ownership fell to the Church in France as a whole. By property and goods, not only material goods are meant but also 'spiritual keys', that is, the sacraments and anathemas.
- The Church was not only made up of its clerical hierarchy, but of all the Roman Catholic faithful. As France almost entirely consisted of Roman Catholics, it can be said that the National Assembly, which brought together all French people, was a representation of the Church. It could therefore declare that the property of the Church was the property of the nation, and so sell it to repay the national debt or pay priests and bishops.
- There was no usurpation of the Church, since the state only acted on the public, external and temporal aspects of the Church's mission, leaving the spiritual aspect untouched. Even when the National Assembly suppressed monastic orders, redrew the ecclesiastical map or abrogated the 1515 Concordat of Bologna, it denied that it affected the spiritual mission of the Church.
- The suppression of ecclesiastical governance were justified on the grounds that the sacrament of ordination is purely spiritual, and gives to the one who receives it the unlimited and illimitable power to preach and administer the sacraments. On the other hand, the actual exercise of this power was the responsibility of the Assembly since it was temporal. A priest who did not submit to the Assembly could therefore be denied a parish, for example.
- Camus further justified the constitution by claiming that the Early Church was a model of spiritual authority detached from the temporal, and therefore that the Constitutional Church was only returning to this state of purity. The Church could therefore free itself from the approval of the pope, who was not considered superior to other bishops.

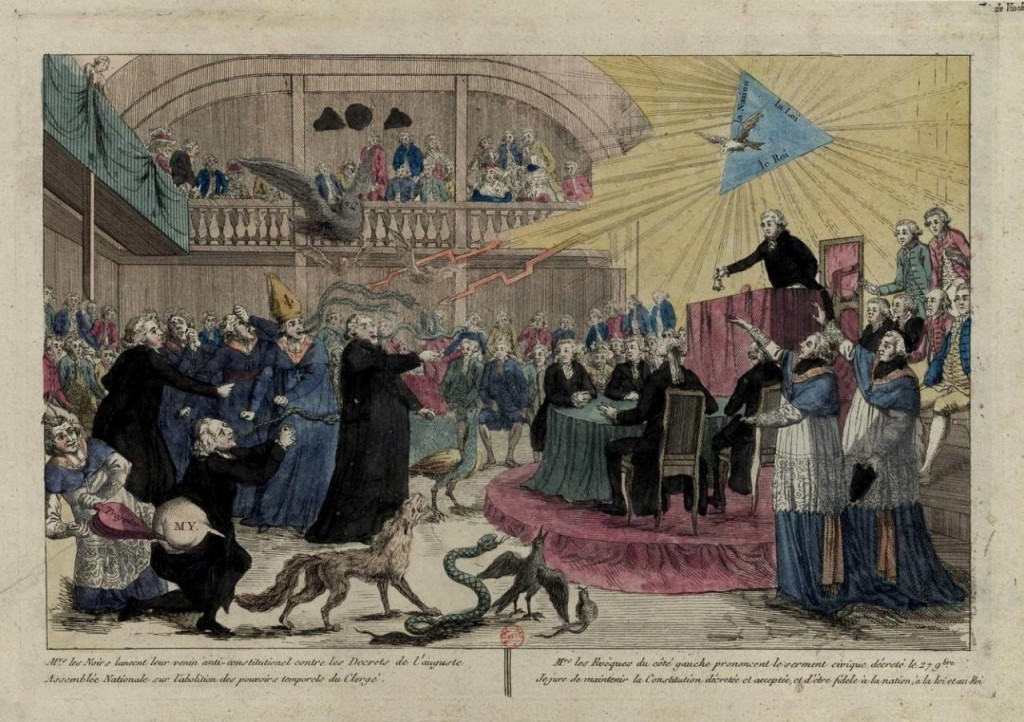
The National Constituent Assembly votes on the Civil Constitution of the Clergy (1790). Opposing clergy are depicted as speaking anti-constitutional venom, whereas supporting clergy are swearing the oath of loyalty to the Constitution, France, the law and the king.

The Jansenist and Gallican influence in the Civil Constitution of the Clergy explains why so many of the new constitutional bishops were classified as Jansenists or at least as Jansenist sympathisers. Thus, in addition to Abbé Grégoire, bishop of Blois and de facto head of the Constitutional Church, were Claude Debertier, Jean-Baptiste Pierre Saurine, Louis Charrier de La Roche and about fifteen others who, without necessarily being appelants, nevertheless identified themselves strongly with Jansenism and Richer.

Laypeople and clerics joined the Société de philosophie chrétienne ('Society of Christian philosophy'), which pursued religious studies during the Revolution in a strongly Jansenist spirit. In the final years of the Revolution, the Society published the Annales de la religion ('Annals of religion'), a Gallican and Jansenist journal, which published the first version of Abbé Grégoire's Ruines de Port-Royal des Champs en 1801 ('Ruins of Port-Royal-des-Champs in 1801'). Members of the Society frequently took residences for reflection at Port-Royal-des-Champs, and were in close contact with the Italian Jansenists Eustache Degola and Scipione de' Ricci.

There were, however, a significant number of Jansenists who completely rejected the Revolution. As for clergymen, the best known were Henri Jabineau and Dom Deforis. But others, like Abbots Mey, Dalléas and the Oratorian clergy of Lyon, were also very much in opposition to the Civil Constitution of the Clergy. They were supported by canonists like Gabriel-Nicolas Maultrot, and by pious laypeople such as Nicolas Bergasse in Lyon or Louis Silvy in Paris. Some, like Augustin-Jean-Charles Clément, a notable Jansenist, swore the oath of loyalty to the Constitution, but only with great hesitation.

=== Analysis of the Jansenist involvement in the Revolution ===
Let the Constituent Assembly, once it has emerged from the stormy discussions that mark its beginning and the votes of its major state laws, address the civil constitution of the clergy; Jansenist inspiration will preside over the organisation of the new Church. Camus will triumph over Louis XIV; the ecclesiastical committee will avenge the ashes of Port-Royal, and the Jansenist legislators who spoke so much about returning to the organisation of the Early Church will in fact return it to martyrdom. (Abbé Sicard, The Old Clergy of France, 1893)

Jansenism is often cited, if not as one of the causes of the Revolution, at least as having shaped the state of mind necessary for its outbreak. This accusation was first made by counter-revolutionaries, who saw the Jansenists as allies of Protestants and Freemasons; others supposedly responsible for the fall of the French monarchy. Even if the reasons for this accusation are erroneous, there was a strong link between Jansenism and the Revolution.

For the counter-revolutionaries and ultramontanists of the 19th century, Jansenism was accused of having prepared and accompanied the Revolution for the following reasons.

- Jansenism maintained a seditious spirit. Its revolts and resistance against popes and kings were a negative influence for the people, who could reproduce in politics the religious attitude of Jansenists.
- Jansenism discouraged the faithful. They preferred to distance themselves from religion rather than satisfy the demands of Jansenist priests. This accusation is based on the correlation between the geographical distribution of the appelants and constitutional priests during the Revolution and the zones of dechristianisation. However this correlation is difficult to interpret.
- Through its association with Gallicanism, Jansenism was a source of schism in France under the Revolution, between the constitutional clergy, favourable to a national church, and the 'refractory clergy' who followed the condemnation of the Civil Constitution of the Clergy by Pope Pius VI.
- Finally, Jansenism was often associated with republicanism, because it dissociated itself from court life, with the Solitaires giving an image of a 'Republic of Letters', and because leading figures during the Revolution, such as Abbé Grégoire, did not hide their attachment to Port-Royal.

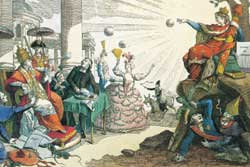
Anonymous 18th-century satirical engraving of papal bulls being returned to the pope by France, strengthened by the Declaration of the Rights of Man and of the Citizen (1789). The historical Jansenist opposition to papal bulls coincided with Revolutionary anti-clericalism.

Among 19th-century republicans, who were quite favourable to Port-Royal and Jansenism as movements which fought against absolute monarchy and royal authority, there were also defenders of the theory according to which the Jansenists were largely responsible for the outbreak of the Revolution. Thus Jules Michelet, Louis Blanc, Henri Martin and Charles-Louis Chassin argued for a partly Jansenist origin of the Revolution.

If it is possible to associate Jansenism and the Revolution outside the religious domain, it is because there was a tradition of protest among Jansenists and because socially, those who drove the Revolution (bourgeoisie of the legal and parliamentary worlds) were the same as those who embraced the appelant cause in the 18th century.

Some (mainly among the Jesuits) were convinced of the existence of a Jansenist plot aimed at overthrowing monarchical power. At the beginning of the 20th century, historians such as Louis Madelin and Albert Mathiez refuted this Jansenist conspiracy thesis and emphasised a conjunction of forces and demands as responsible for both the outbreak of the Revolution and the Civil Constitution of the Clergy. The theory that the explanation of the Revolution must appeal to several causes, of which Jansenism is only one among others, is now the consensus among historians.

== Jansenism outside France ==
The problem of grace concerned all Roman Catholic countries in the 17th century, and Jansenism, born outside of the Kingdom of France, did not remain confined to France. However, during the early period of Jansenism, that is the 17th century, most of the history of Jansenism took place within the kingdom. It was with the bull Unigenitus that Jansenism truly expanded outside of France.

=== The Spanish Netherlands—Leuven ===
As noted by Jonathan Israel Jansenism initially had strong support in the Spanish Netherlands, where Jansen himself had been active, supported by such major figures of the church hierarchy as Jacobus Boon, archbishop of Mechelen and Antonie Triest, bishop of Ghent. Though the Church in the Spanish Netherlands eventually took up the persecution of Jansenism, with Jansenist clergy being replaced by their opponents and the monument to Jansen in the Cathedral of Ypres being symbolically demolished in 1656. Nevertheless the Spanish authorities were less zealous in this persecution than the French.

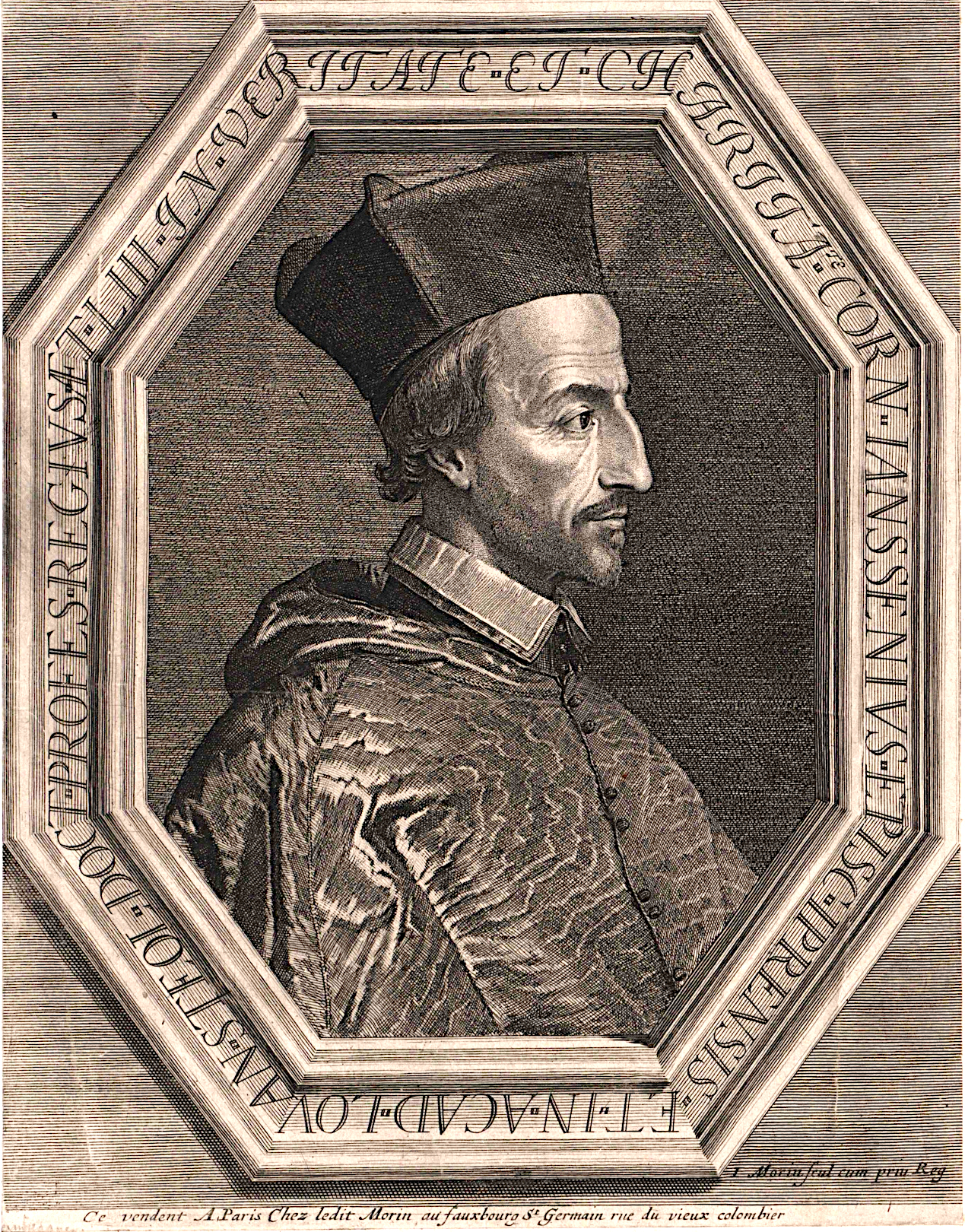
Portrait of Cornelius Jansen (1585–1638). Jansen's alma mater, the (Old) University of Leuven, became a major centre of Jansenist theology.

The (Old) University of Leuven, which published Augustinus, remained Augustinian in orientation since the time of Jansen. The popes were less demanding to the university, undoubtedly because they did not have a close political relationship with it as they did with Louis XIV in France. In 1677, a Baianist faction from the theological faculty submitted 116 propositions of moral laxity for censure to Pope Innocent XI. They were textually drawn from the letter of accusation of the professors of Leuven, and thus the Roman authorities suppressed dissertations dealing with the question of the true origin of the propositions, which was regarded as ambiguous. Innocent XI selected 65 propositions from the submission and "limited himself to condemning the deviations of moral doctrine", avoiding a revival of the controversy on grace. The 65 propositions were described as "at the very least scandalous and pernicious in practice", leading the Pope to censure them through a decree of the Inquisition in March 1679, yet "without naming the probabilism prevalent in Jesuit circles." The Inquistition previously censured 45 propositions of moral doctrine between two decrees dated to 24 September 1665, and 18 March 1666. According to Denzinger, the propositions submitted, by both the University of Leuven and the University of Paris, were "frequently taken out of context and sometimes expanded by elements that are not found in the original, so that most often one must speak of fictitious authors."

Until the 1690s, it was possible to sign Formula of Pope Alexander VII without specifying one's interpretation of it regarding matters de jure and de facto. Twice the archbishop of Mechelen, Humbertus Guilielmus de Precipiano, tried to toughen the signing conditions, but he lost a lawsuit against the university. It was not until 1710 that the absolute and unqualified signing of the Formula was made compulsory.

Unigenitus was accepted without question from 1715, but the letters Pastoralis officii of Pope Clement XI provoked fierce conflict between the archbishop of Mechelen and the university. After legal proceedings, episodes of refusal of the sacraments similar to what occurred in France in the 1740s and an exile of professors to the Dutch Republic, the university appeared to submit to the bull and its papal interpretation in 1730.

The University of Leuven was, due to its alumni Baius and Jansen, the cradle of Jansenism and remained, during the 17th and 18th centuries until its suppression, the bastion and the hub of Jansenist Augustinian theology in Europe, with professors such as Jansen, Petrus Stockmans, Johannes van Neercassel, Josse Le Plat and especially the famous Zeger Bernhard van Espen and his students Johann Nikolaus von Hontheim or Charles Joseph Mathieu Lambrechts, professor of canon law, rector of the university in 1786, Freemason, and Minister of Justice in the French Directory under Napoleon. As Henri Francotte says, "Jansenism reigned supreme at the University of Leuven".

As late as 1818, Charles Lambrechts, former rector of the university, ex-senator and minister of Napoleon, recalled the 'vexations' of the Roman Catholic Church against his predecessor van Espen.

The encroachments of the Catholic clergy and their pretentions were so vexatious, that, in a time when their religion was dominant, no other remedy had been found for their abuse of power, other than the appeals in question. This is what prompted the famous van Espen to write, at the age of eighty, his treatise De recursu ad Principem, in order to put a barrier up against the ever-resurgent abuses of clerical jurisdictions; but this virtuous clergyman, who distributed to the poor all the income from the chair of canon law which he occupied at the University of Leuven, was soon obliged to resort to appeal for himself as from an abuse; still, this remedy could not entirely save him from persecution by intolerant priests. Burdened with years, glory and infirmities, he was forced to seek in Holland shelter from their vexations; he soon died in Amsterdam amid feelings of piety and resignation, after having spent his life defending the discipline and customs of the Early Church, of which he was the most zealous.

=== In the Dutch Republic ===
The Dutch Republic was the place of exile for many French Jansenists. They gathered first in Amsterdam, then increasingly in Utrecht. Since the 16th century, this small town had been the seat of the Dutch Mission aimed at the conversion of the Dutch who had become largely Reformed. Jansenist refugees from France and the Spanish Netherlands were made welcome, increasing the Jansenist influence among Dutch Roman Catholics. As a result, the Dutch Mission gained a strong Jansenist element in both theology and morality. Politically, the Dutch Jansenists were more inclined than other Roman Catholics to reach accommodation with the Protestant authorities and sought to make themselves independent of papal control. Moreover, theologically the Jansenist doctrines were considered to be closer to the dominant Dutch Reformed Protestantism. Dutch Jansenism (sometimes called 'Quesnelism' after Pasquier Quesnel) was accused by its opponents of being 'crypto-Calvinism within the Church'. The controversy between Jansenists and anti-Jansenists (the latter naturally led by the Jesuits) increasingly tore up the Dutch Roman Catholic Church in the late 17th and early 18th century, with the authorities of the Dutch Republic actively involved on the one side and the papacy and kings of France, Spain, Portugal, and Poland on the other. Moreover, some Dutch Roman Catholics seeking greater independence from papal control were identified as being 'Jansenists', even if not necessarily adhering to the theological doctrines of Jansenism.

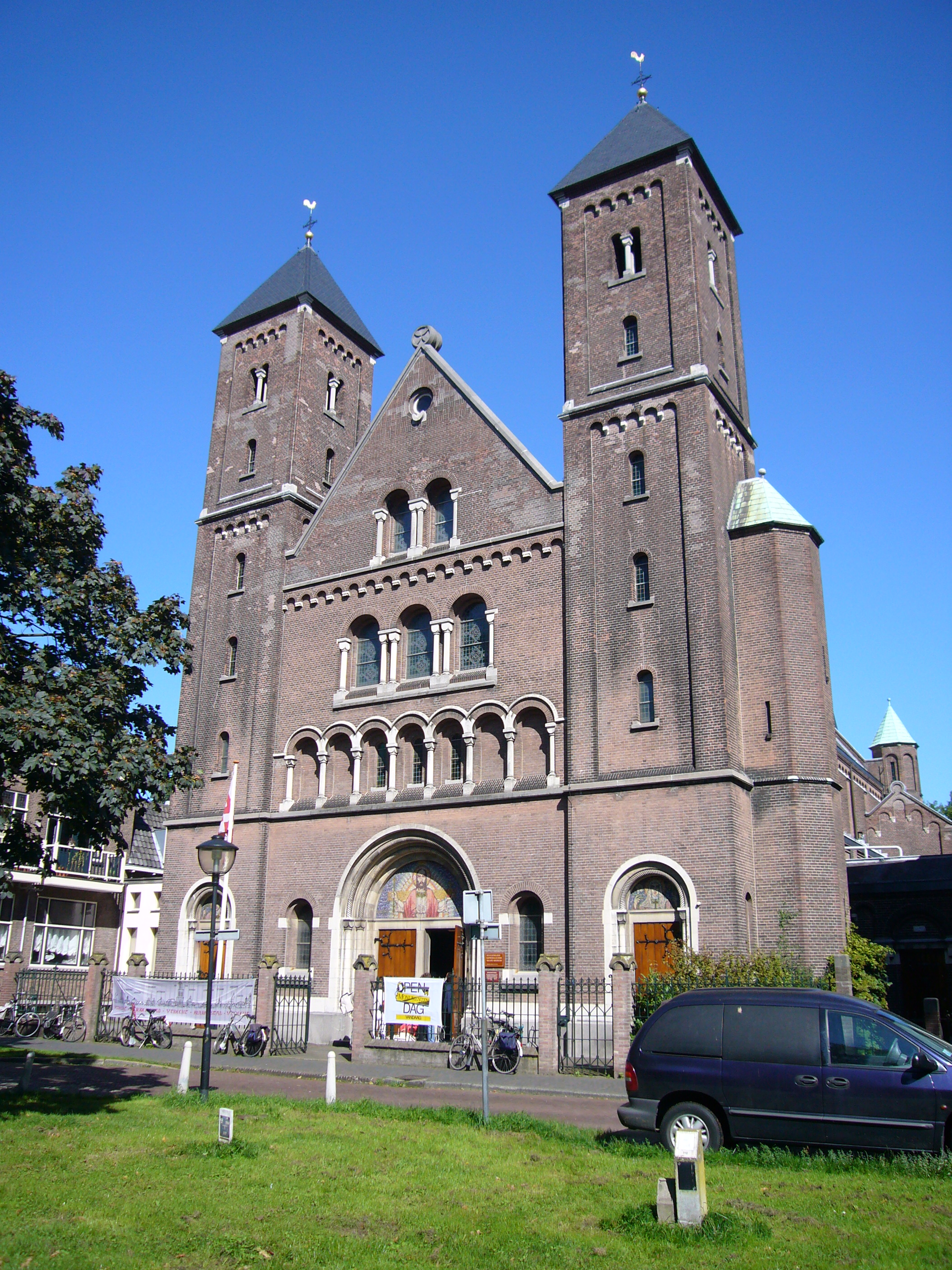
St. Gertrude's Cathedral, seat of the Archbishop of Utrecht and mother church of the Old Catholic Church, a small denomination of Christianity that remains in existence today, and which was influenced by Jansenism in its founding

The opposition towards the Jesuits and Roman Catholic clergy in general in the Republic of the 1680s prompted a more 'national attitude' among Dutch Roman Catholics, who began to stray from papal authority and adjust to their environment within their local hierarchies. The minority status of Roman Catholicism paradoxically allowed greater freedom for the local churches, which elected its bishop and had him confirmed by the pope, even if he only bore the title of 'vicar apostolic' so as not to irritate the government. Relations between Utrecht and French Jansenism had developed early on, since vicar apostolic Johannes van Neercassel, friend of Antoine Arnauld and Pasquier Quesnel, and in 1673 published an 'uncompromisingly Jansenist work', Amor Poenitens, which was frequently criticised by the Jesuits. His successor, Petrus Codde, who was influenced by Arnauld and Quesnel, and did much to promote Jansenism in the Dutch Mission including harbouring French Jansenist refugees, was suspended by Clement XI in 1702, despite his popularity with the local population. He appointed a successor who was unpopular with the local Roman Catholics. In August 1702, the States of Holland forbade Dutch Roman Catholics from recognising a vicar general who was not approved by its representatives. This meant that Dutch Roman Catholics were split between submitting to the authority of the Pope at the expense of the States or vice versa.

In April 1723, tensions culminated when the 'refractory' clergy appointed Cornelius van Steenoven as 'Archbishop of Utrecht', who the majority of the Roman Catholic laity supported, in opposition to papal authority, thus establishing a formal schism between the ultramontane and Jansenist-leaning Roman Catholics. The canons of Utrecht remained without a bishop for almost fifteen years, during which it was ministered mainly by exiled French Jansenists. French bishops also ordained Dutch priests to ensure the survival of this small church.

In 1724, Utrecht once again had bishops. It was the appelant Dominique Marie Varlet, coadjutor bishop of the diocese in partibus of Babylon, who settled in the Dutch Republic after fierce disputes with the Holy See. He agreed to successively ordain four bishops elected by the chapter of Utrecht. This is when the 'Little Church of Utrecht', now called the Old Catholic Church, was founded. With each new ordination of a bishop, the Church sent a request for canonical institution to the pope, who invariably condemned it as a schismatic body. Throughout the 18th century, these two rival Catholic Churches were active in competition. The question of whether, and to what degree, this breakaway church was Jansenist was highly controversial; the Jesuits having a clear polemical interest in emphasising its identification as such.

The links between the Old Catholic Church and the French Jansenists are numerous and lasting. From a place of refuge in the 18th century, Utrecht has become a place of conservation of Jansenist history and traditions. There are numerous French Jansenist archives in Utrecht and Amersfoort (where the seminary was located). The funds from the Perrette box were regularly used to partially finance this church. The French Jansenists hoped, until the middle of the 19th century, to have priests ordained by Utrecht to found a church of the same kind in France, although this project never came to fruition.

=== Italy ===
The influence of Jansenism in Italy can be explained with reference to the political fragmentation of the peninsula into numerous states that were traditionally hostile to the papacy. Relations with French Jansenists were established in the 17th century due to contacts established with religious orders, especially Benedictines and Dominicans. The Republic of Venice played an important role in the translation (into Latin or Italian) and dissemination of French Jansenist texts. However, Jansenist ideas only had an impact in northern Italy and did not pass south of Rome.

In the 18th century, it was the Kingdom of Piedmont-Sardinia and the Grand Duchy of Tuscany in particular that were influenced by Jansenism. By its proximity to France, and the fact that it is partly French-speaking, Piedmont constituted an ideal refuge for Jansenists. Thus, Jacques Joseph Duguet took refuge for a time at Tamié Abbey, while others found refuge in Chambéry. Joining the opposition to Unigenitus, Victor Amadeus II of Savoy expelled the Jesuits and replaced them with exiled Port-Royalists. In 1761, the bishop of Asti encouraged the priests to take a stand in favour of the Church in Utrecht. The Jansenists in exile therefore had significant influence in this part of Italy.

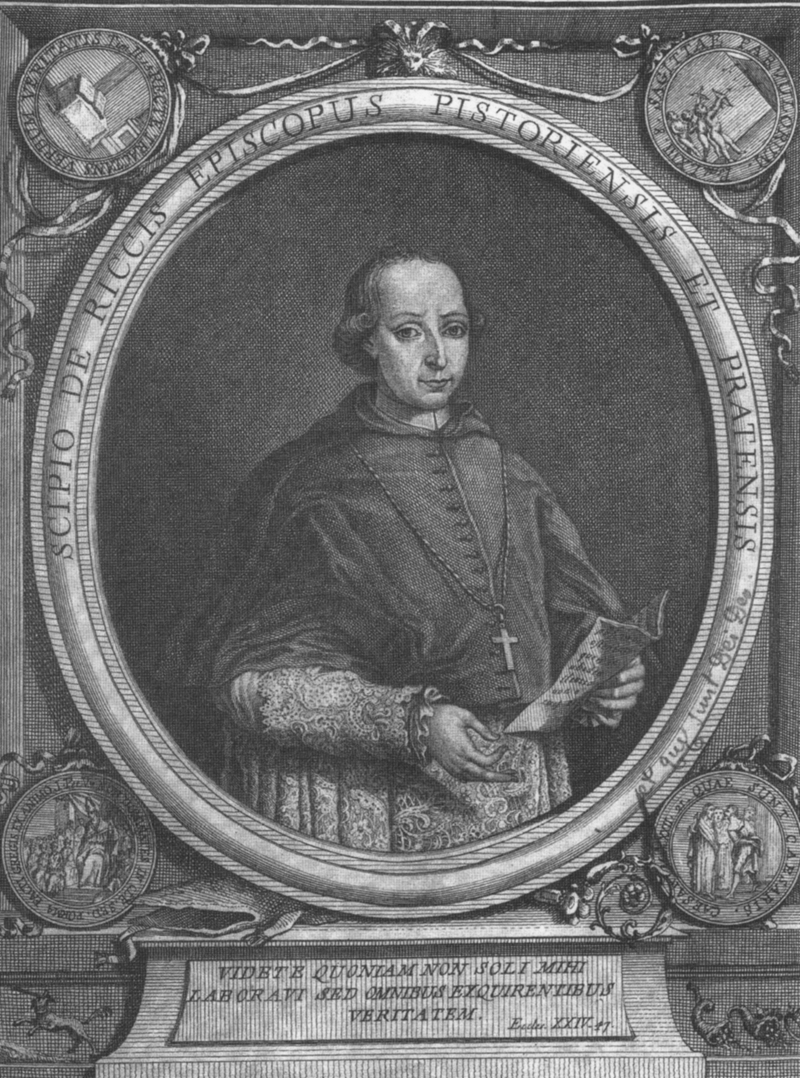
Scipione de' Ricci (1741–1810), Italian Roman Catholic bishop who was sympathetic to Jansenism. He attempted to have it formally approved at the Synod of Pistoia, but was firmly rejected by Pope Pius VI in his bull Auctorem fidei.

In the Italian territories under Habsburg Austrian domination, the situation was more complex. There, Jansenism encountered Josephinism, which guided Austrian policy at that time. Both systems worked to counter the influence of the pope and the Jesuits by applying the principle of the superiority of the state over religious affairs, which was characteristic of Gallicanism. Jansenism was therefore, in a sense, more moderate religiously but harsher politically, because it was mixed with the Gallican theology of Edmond Richer. In 1761, Empress Maria Theresa of Austria opened a seminary in Vienna in the Port-Royalist spirit, calling on professors from Leuven and Holland, and had as a confessor an influential Jansenist, the Abbot of Terme. He also established the Nouvelles ecclésiastiques in Vienna in 1784.

In Lombardy, a territory administered directly by Vienna, the theologians Pietro Tamburini, professor of the seminary at Brescia then at the University of Pavia, and Giuseppe Zola propagated the theology of Richer which was deeply imbued with Jansenism. They published works on grace in the same spirit as the Port-Royalist theologians. Their works influenced many clergymen, such as Scipione de' Ricci, bishop of Pistoia and Prato. He was previously vicar general of Florence, where he helped Grand Duke Peter Leopold carry out his religious reforms. De' Ricci was also interested in the Convulsionnaires, and sought to transform his diocese according to his convictions. Thus he introduced into his diocese the Catechism of Montpellier, which was particularly appreciated by Jansenists, distributed to his priests the Réflexions morales of Pasquier Quesnel, and finally convened a synod in Pistoia in 1786 to have his Jansenist orientation approved, along with a radical reform of the Latin liturgy. The synod and De' Ricci were firmly disavowed by Rome and he was forced to resign in 1791, while his positions were condemned by the papal bull Auctorem fidei in 1794.

The Republic of Genoa was also affected by Jansenism, where Port-Royalist writings were widely distributed. A Genoese priest, Eustache Degola, made contact with the French Jansenists at the end of the 18th century, and in particular with Henri Grégoire. At the time of the Concordat of 1801, he travelled with Grégoire throughout Europe and then settled between 1801 and 1810 at Port-Royal-des-Champs. He also had a significant influence upon the Francophile Italian elites. Thus, he converted Countess Manzoni, raised in the Reformed faith, who was the mother of the great Italian poet Alessandro Manzoni, during one of her visits to Paris. The influence of Italian Jansenism upon the founding fathers of the Risorgimento is well-known, since Camillo Benso, Count of Cavour, father of Italian unity, and Giuseppe Mazzini, Italian revolutionary, were immersed in the education of Jansenist priests.

== Jansenism in the 19th century and beyond ==
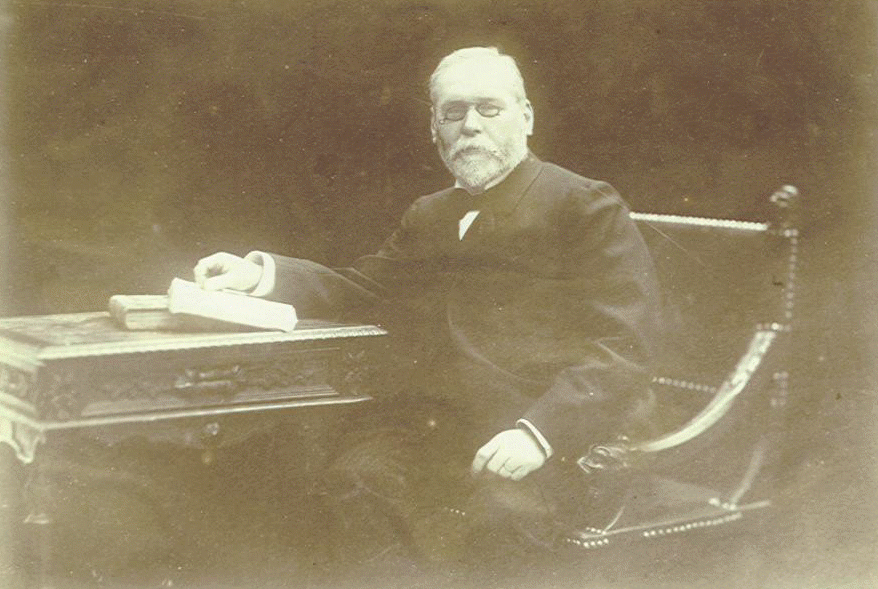
Augustin Gazier, 19th-century historian of Jansenism and Port-Royalist

The 19th century was the last century in which Jansenism, real or supposed, was still a force that could count in the Roman Catholic Church. Under this term the spiritual and material descendants of the 17th- and 18th-century Jansenists are amalgamated: those who formed the Société de Port-Royal ('Society of Port-Royal'), and the supporters of Gallicanism who attempted one last time to establish themselves before their disappearance following the First Vatican Council. The debates over grace and the authority of the pope were ended during this council, which proclaimed papal infallibility and established ultramontanism, causing Jansenism to gradually disappear from theological discourse.

Jansenism then became a way of being, a qualifier synonymous with austerity and moral rigour, rather than a theological doctrine. In 1891, Léon Séché described Jansenism and Jansenists in this way.

The old quarrel of Jansenism has had its day, and the name 'Jansenist', far from harming those it names, is rather designed to win them esteem and respect. [...] Because there is a Jansenist state of mind, just as there is an Orléanist state of mind. It's quite difficult to define, but so it is. [...] In private life, if this man is even the slightest part Jansenist, he will be mysterious and withdrawn, rigid and severe in morals. Simple and straight, sober and hard on his body, he will pass nothing on to others in terms of conduct. Gullible to the point of superstition, he will draw all kinds of horoscopes from the Scriptures and see the finger of God everywhere. In politics, he can be a monarchist as well as a republican, the form of government being, in short, indifferent to him, but he will always be constitutional and liberal. Of religion, he may not practice, nor ever approach the sacraments, but believes himself to be a very good Christian.

However, some wars were still being waged against ultramontanism and in defence of the memory of Port-Royal and Jansenism. Thus, newspapers appeared throughout the 19th century, defending the Gallican and Jansenist tradition of the Church in France. After the disappearance of the Annales de la religion in 1803, Henri Grégoire and a few survivors of the Constitutional Church including Claude Debertier published between 1818 and 1821 the Chronique religieuse ('Religious chronicle'), described by Augustin Gazier as a 'combat magazine'. It defended the constitutional priests who refused to submit to the Concordat of 1801 and who were deprived of absolution and sometimes of the sacraments by their bishops (such as Grégoire himself). The tone was openly Gallican and defended Jansenism while denying that it was anything other than the traditional doctrine of the Church, "Jansenism is the doctrine of grace effective in itself, that is to say the necessity, for every good work, of a grace by which God produces in us will and action. Now this is the doctrine of the Church; therefore those who are attached to it are pure and good Catholics." The tone was less forceful than in the Nouvelles ecclésiastiques or the Annales de la religion. A few years later, a defensive journal was reborn, designed with the same principle; the Revue ecclésiastique ('Ecclesiastical magazine'). This monthly review appeared from 1838 to 1848. It was designed, financed and distributed by the men of the Parisian Jansenist society grouped within the Société de Port-Royal. The organisation was very hierarchical and was based on a core of full members who delegated the writing of articles to provincial correspondents. The Revue ecclésiastique became known above all for the harsh debates it had with ultramontane publications. But it always remained within the limit of written debate, despite the widespread practice of pseudonymy for the editors of the articles. The authors based their arguments on their reading of numerous canonical, historical and theological works contained in the Parisian Jansenist libraries. The magazine did not at all approve of the publication of Port-Royal by Charles Augustin Sainte-Beuve.

Two reasons have prevented us until now from talking about the work of Mr. Sainte-Beuve. 1) the scant real value of a book in which the author poses as a man of the world and a philosopher to judge the actions, doctrines and feelings of men who are essentially and above all Christians; 2) the extent and difficulty of the work to be done to identify all the errors and blunders into which Mr. Sainte-Beuve must necessarily have fallen by placing himself in the point of view he has chosen.

The last magazine intended to defend Jansenism in the 19th century was L'Observateur catholique ('The Catholic Observer'), which appeared from 1855 to 1864. It was first led by the former editors of the Revue ecclésiastique, and quickly joined by a priest with an assertive character; a defender of Gallicanism and critic of the Jesuits, Wladimir Guettée. L'Observateur catholique was a magazine with a strong polemical tone, which detailed in its columns what it considered to be the errors of the Church in France. Its exchanges with L'Univers of Louis Veuillot were coarse. The magazine also caused a scandal in 1856 by commenting at length and harshly on each of the courses on Port-Royal and Jansenism given to the faculty of theology by the young abbot Charles Lavigerie, until he abandoned his courses after two years.The publication of the magazine ceased in 1861 in the midst of some confusion, when Abbé Guettée converted to Eastern Orthodoxy.

During the 19th century, Jansenists were part of the abolition societies in France. The Jansenists had criticised Jesuit missions in the New World and advocated for liberation.

In Dilexit nos, Pope Francis argued that new forms of Jansenist dualism could still be identified within the life of the Roman Catholic Church:

a baneful Jansenist dualism has re-emerged in new forms. This has gained renewed strength in recent decades, but it is a recrudescence of that Gnosticism which proved so great a spiritual threat in the early centuries of Christianity because it refused to acknowledge the reality of "the salvation of the flesh". For this reason, I turn my gaze to the heart of Christ and I invite all of us to renew our devotion to it. I hope this will also appeal to today’s sensitivities and thus help us to confront the dualisms, old and new, to which this devotion offers an effective response.

=== As a stereotype ===
"Jansenism: we don't know what it is, but it's fashionable to talk about it."

— Gustave Flaubert, Dictionary of Received Ideas

Jansenism in the 19th century was also a stance, a qualifier allocated to certain politicians or intellectuals representing moral rigorism and an attachment to Gallican principles. This was how a certain number of politicians of the Bourbon Restoration, the July Monarchy or the French Third Republic were frequently associated with Jansenism, such as Pierre Paul Royer-Collard, Victor Cousin or Jules Armand Dufaure.

By the 20th century, the term 'Jansenist' was most often associated with personalities having no other trait in common with the Jansenists of the 17th century than a noticeable moral rigour and austerity. Lionel Jospin was thus described as representing "Jansenist, demanding, rigorous democracy", while the bullfighter José Tomas was described as "the Jansenist of the arena, the incorruptible of the muleta" by Télérama. In the 21st century, one researcher has remarked that 'Jansenism' is still commonly used as a pejorative by Catholics, especially in reference to a stereotype of a "Catholic Calvinism" with a "morbid preoccupation with Hell, sexual purity, moral rigor, and clerical authority."

== Jansenism in art ==
- Robert Bresson was a filmmaker influenced by Jansenism.
- 1969: My Night at Maud's, a film by Éric Rohmer. The film deals in part with Pascalian morality and Jansenism. Rohmer returns to the subject in A Tale of Winter (1992).
- 1969: The Milky Way, a film by Luis Buñuel, features a duel between a Jesuit priest and a Jansenist.
- 1991: All the World's Mornings, a novel by Alain Courneau, which features Jean de Sainte-Colombe, a follower of Jansenist philosophy.
- 2006: Fragments sur la grâce, a film by Vincent Dieutre.
- 2009: The Portuguese Nun, a film by Eugène Green.

== See also ==
- Antoine Le Maistre
- Augustinian soteriology
- Crypto-Protestantism
- Dale K. Van Kley
- Jean Racine
- Molinism
- Saint-Medard, Paris
