= Arnauld family =

Arnauld
- Noble family
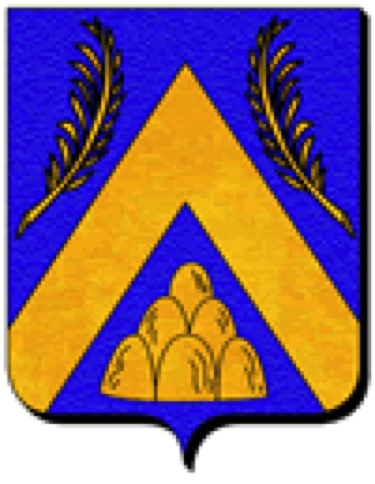
- Azure, a chevron Or, in chief two palms addorsed, and in base a rock of six coupeaux, all the same.
- Origin: Auvergne

The Arnauld or Arnaud family Lord de la Mothe, de Bessac, de la Besse, de Villeneuve, de Ronzière et d'Artonne, then d'Andilly, de Corbeville and Marquess de Pomponne is a noble French family prominent in the 17th century, and closely associated with Jansenism, associating frequently with the Jansenist religious communities in Port-Royal de Paris and Port-Royal des Champs. While their base of operations was in Paris, the family's roots is in the Auvergne region of France.

== History ==
Ennobled in 1464, the Arnauld family held many prestigious functions: Isaac Arnauld (-1561) was general of the Carabineers in the Royal Army, Simon Arnauld de Pomponne (1618–1699) was a royal ambassador and Antoine Arnauld was the royal State Counselor to King Henry IV and General Prosecutor for Queen Catherine of Medicis in 1582

The family is divided into several branches. The oldest, Arnauld de Pomponne and Arnauld d'Andilly are now extinct. Another branch of the family, divided into two sub-branches; the Arnauld de la Ronzière and Arnauld d'Artonne are still represented today.

One of the most memorable figure is Antoine Arnauld (b. 1560, d. 1619 CE). Legendarily, the "original sin" that led to the Jesuits (among others) becoming bitter foes to the Arnaulds was a speech given in 1594 by Antoine (an eloquent lawyer) apologizing for the University of Paris against the Jesuits. Of Antoine's and Catherine Marion de Druy's 20 children, only ten would survive childhood- but 9 of them would become involved in the Port-Royal projects, going on variously to become poets, authors, translators, monks etc. Indeed, Marie Angélique de Sainte Madeleine, (b. 1591, d. 1661) would become an abbess of the Port-Royal Cistercian house, where she is remembered for her reforms (prompted by St. Francis de Sales). One of the aforementioned authors was Antoine Arnauld (b. 1612, d. 1694), who spent his efforts on attacking the Jesuits from his position in the Sorbonne, while his elder brother (and sister of Madeleine) Robert Arnauld d'Andilly, (b. 1588, d. 1674) spent his life at the Port-Royal translating texts and writing noted religious poetry.

== Family tree ==
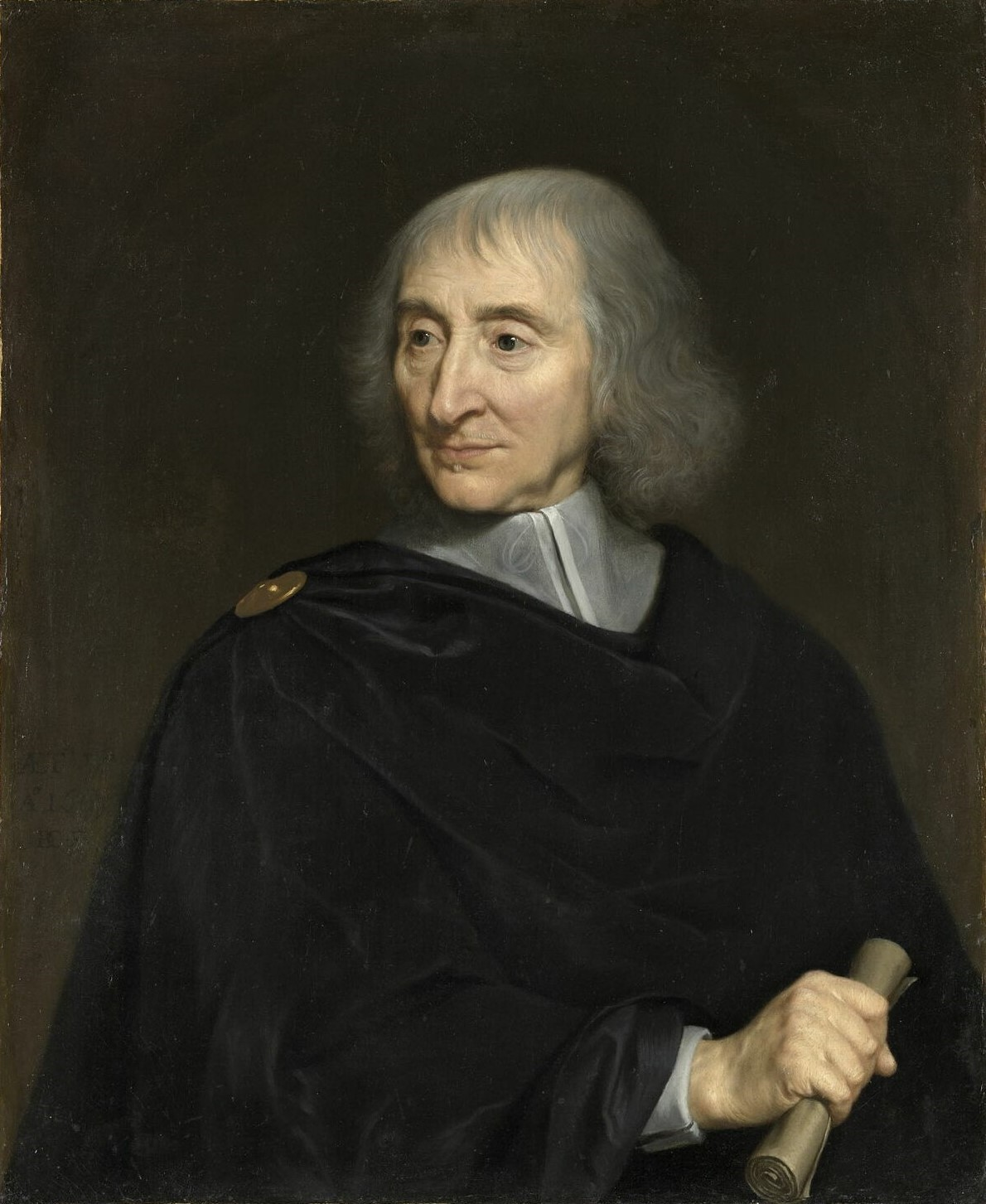
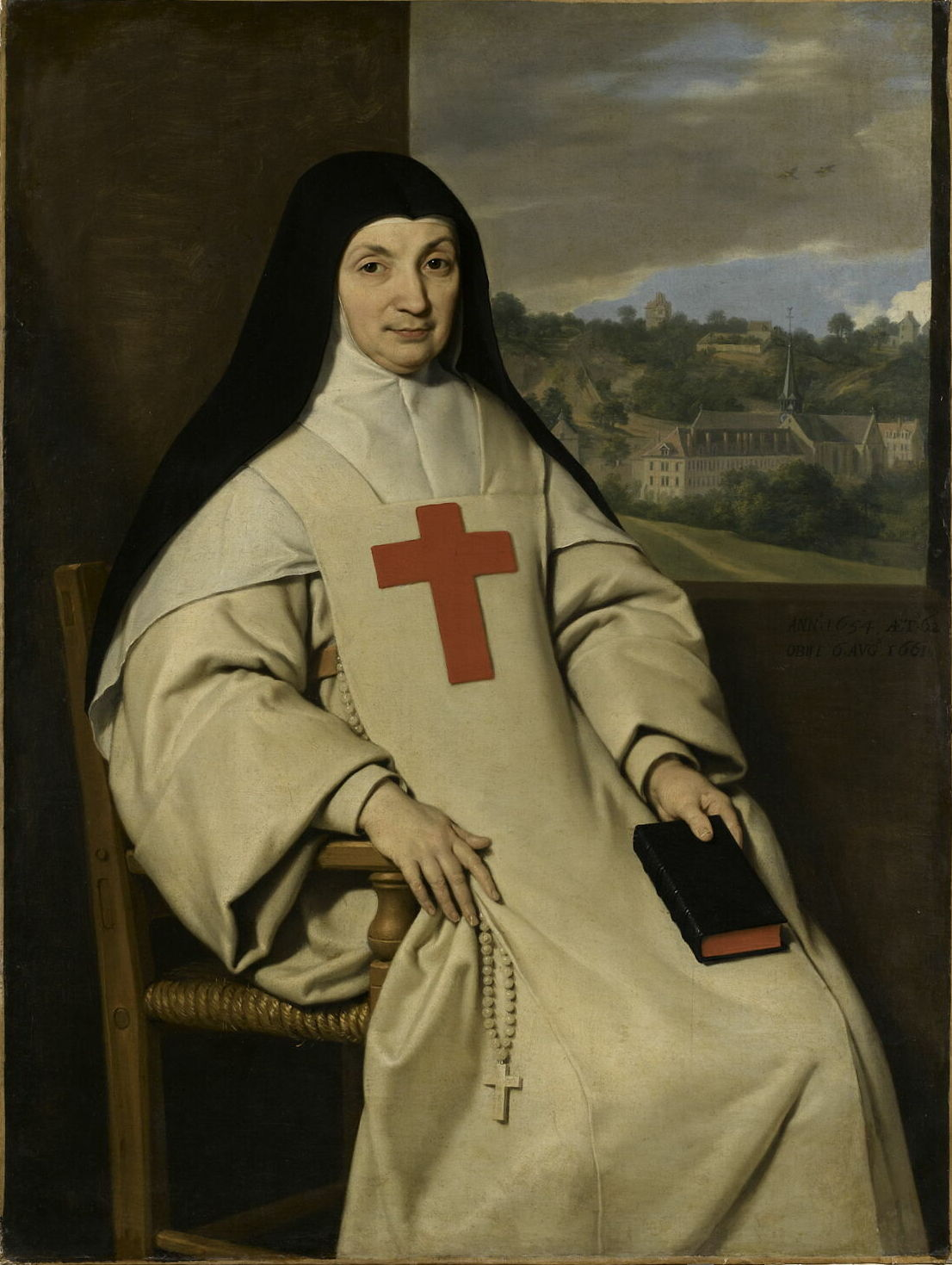
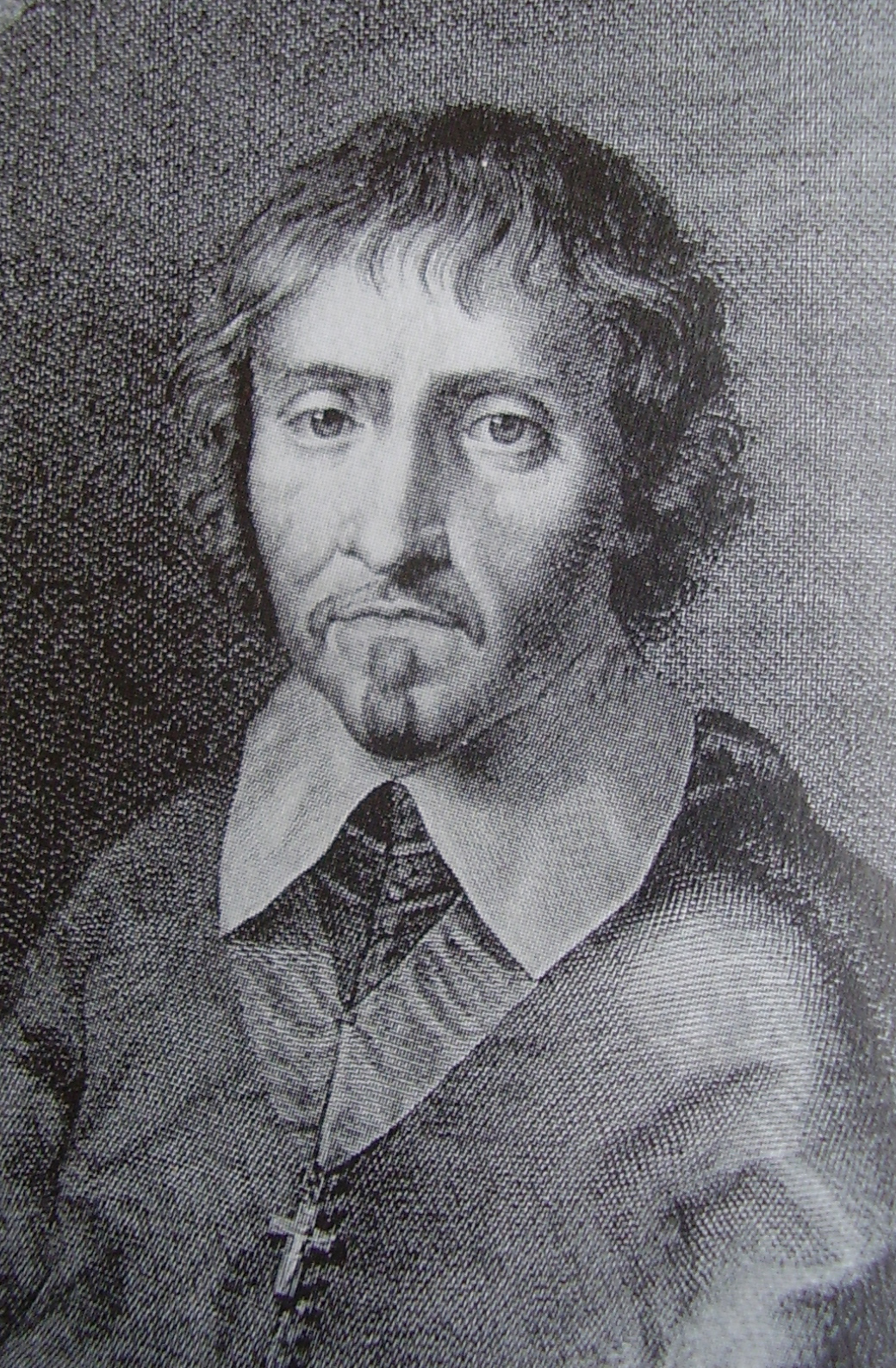
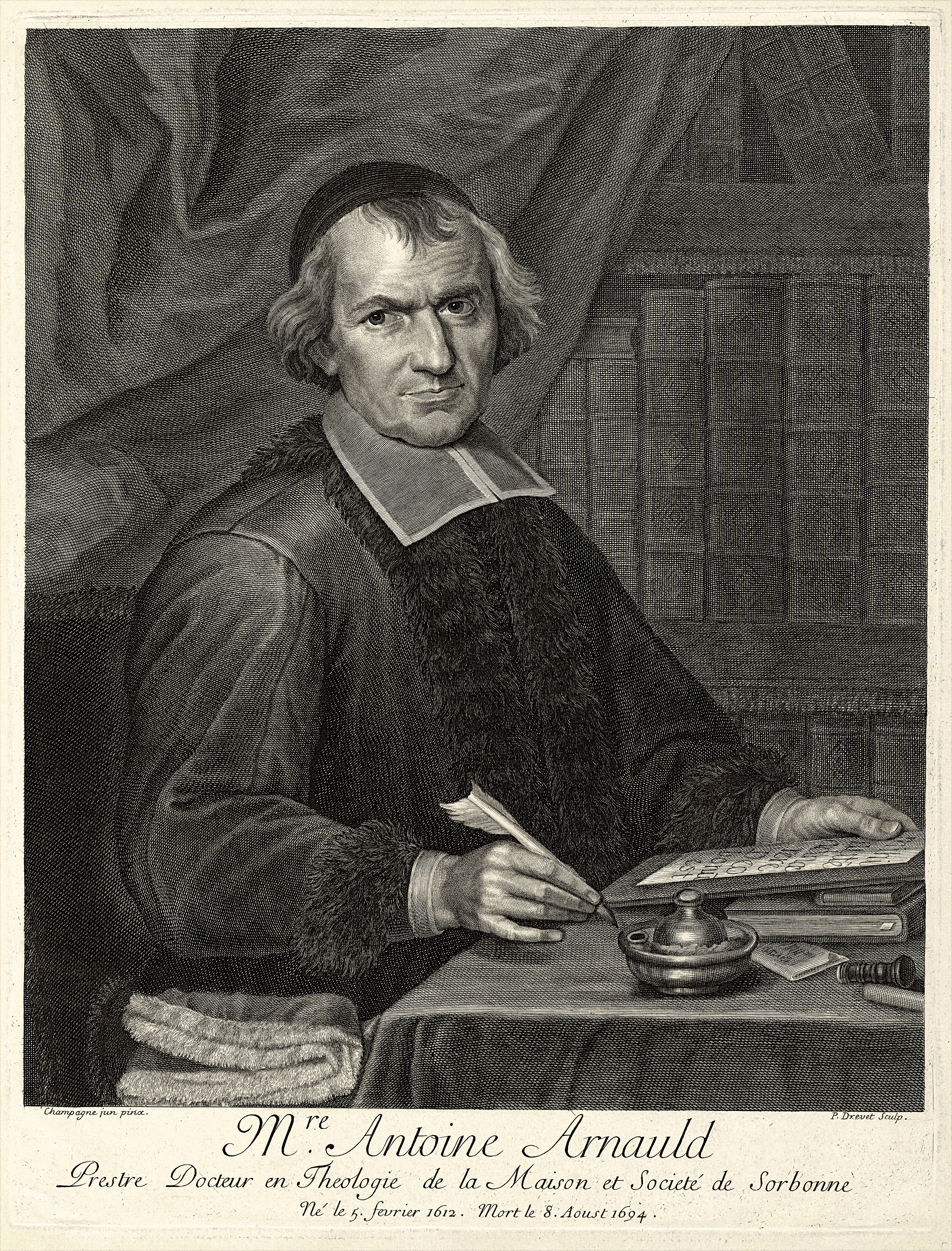
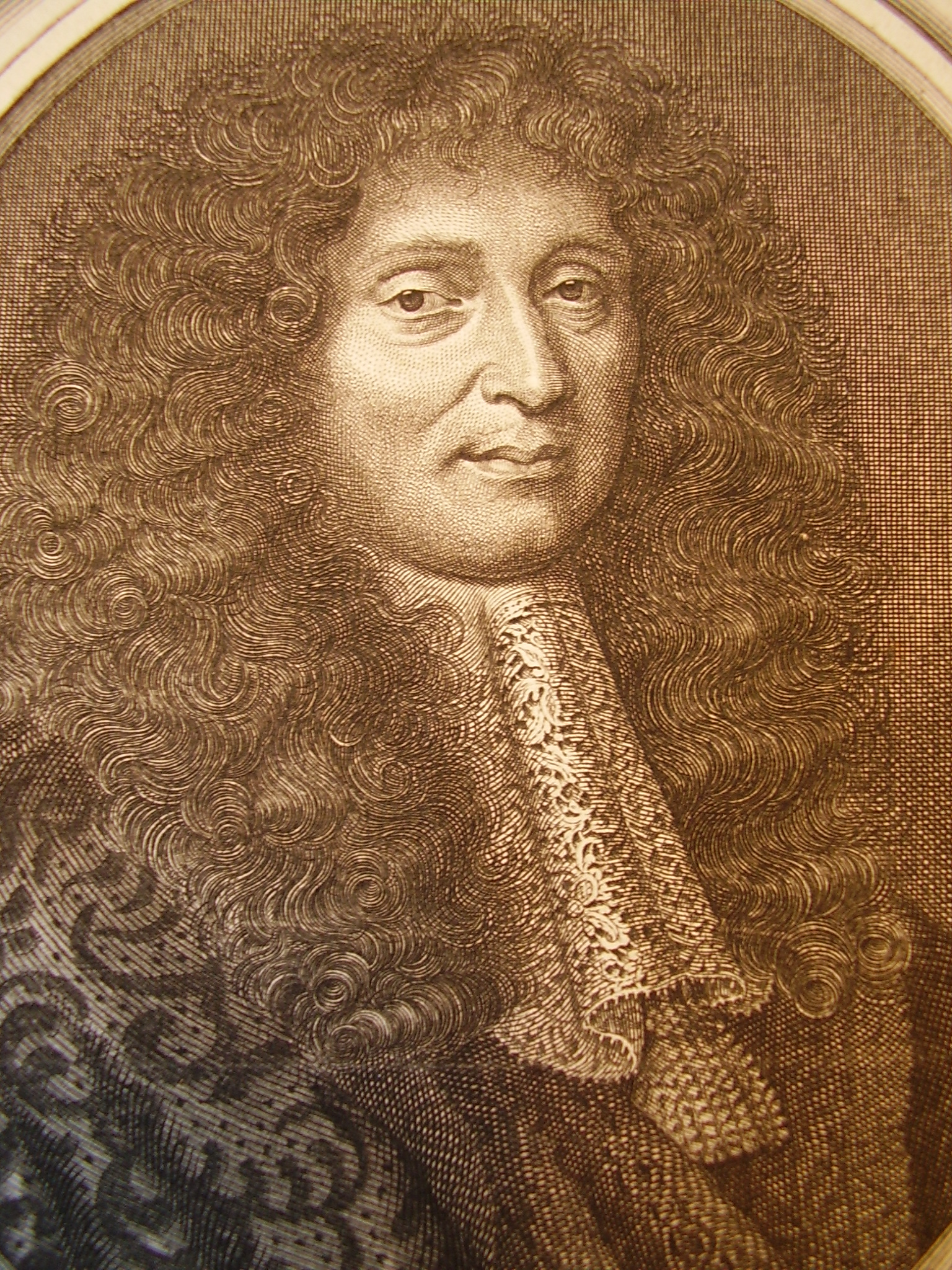
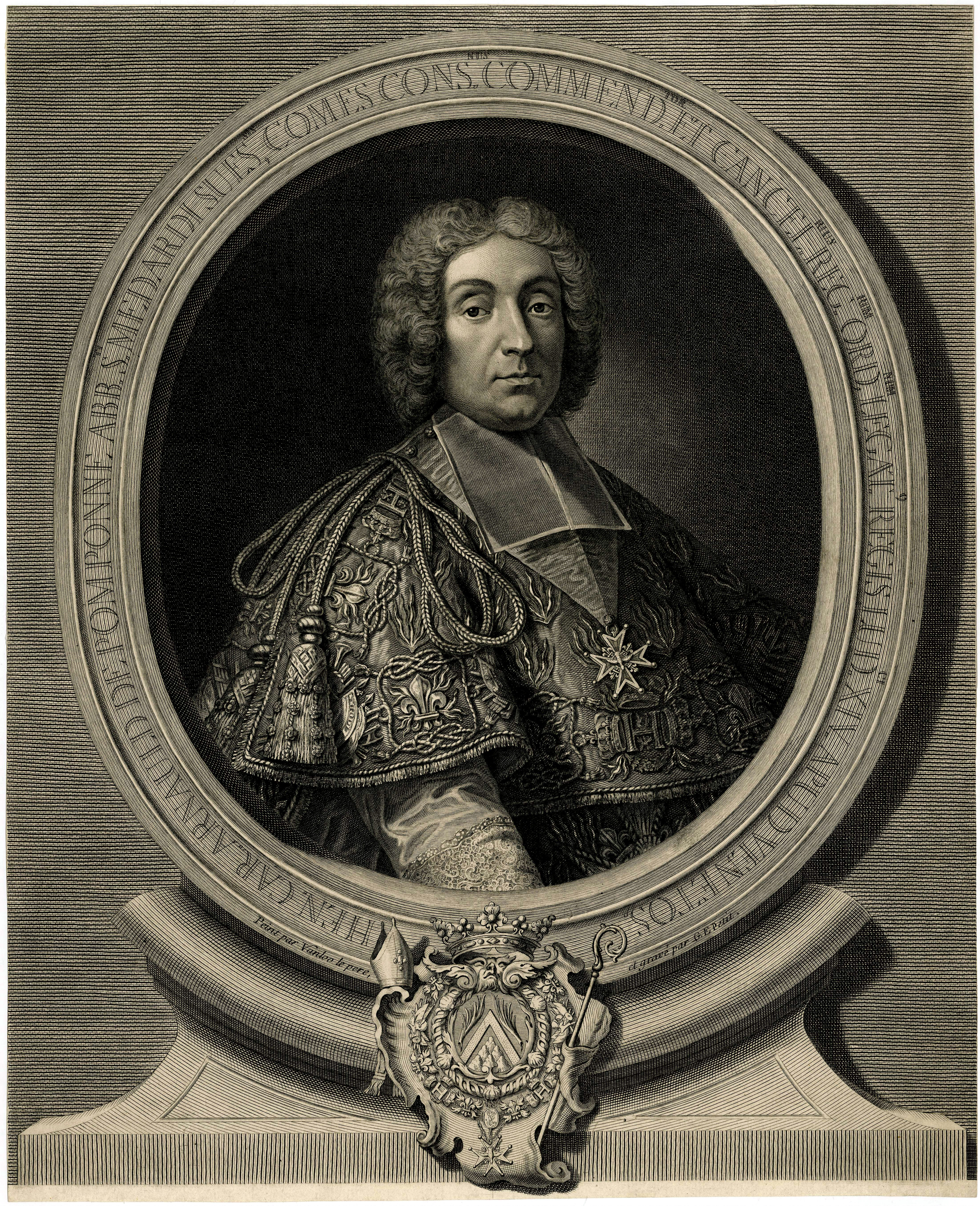
Antoine Arnauld (1560–1619)	Isaac Arnauld (1566–1617)
Robert Arnauld d'Andilly (1589–1674)	Catherine Arnauld (1590–1661)	Angélique Arnauld (1591–1661)	Agnès Arnauld (1593–1672)	Henri Arnauld, bishop of Angers (1597–1692)	Antoine Arnauld, known as le Grand Arnauld (1612–1694)
Antoine Arnauld, known as l'abbé Arnauld (1616–1698)	Simon Arnauld de Pomponne (1618–1699)	Angélique de Saint-Jean Arnauld d'Andilly (1624–1684)
Henri Charles Arnauld de Pomponne (1669–1756)

== Heraldry ==
Coat of arms of Arnauld
Escutcheon Azure, a chevron Or, in chief two palms addorsed, and in base a rock of six coupeaux, all the same.
