= Antoine Arnauld (lawyer) =

French lawyer (1560–1619)

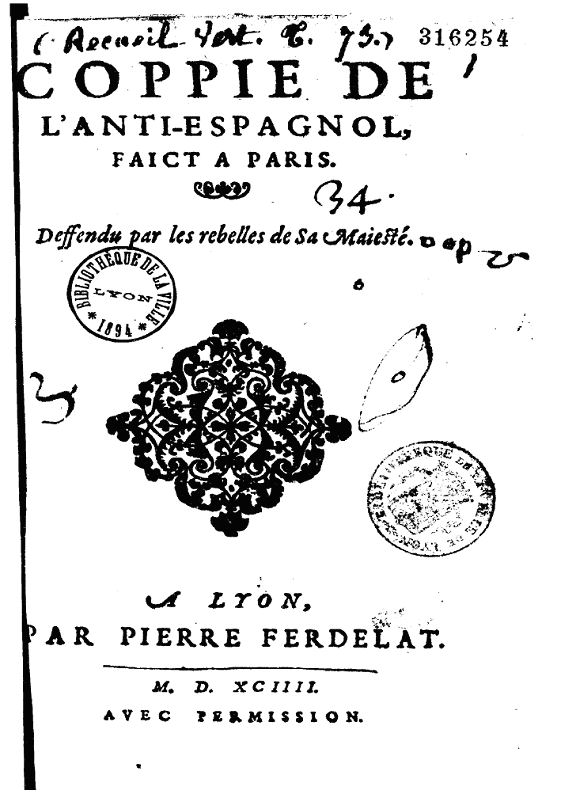
1594 pamphlet by Antoine Arnauld

Antoine Arnauld (6 August 1560, Paris – 29 December 1619, Paris) was a lawyer in the Parlement de Paris, and a Counsellor of State under Henry IV.

== Life ==
Antoine Arnauld was the son of the general advocate of Catherine de' Medici. Raised a Protestant, he is thought to have converted to Catholicism after the St. Bartholomew's Day massacre. A skilled orator, his most famous speech was in 1594 in favor of the University of Paris and against the Jesuits, decrying their lack of support for Henry IV, newly converted from Protestantism to Catholicism.

He wrote a number of political pamphlets which were widely distributed. The best known of his writings is entitled Le franc et véritable discours du Roi sur le rétablissement qui lui est demandé des Jésuites (1602). He was married to Catherine Marion de Druy, daughter of Simon Marion, baron de Druy, advocate general of Henry IV. They had twenty children, ten of whom survived him.

== Notable descendants ==
=== Children ===
- Robert Arnauld d'Andilly (1588–1674), courtier and author
- Catherine Lemaistre (1590–1651)
- Marie Angelique Arnauld (1591–1661), Abbess of Port Royal
- Agnès Arnauld (1593–1672), Abbess of Port Royal
- Gabrielle Arnauld
- Henri Arnauld (1597–1692), bishop of Angers
- Antoine Arnauld (1612–1694), theologian, philosopher and mathematician

=== Grandchildren ===
- Antoine Le Maistre (1608–1658), lawyer, author and translator
- Simon Arnauld de Pomponne (1618–1699), diplomat
- Antoine Arnauld (1616–1698), memoirist
- Angélique de Saint-Jean Arnauld d'Andilly, nun
