= Pierre Thomas (scholar) =

French scholar and author

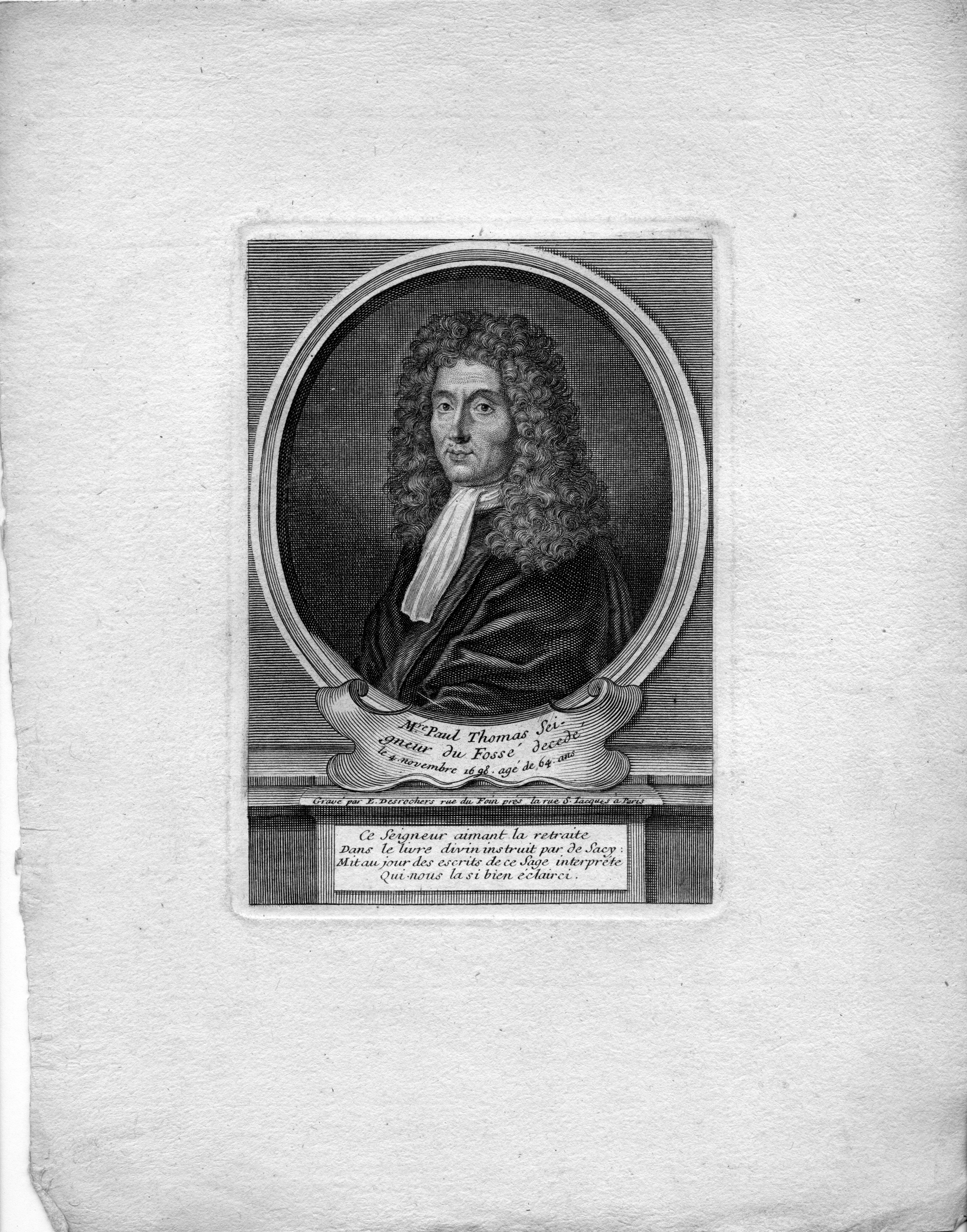

Pierre Thomas, sieur du Fossé (1634–1698) was a French scholar and author, and was the son of a master of accounts at Rouen. He was sent as a child to be educated to the Jansenists at Port-Royal des Champs. There he received his bent towards the life of a recluse, and even of a hermit, which drew him to establish himself in the neighborhood of Port-Royal des Champs. There he associated with Louis-Sébastien Le Nain de Tillemont, Antoine Singlin, Robert Arnauld d'Andilly and Antoine Le Maistre.

In 1661 he came to Paris, and in 1666 was arrested along with Louis-Isaac Lemaistre de Sacy, and after a month in the Bastille was exiled to his estate of Fossé near Forges-les-Eaux. He later made yearly visits to Paris during the winter months. Apart from his collaboration with de Sacy on a French translation of the Bible, Thomas wrote some hagiographic works and left Mémoires (1697–1698 and again 1876–1879), which are highly praised by Sainte-Beuve as being a remarkable mirror of the life at Port-Royal.

He also wrote under the pseudonymes Pierre Thomas Beaulieu and Pierre Thomas La Motte.
