= 1695 in literature =

This article contains information about the literary events and publications of 1695.

== Events ==
- April – The Parliament of England decides not to renew the Licensing Order of 1643, thus effectively abolishing most press censorship.
- unknown dates
  - After twelve years of de facto theatrical monopoly in London, the senior actors of the mismanaged United Company break away to form a rival cooperative company led by Thomas Betterton, Elizabeth Barry and Anne Bracegirdle. This makes a brilliant start with the première on April 30 of William Congreve's comedy Love for Love, at the New Theatre, Lincoln's Inn Fields.
  - Antoine Le Maistre and his brother Louis-Isaac Lemaistre de Sacy complete their translation of the Catholic Bible into French (the Bible de Port-Royal).
  - Wren Library, Cambridge, the library of Trinity College, designed by Christopher Wren, is completed.

== New books ==
=== Prose ===
- Mary Astell (anonymous) – A Serious Proposal to the Ladies, for the Advancement of Their True and Greatest Interest
- Charles Blount – Miscellaneous Works (ed. Charles Gildon)
- Gilbert Burnet – An Essay on the Memory of the Late Queen (see 1694 in literature, as many memorials were written to Mary II of England)
- Jeremy Collier – Miscellanies upon Moral Subjects: The second part
- John Dennis – The Court of Death
- John Dryden – De Arte Graphica (trans. of Charles Alphonse du Fresnoy)
- Laurence Echard – The Roman History (vol. I)
- "N. H." – The Ladies Dictionary, being a general entertainment of the fair-sex: a work never attempted before in English (published by John Dunton)
- Nicolaas Heinsius the Younger – The Delightful Adventures and Wonderful Life of Mirandor (Den vermakelijken Avanturier)
- William Laud – The History of the Troubles and Tryal of William Laud
- John Locke
  - Further Considerations Concerning Raising the Value of Money
  - The Reasonableness of Christianity as Delivered in the Scriptures
  - A Vindication of the Reasonableness of Christianity (reply to John Edwards)
- John Norris – Letters Concerning the Love of God (letters to Mary Astell)
- Sir William Petty – Quantulumcunque Concerning Money (published posthumously)
- John Phillips – A Reflection on Our Modern Poetry
- Sujan Rai – Khulasat-ut-Tawarikh
- Robert South – Tritheism (vs. William Sherlock)
- Sir William Temple – An Introduction to the History of England
- Lionel Wafer – A New Voyage and Description of the Isthmus of America
- Ned Ward – Female Policy Detected; or, The Arts of a Designing Woman Laid Open
- Wu Chucai and Wu Diaohou (compiled and edited) – Guwen Guanzhi, anthology of more than 200 works from Warring States period to Ming dynasty

=== Children ===
- Charles Perrault – Histoires ou contes du temps passé. Les Contes de ma Mère l’Oye (Tales and stories of the past with morals. Tales of Mother Goose)

=== Drama ===
- John Banks – Cyrus the Great
- Catherine Trotter Cockburn – Agnes de Castro
- William Congreve – Love for Love
- Robert Gould – The Rival Sisters
- George Granville – The She-Gallants
- Charles Hopkins – Pyrrhus King of Epirus
- Peter Anthony Motteux – The Loves of Mars and Venus
- George Powell – Bonduca, or the British Heroine
- Elkanah Settle – Philaster; or, Love Lies A-Bleeding (adapted from Fletcher's Philaster)
- Thomas Scott – The Mock Marriage
- Thomas Southerne – Oroonoko, or The Royal Slave: a tragedy (adapted from Aphra Behn's novel Oroonoko)
- Ariadne – She Ventures and He Wins

=== Poetry ===
- Joseph Addison – A Poem to His Majesty
- Richard Blackmore – Prince Arthur
- Colley Cibber – A Poem on the Death of our Late Sovereign Lady, Queen Mary
- William Congreve – The Mourning Muse of Alexas: A pastoral (on Mary II)
- John Milton – The Poetical Works of Mr John Milton (ed. Patrick Hume)
- Matthew Prior – An English Ballad: In answer to Mr Despreaux's Pindarique ode on the taking of Namure
- Richard Steele – The Procession: A poem on Her Majesties funeral
- See also 1695 in poetry

== Births ==
- April 8 – Johann Christian Günther, German poet (died 1723)
- September 20 – Hedvig Catharina Lillie, Swedish salonnière (died 1745)

== Deaths ==
- February 7 – Dorothy Osborne (Lady Temple), English letter writer (born 1627)
- April 13 – Jean de la Fontaine, French poet and fabulist (born 1621)
- April 17 – Juana Inés de la Cruz, Mexican poet (born 1651; plague)
- April 23 – Henry Vaughan, Welsh metaphysical poet (born 1622)
- June 11 – André Félibien, French court historian (born 1619)
- August 12 – Huang Zongxi, Chinese political theorist (born 1610)
- October – Sir William Killigrew, English playwright and courtier (born 1606)
- November 28 – Anthony Wood, English antiquary (born 1632)
