= Martin de Barcos =

French Catholic priest and theologian

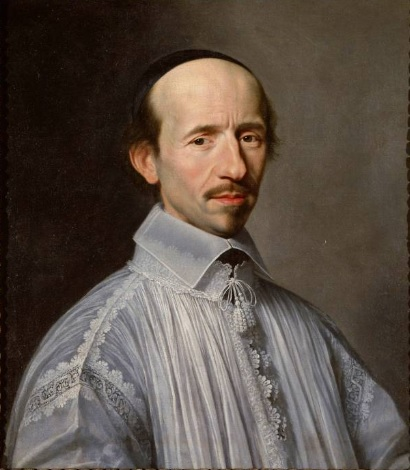
Philippe de Champaigne, Portrait de Martin de Barcos, 1646, Magny-les-Hameaux, Musée national de Port-Royal des Champs

Martin de Barcos (1600 – 1678), was a French Catholic priest and theologian of the Jansenist School.

== Life ==
Barcos was born at Bayonne, a nephew of Jean du Vergier de Hauranne, the commendatory abbot of the Abbey of Saint-Cyran-en-Brenne in the Duchy of Berry, who sent him to Belgium to be taught by Cornelius Jansen. When he returned to France he served for a time as tutor to a son of Robert Arnauld d'Andilly and later, in 1644, succeeded his uncle as the owner of the abbey. He did much to improve the abbey; new buildings were erected, and the library much enhanced.

Unlike many commendatory abbots of his day, however, who scarcely ever saw the monasteries over which they held authority, Barcos became an active member of the abbey, became a priest in 1647, and gave himself up to the rigid asceticism preached by his sect. He died there.

Barcos' ties with Du Vergier and Arnauld and, through them, with the Abbey of Port-Royal-des-Champs, soon brought him to the front in the debates about Jansenism. He collaborated with his uncle in the Petrus Aurelius and with Arnauld in the book on Frequent Communion.

== Writings ==
Barcos wrote three treatises on authority in the Catholic church:

- De l'autorité de saint Pierre et de saint Paul (1645)
- Grandeur de l'Église de Rome qui repose sur l'autorité de saint Pierre et de saint Paul (1645)
- Éclaircissements sur quelques objections que l'on a formées contre la grandeur de l'Église de Rome (1646).

In these books, he argued in support of an assertion contained in the book On Frequent Communion, namely: "St. Peter and St. Paul are the two heads of the Roman Church and the two are one." This theory of dual church authority, implying an equality of the two apostles, was condemned as heretical by Pope Innocent X in 1674 (Denzinger, Enchiridion, 965).

His other works discuss grace and predestination, popularly debated issues of his day. These include:

- A censure of Jacques Sirmond's Praedestinatus (1644)
- Quae sit Sancti Augustini et doctrinae eius auctoritas in ecclesia? (1650), in which Barcos holds that a proposition clearly founded on St. Augustine can be absolutely accepted and taught, regardless of a papal bull. For this he was condemned by Pope Alexander VIII, 1690 (Cf. Denzinger, no. 1187).
- Exposition de la foy de l'Église romaine touchant la grâce et la prédestination (1696), written at the request of the Jansenist Bishop of Aleth, Nicolas Pavillon. Condemned by the Holy Office in 1697, and again in 1704 when it was published with the Instructions sur la grâce of Antoine Arnauld.
