= Angélique de Saint-Jean Arnauld d'Andilly =

French Jansenist nun

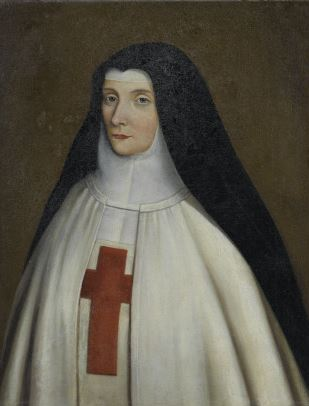
Angélique de Saint-Jean Arnauld d'Andilly

Angélique de Saint-Jean Arnauld d'Andilly (28 November 1624 – 29 January 1684) was a French Jansenist nun. Niece of Angélique Arnauld, daughter of Robert Arnauld d'Andilly, and sister of Antoine Arnauld and Simon Arnauld, Angélique de Saint-Jean Arnauld d'Andilly was from the Jansenist Arnauld family.

== Life ==
She entered the Port-Royal-des-Champs in 1641 and taken her vows on 25 January 1644. Becoming sub-prior in 1653, she and her four sisters heavily opposed the formulary. Arrested in August 1664, she was held at the convent of the Annonciades until 1665. Refused the sacraments until the Clementine peace in 1669, she was made abbess in 1678.

== Works ==
Angélique de Saint-Jean Arnauld d'Andilly published an account of her captivity (1711), the Conférences, the Réflexions, the Relations. She was also a collaborator on the Nécrologe de l'Abbaye de Notre-Dame de Port-Royal des Champs, Ordre de Cîteaux, Institut du Saint Sacrement; qui contient les éloges historiques avec les épitaphes des fondateurs & bienfaiteurs de ce monastère, & des autres personnes de distinction (1723).

- Aux portes des ténèbres : Relation de captivité, Préf. Sébastien Lapaque; notes de Louis Cognet, Paris, Table ronde, 2005 ISBN 2-7103-2721-X
- Relation de la captivité de la mère Angélique de Saint Jean, religieuse de Port-Royal des Champs, Paris, Gallimard, 1954
- Mémoires pour servir à l'histoire de Port Royal; et à la vie de la Révérende Mère Marie Angélique de Sainte Magdeleine Arnauld, Réformatrice de ce Monastère, Utrecht, [s.n.], 1742
- Lettres de la mère Angélique de S. Jean à Mr. Arnaud, écrites depuis que la communauté fut transférée à Port-Royal des Champs jusqu'à la paix de l'Église, [S.l.s.n], 1600–1699
- Conférences de la mère Angélique de Saint Jean, abbesse, sur les constitutions du monastère, 1665
- Discourse of Angélique de Saint-Jean called ‘Miséricordes’
- Discourses on the Rule of Saint Benedict
- On the Danger of Hesitation and Doubt once we know our duty
