= Louis-Isaac Lemaistre de Sacy =

French theologian and humanist (1613–1684)

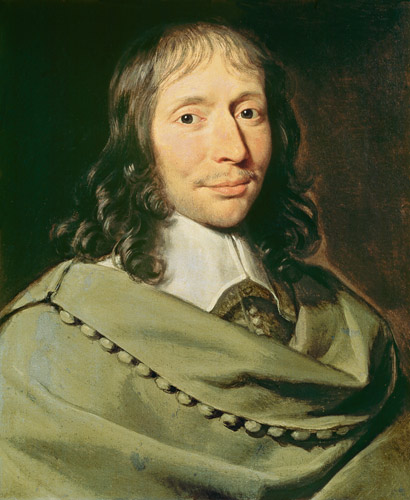
Portrait of Louis-Isaac Lemaistre de Sacy, lord of Port-Royal, or of Antoine Le Maître, his elder brother, by the workshop of Philippe de Champaigne

Louis-Isaac Lemaistre de Sacy (29 March 1613 – 4 January 1684), a priest of Port-Royal, was a theologian and French humanist. He is best known for his translation of the Bible, the most widespread French Bible in the 18th century, also known as the Bible de Port-Royal.

== Biography ==
Louis-Isaac Lemaistre de Sacy was born in Paris, one of five sons of Huguenot Isaac Le Maistre, and of Catherine Arnauld, who was one of the sisters of Marie Angélique Arnauld. In 1638, when his older brothers Antoine and Simon gave up their careers to retire to Port-Royal, Louis-Isaac joined them to take care of his education.

In 1650, he published a collection of prayers, the Heures de Port-Royal, in which he translated the highly successful liturgical hymns.

De Sacy was imprisoned in the Bastille on 13 May 1666, remaining there until 14 November 1668. He took advantage of this time to complete the translation of the Old Testament into French from the Vulgate begun by his brother Antoine, and thus became the driving force behind a French language translation of the Bible, called the Bible du Port-Royal or Bible de Sacy. After his release, Louis-Isaac devoted much of his time to revising his translation, and drafting the Commentaires that he wanted to accompany each of the books of the Bible.

From 1672 to 1684, the date of his death, de Sacy published 10 additional books of the Bible. Using the manuscripts left by de Sacy, his friend Pierre Thomas (1634–1698) pursued this task, and undertook the publication, from 1685 to 1693.

In 1696, La Sainte Bible contenant l'Ancien et le Nouveau Testament (The Holy Bible containing the Old and New Testament) was published in 32 volumes.

== A Bible in French ==
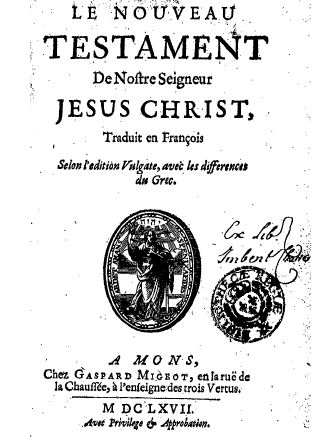
Page de garde du Nouveau Testament published by de Sacy in 1667.

In the 12th century, the first French version of the Bible was created by Pierre de Vaux, chief of Vaudois. There followed the translation of Guyart des Moulins, composed in the late 13th century and printed in 1488, and then that of René Benoît, published in Paris in 1566, with marginal notes but which was censored as containing certain Calvinist "heresies".

De Sacy's is better known than previous translations and has been much reproduced. It was really the first translation of the Bible accessible to the non-Latin reading general public.

The initiative of translation of the Vulgate came from the lawyer Antoine Le Maistre (1608–1658), who was the brother of Louis-Isaac, but that translation was not a good fit.

On his brother's death (1658), Louis-Isaac then began with his friends at Port-Royal (including Blaise Pascal, Robert Arnauld d'Andilly, Pierre Nicole, and Pierre Thomas) a revision of his Biblical translation, complete with additional books, Greek texts, and the New Testament. This new translation was to be published in Mons in 1667, taking the name Nouveau Testament de Mons.

It was presented as a 2-volume in octavo. A new version, corrected by Beaubrun, was published in Paris in 1717 in 3 volumes in-folio, with a fourth volume containing the Biblical apocrypha, the Old Testament, the writings of apostolic times, the prefaces of Saint Jerome, and essays on various Biblical matters.

== Characteristics of de Sacy's Bible ==
Some theologians criticized the translation of de Sacy as sometimes deviating from the letter of the original for no apparent reason. Others saw it as sober and elegant. Sacy's annotations were criticised for favouring the theories of Cornelius Jansen.

The Bible de Port-Royal was founded on work carried out in logic at the Port-Royal Abbey in Paris (see Port-Royal Logic). This system of logic proposed to apply mathematical reasoning to other fields of knowledge and thought, including the syntactic and grammatical elements of all statements of language, offering an ideal of a rational language which could reconcile the spirit of finesse and the spirit of geometry: the discourse par excellence.

== See also ==
- Port-Royal Logic

== Bibliography ==
- The Bible de Sacy was reissued in 1990 in Bouquins. ISBN 2-221-05867-4
- Abbé Dardenne. L'enseignement théologique en France. Paris 1870. Voir tome III, Les principales versions françaises de la Bible et du Nouveau Testament.
