= Isaac Arnauld =

French noble

Isaac Arnauld (1566 – 14 October 1617), seigneur de Corbeville, was a member of the Arnauld family, a French family which during the 17th century produced several major Jansenists. He was the younger brother of Antoine Arnauld, and his son (also Isaac Arnauld) had a prestigious military career.

He was made Intendant des finances of the kingdom of France by Sully. King Henry IV supported his becoming a surintendant des finances, shortly before his death. He trained his nephew Robert Arnauld d'Andilly in financial administration. He created the hôtel de Guémené, now in the place des Vosges.

Madeleine de Scudéry and Robert Arnauld d'Andilly traced his portrait in their works.

== Sources ==
- Tallemant des Réaux. Historiettes, Tome II, p. 374. Troisième édition. Librairie J. Techener, Paris, 1862.
- Raymon Baustert, La consolation érudite. Huit études sur les sources des lettres de consolation de 1600 à 1650, p. 248. Gunter Narr Verlag, Tübingen, 2003. ISBN 3-8233-5553-8.
