= Bible de Port-Royal =

French translation of the Catholic Bible

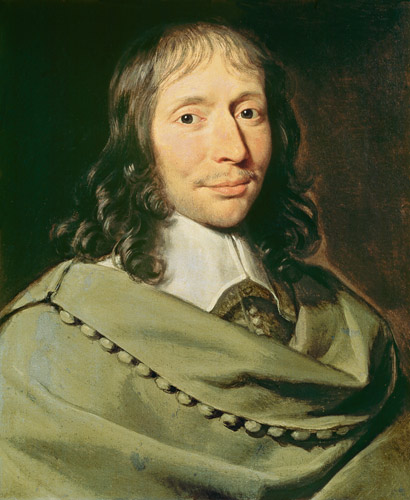
Portrait of Louis-Isaac Lemaistre de Sacy, lord of Port-Royal, or of Antoine Le Maître, his elder brother, by the workshop of Philippe de Champaigne

The Bible de Port-Royal ("Port-Royal Bible"), or Bible de Sacy ("Sacy Bible"), is a French translation of the Catholic Bible done by Louis-Isaac Lemaistre de Sacy. It was first published in installments between 1667 and 1696. Though praised for the purity of its classical form, the work attracted the suspicion of the Jesuits, who discovered in it a latent Protestantism, and was criticized by Richard Simon, a former Oratorian, on text-critical grounds. For over three centuries, it has been among the most popular of the French Bible translations.

== History ==
Several Solitaires of Port-Royal, (Note: Antoine Arnauld, Pierre Nicole, Claude Lancelot, Antoine Le Maistre, and Louis-Isaac Lemaistre de Sacy.) an early Jansenist monastery, had met to consider the viability of a New Testament translation from 1657 to 1660. One of them, Antoine Le Maistre, began the task of translation in 1657, and his brother, Louis-Isaac Lemaistre de Sacy, continued the work after the former's death in 1658. The Nouveau Testament de Mons (or Version de Mons), their translation of the New Testament, was published in 1667 by Daniel Elzevier. The Old Testament appeared in several parts between 1672 and 1696.

In 1688, Antoine Arnauld published a defence of the translation project against charges of latent Protestantism, the Défense des versions de langue vulgaire de l'Écriture Sainte, in which he argued that, just as the Vulgate had been a translation of the Scriptures into the vernacular of the day, so a translation into French, which had undergone significant reforms at the end of the sixteenth century, was necessary to ensure the intelligibility of the Bible to the common man.

The translation was a "masterpiece of French literary classicism", but was censured by Jacques-Bénigne Bossuet for its "politeness". The Jansenist Martin de Barcos objected that the translators had demystified the Scriptures. Richard Simon, a textual critic and former Oratorian, complained that the work was more interpretative paraphrase than translation, and noted with disapproval the use of the Vulgate "avec les différences du Grec" ("with corrections from the original Greek") as the basis of the translation's version of the New Testament. Nonetheless, the translation was an immediate success. The philosopher Blaise Pascal, who had seen an early draft of the translation, quoted from its version of the New Testament in his Pensées.
