= Antoine Le Maistre =

French translator, writer and lawyer

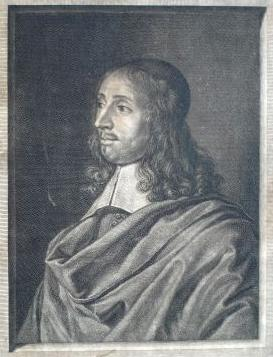
Engraving by Charles Louis Simonneau, c. 1695, after a portrait by Philippe de Champaigne

Antoine Le Maistre (2 May 1608 – 4 November 1658) was a French lawyer, author and translator. His name has also been written as Lemaistre and Le Maître, and he sometimes used the pseudonym of Lamy.

== Background and early life ==
Le Maistre was the son of Isaac Le Maistre, a king’s counsellor, and of Catherine Arnauld, who was the eldest daughter of the lawyer Antoine Arnauld (1560–1619) and the granddaughter of another Antoine Arnauld, seigneur de la Mothe. The Arnaulds were a family of the lesser nobility which had come to Paris from the Auvergne during the 16th century.

Le Maistre's grandfather Arnauld, a well known lawyer, defended the University of Paris against charges laid by the Jesuits in 1594 and presented his case so forcefully that his defence has been called the original sin of the Arnaulds. He married Catherine Marion de Druy, and they had twenty children, of whom ten died young. All but one of their ten surviving children were connected with the Jansenist abbey of Port-Royal des Champs. In 1629, Arnauld's widow, Le Maistre's grandmother, became a nun at Port-Royal de Paris, where she died in 1641. Among her children were Antoine Arnauld (1612–1694), called the Great Arnauld, the leading Jansenist theologian of the 17th century in France; Jacqueline-Marie-Angélique Arnauld, known as Mère Angélique, who became abbess of Port-Royal des Champs, transferred the religious community to Paris and made it into a great centre of Jansenism; Jeanne-Catherine-Agnès Arnauld, known as Mère Agnès, also an abbess of Port-Royal; Henri Arnauld (1597–1692), who after a diplomatic career was ordained as a priest and went on to become bishop of Angers; and three other daughters who became nuns of Port-Royal des Champs.

At the age of seven, the young Le Maistre moved with his mother and brothers into the household of his grandfather Antoine Arnauld and was brought up there. Influenced towards a career in the law, after his grandfather's death Le Maistre also considered going into the church, but he trained as a lawyer.

== Career ==
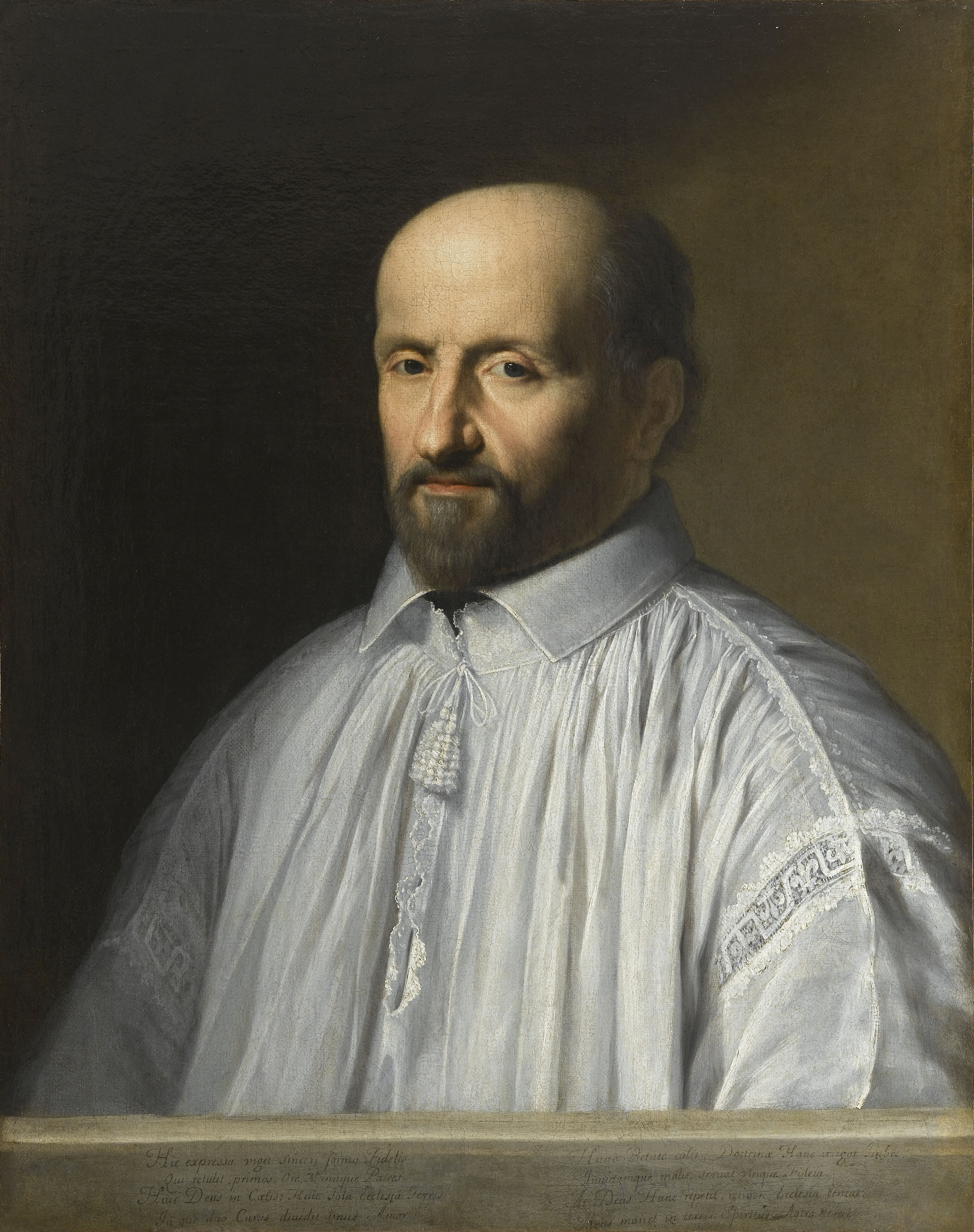
Jean du Vergier de Hauranne, abbot of Saint-Cyran

Le Maistre quickly became a famous young advocate, with Guez de Balzac writing of him that his "powerful, rich and magnificent harangues would have aroused jealousy in Cicero and Demosthenes". But at the time of the civil war called the Fronde, Le Maistre spectacularly gave up the bar and retired to Port-Royal at the instigation of Jean du Vergier de Hauranne, abbot of Saint-Cyran, placing himself under Saint-Cyran's spiritual direction. Le Maistre was then a little less than thirty. He announced his decision in a letter to his father written after three months of reflection.

This decision has come to me from Him who is master of our will, and who changes it when he sees fit. I leave the world because he wishes me to, as you yourself would leave it, and your religion, too, if he so wished; and, without having had any particular revelations or any visions out of the ordinary, I am only the voice which calls to me out of the Gospel to repent of my sins.

Le Maistre's withdrawal from public affairs displeased Cardinal Richelieu, who was unhappy at the loss of a talented jurist.

On 10 January 1638 Antoine and his brother Simon Le Maistre settled at Port Royal de Paris, where they were soon joined by their brothers Louis-Isaac, Jean and Charles. Later the same year, Le Maistre and others, including two of his brothers, established a Jansenist ascetic group known as les solitaires (the hermits) at Port-Royal des Champs, under the spiritual direction of the abbot of Saint Cyran. At the request of Saint Cyran, the brothers Le Maistre took children into their homes to teach them according to Cyranian principles.

The arrest of Saint-Cyran on 14 May 1638 put an end to this life of the solitaires as teachers. First of the Solitaires, Antoine Le Maistre settled permanently at Port Royal des Champs in August 1639, where he led a quiet and austere life. In about 1644, he was joined in his ascetic religious community by his uncle Robert Arnauld d'Andilly (1588–1674), a poet and translator whose career had been in the government's service and who became the editor of Saint-Cyran's Lettres chrétiennes et spirituelles (1645).

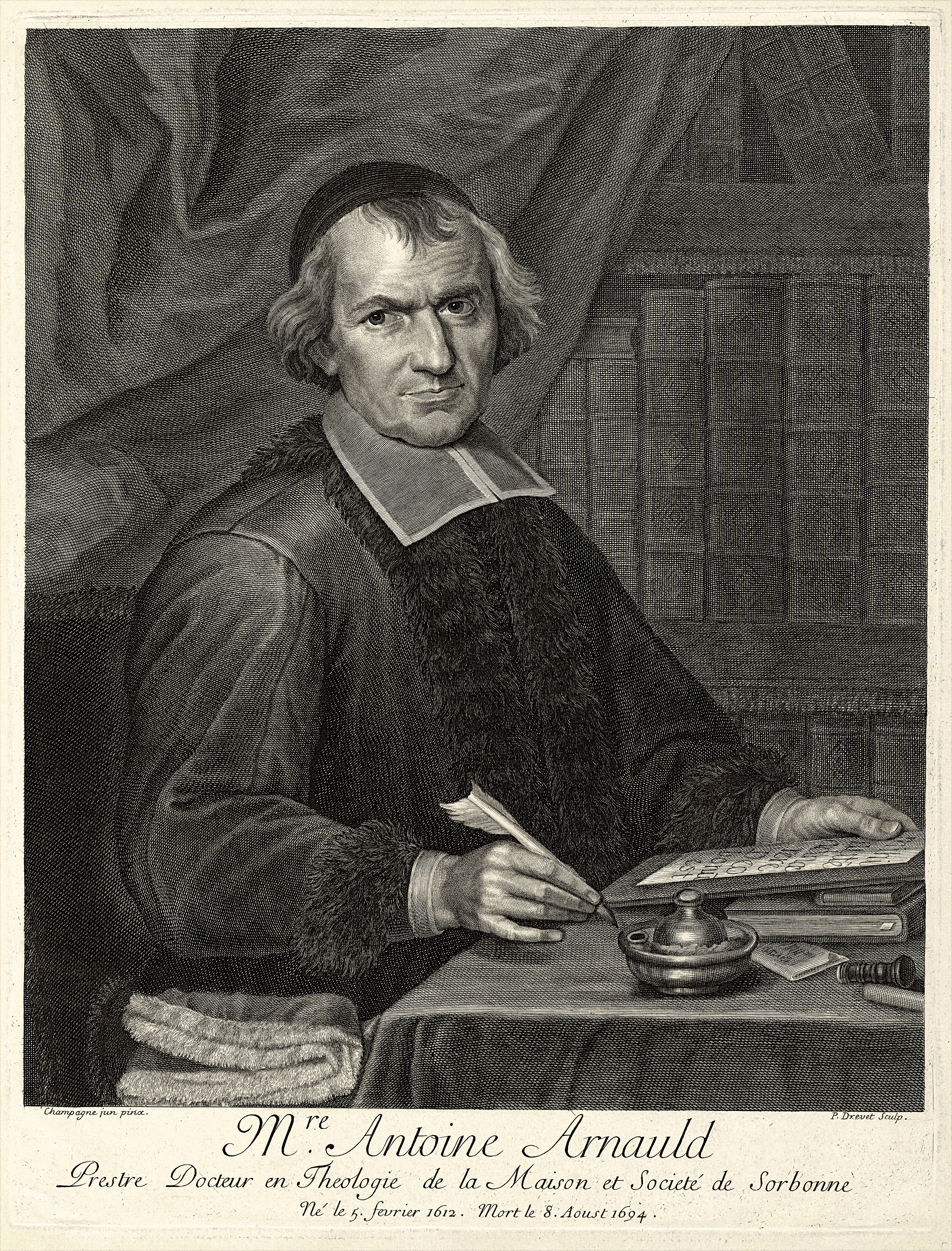
Le Maistre's uncle Antoine Arnauld

Le Maistre became a friend of Jean Racine and dedicated himself to translation work and to writing the lives of saints.

He claimed that France's long-standing affiliation with freedom was to do with its being a Christian nation. He wrote:

The God of the Christians is the God of liberty. By taking the form of a servant, he lifted us from servitude; he broke our chains; he made us to walk with our head held high... This kingdom is not that of France but that of Jesus Christ.

With his cousin Angélique de Saint-Jean, Le Maistre persuaded their aunt Angélique Arnault, abbess of Port-Royal, to write an autobiography, which was mostly the story of her community's heroic resistance in the face of its religious tribulations.

In 1656, an anti-Jansenist campaign was mounting in France, and Le Maistre went into hiding in Paris with his uncle Antoine Arnauld, then on trial for Jansenist views before the Faculty of Theology in Paris, and with the philosopher Pascal, who before that had been living at Port-Royal. Le Maistre helped Pascal to write Lettres provinciales (1656–1657), a series of letters in defence of Arnauld.

Le Maistre died on 4 November 1658 after a short illness, leaving a considerable body of work.

His youngest brother was Louis-Isaac Le Maistre de Sacy (1613–84), also a follower of Saint-Cyran. He was ordained a priest in 1649, became confessor to the nuns of Port-Royal and the solitaires, and was much respected by the Jansenists.

At the time of his death, Antoine Le Maistre had begun a new translation of the New Testament. This was continued by his brother Isaac, who became its principal translator. The new work was published in 1667 as Le Nouveau Testament de Nostre Seigneur Jesus Christ: traduit en François selon l'edition Vulgate, avec les differences du Grec, and printed in Amsterdam for Gaspard Migeot, a bookseller of Mons. It thus became known as the Nouveau Testament de Mons, or the Testament of Mons.

== Likenesses ==
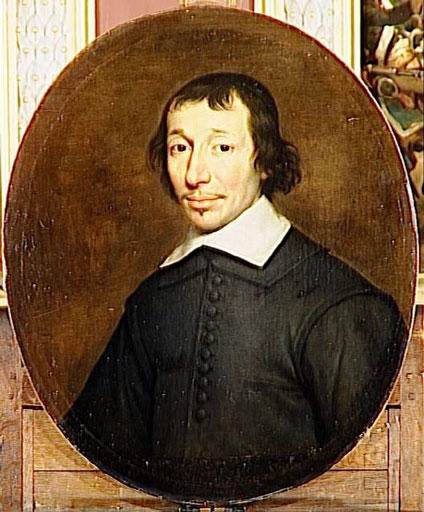
Le Maistre's brother Louis-Isaac Le Maistre de Sacy, studio of Philippe de Champaigne

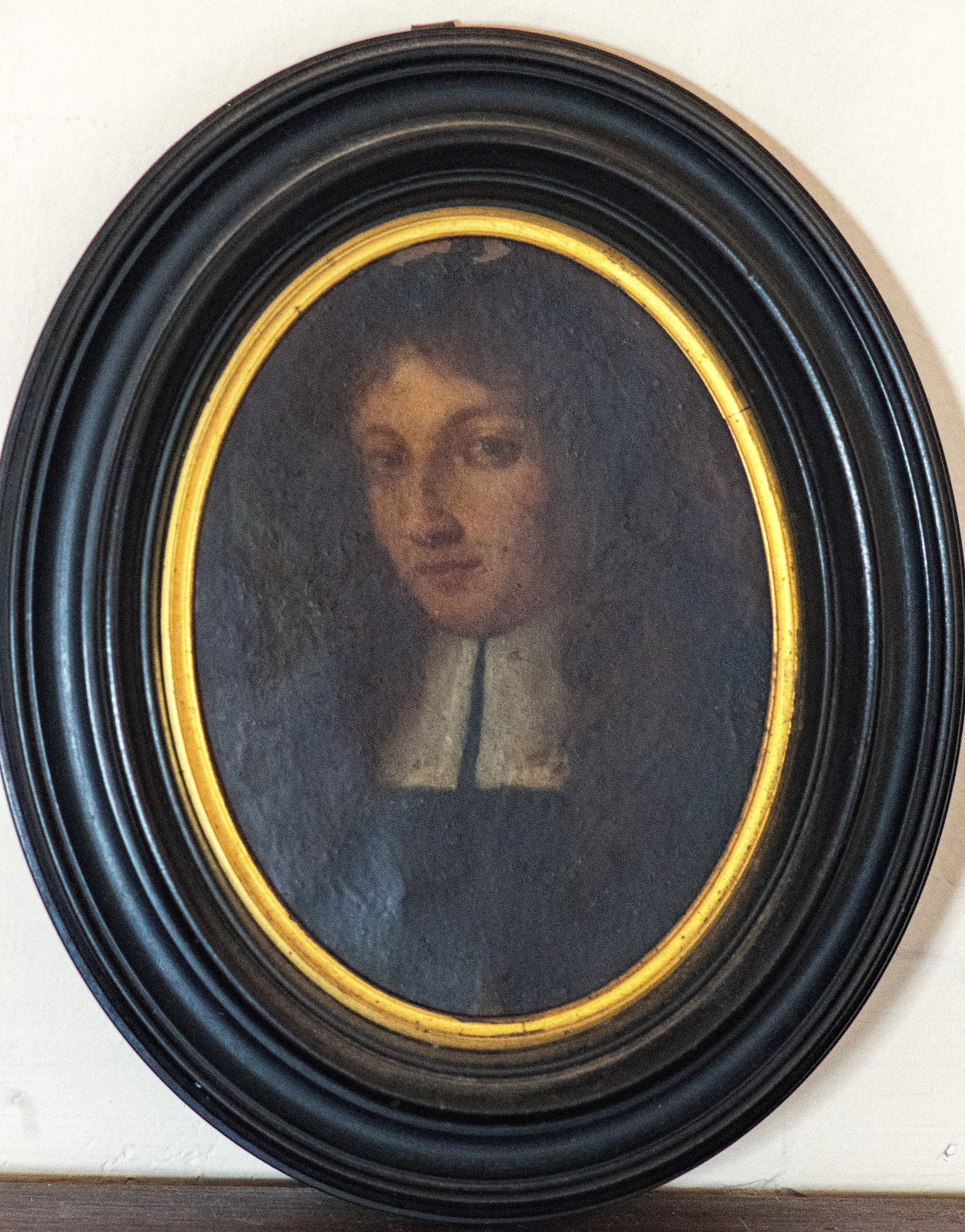
Portrait of Antoine "Le Maistre" (Arnauld), nephew of Antoine Arnauld. Back of copper plate has inscription "A. le Maistre, 1608-1658. Other portraits on this page are actually of Louis-Isaac Le Maistre de Sacy, his brother.

Le Maistre's portrait was painted by Philippe de Champaigne (1602–1674), a painter who was closely connected with Port-Royal des Champs. A copy exists, but the original is lost. The portrait was later engraved by Charles Simonneau. Champaigne also painted Le Maistre's aunts Angélique Arnauld and Catherine Agnès Arnauld and his uncle Robert Arnauld d'Andilly.
