= Simon Arnauld, Marquis de Pomponne =

French diplomat and minister

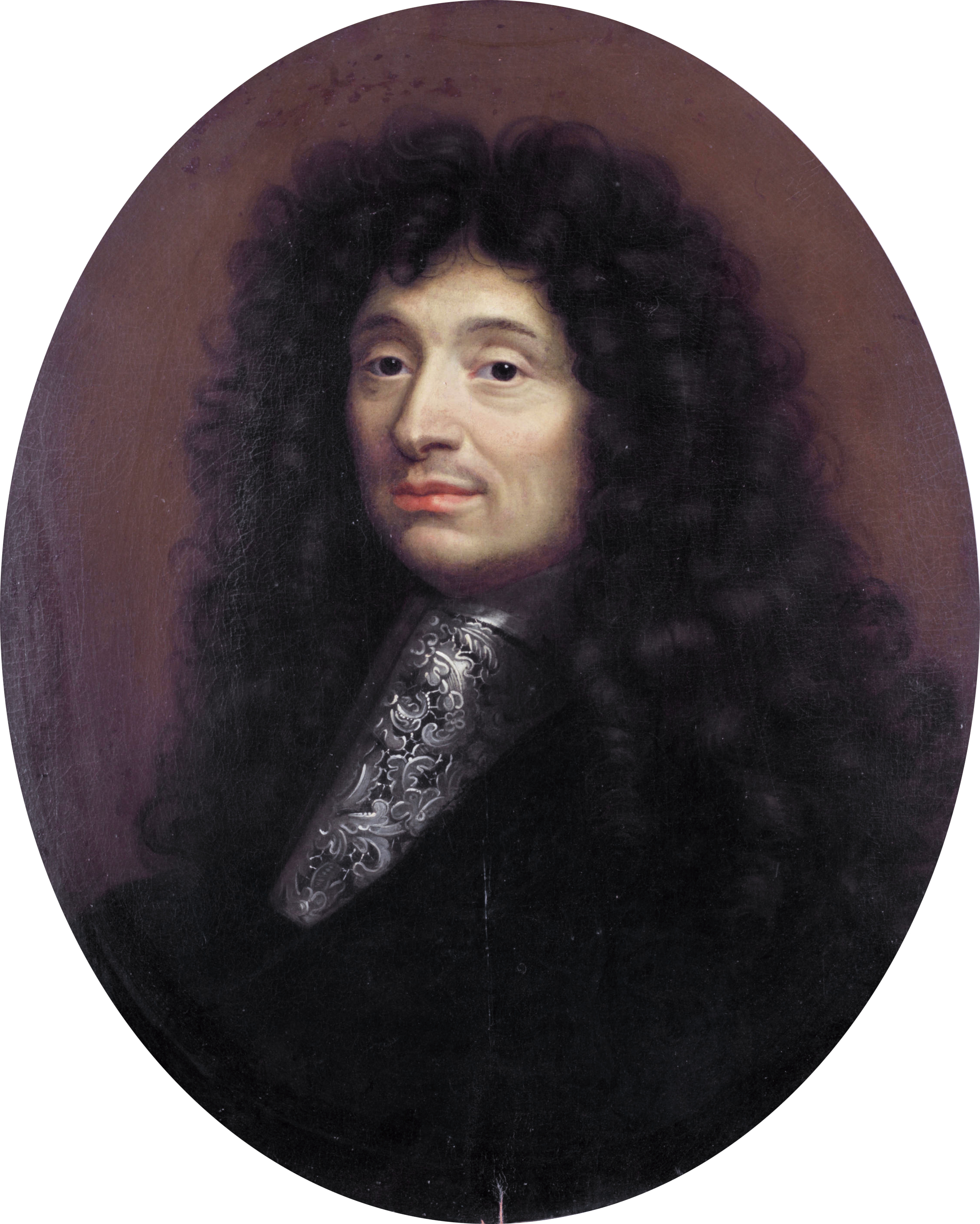
Simon Arnauld, marquis de Pomponne

Simon Arnauld de Pomponne, Seigneur and then Marquis (1682) of Pomponne (November 1618 in Paris – 26 September 1699 in Fontainebleau) was a French diplomat and minister.

== Early life ==
Simon Arnauld was born in Paris in 1618. He was son of Robert Arnauld d'Andilly, governor of Monsieur and "intendant d'armée" under Richelieu, and of Catherine Le Fevre de la Boderie. A member of the famous Jansenist family Arnauld (his siblings were Antoine Arnauld and Angélique de Saint-Jean Arnauld d'Andilly), he was named Simon Arnauld de Briottes until 1643, then Simon Arnauld d'Andilly from 1643 to 1660, and eventually Simon Arnauld de Pomponne, after the estate of Pomponne, which was left to him by his mother, when he got married in 1660.

After being taught by Martin Barcos, he entered the world of the "précieuses", attending the salon of Mme de Rambouillet with several members of his family. He wrote a number of poems for the "Guirlande de Julie", and was a friend of important writers, such as Marie de Rabutin-Chantal, marquise de Sévigné, Marie-Madeleine Pioche de la Vergne, comtesse de la Fayette, and Duke François de La Rochefoucauld.

== Early career ==
He began his career as an intendant of the French garrison in Casale, where he staid from 1642 to 1647. Then, supported by Mazarin and Michel Le Tellier, he was appointed "intendant d'armée" in Italy, in Paris during the Fronde, and in the Principality of Catalonia.

He first acted as a diplomat in 1655, having to negotiate and sign a treaty with the Duke of Mantua, a mission he was to achieve outstandingly. However, as Jansenism began to widespread, his uncle Antoine Arnauld became one of its leaders, and his own father decided to retire in Port-Royal-des-Champs. In 1658, Mazarin thus refused to let him become chancellor of Monsieur, Louis XIV's own brother. Worse, Pomponne turned to be both a client and a friend of Nicolas Fouquet and married one of his cousins, which caused his exiles in Verdun, in eastern France (1662–1664), then to his estate of Pomponne (1664–1665).

== Diplomat ==
Though he was allowed back to Paris by the King only in 1665, his friendships with Michel Le Tellier, Le Pelletier and Hugues de Lionne enabled him to be promoted as ambassador to Sweden. His part was to prevent it from entering the Triple Alliance (1665–1668). Even if Sweden strengthened its links with the United Provinces, Pomponne gave the King complete satisfaction and so was entrusted a new mission, this time in the United Provinces (1668–1671). In 1671, however, he was recalled to Sweden for the delicate mission of forging a new alliance between Sweden and France. Therefore, the United Provinces were isolated on a diplomatic scale and could be attacked by Louis XIV.

After Hugues de Lionne, Secretary of State for Foreign affairs, died in September 1671, Simon Arnauld de Pomponne was brought to the board of which he remained in charge until 1679. His style is one of a real diplomat, trying to find agreements with other countries in wartime, and Louvois, Secretary of State for War, was more aggressive and keen to fight. From 1673 to 1675, when the ardently-Catholic English courtier Edward Colman asked the French Government for large sums of money to persuade King Charles II to pursue a pro-French policy, Pomponne showed his strong common sense by telling his own King firmly that Charles' support was not worth bidding for. While Pomponne managed to obtain the Treaty of Nijmegen (1678), he was eventually dismissed at a time when Louis wanted to conduct a more warlike foreign policy (18 November 1679).

== Later life ==
However, Louis remained favourable to him since his estate of Pomponne became a marquisate in 1682, and his sons were offered a regiment and an important abbey. The King called him back in 1691 (as a member of the Conseil d'en haut but without the charge of a specific board), right after Louvois's death and fostered the marriage of the son of the Secretary of State for Foreign Affairs, the marquis de Torcy, with Pomponne's daughter. Pomponne still played an important role in French policy in the 1690s.

He died in Fontainebleau in 1699.
