= Catherine Arnauld =

French religious figure (1590–1651)

Catherine Arnauld (1590–1651) was a French religious figure of the 17th century, belonging to the Arnauld family of Jansenists. She was the eldest daughter of Antoine Arnauld (1560–1619).

She married Isaac Le Maistre, conseiller du roi (King's Councillor), and they had many children, including Antoine Le Maistre, Simon Le Maistre and Louis-Isaac Lemaistre de Sacy. After her husband's death, she became a nun and retired to Port-Royal.
