= Musée national de Port-Royal des Champs =

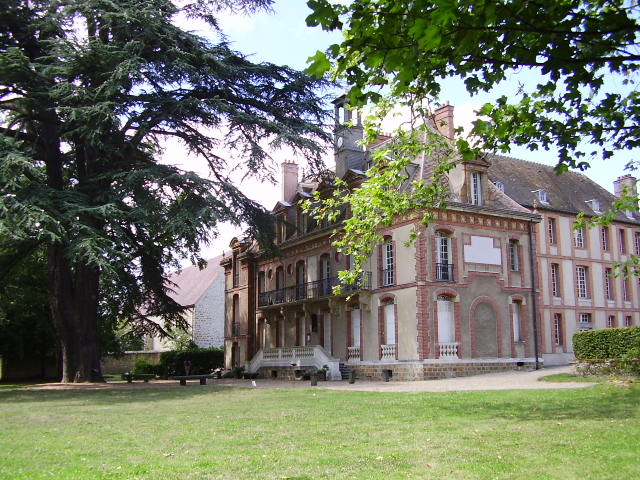
- The Musée national de Port-Royal des Champs
- Established: 1953
- Location: Chemin des Granges 78114 Magny-les-Hameaux
- Coordinates: 48.7480°N 2.0152°E
- Type: Art museum
- Visitors: 20 280 (2007)
- Website: www.port-royal-des-champs.eu

The musée national de Port-Royal des Champs is an art museum situated at the place of the former Port-Royal-des-Champs Abbey in the commune of Magny-les-Hameaux, in Yvelines. The museum features 17th and 18th-century paintings and engravings, including a series that depicts the religious life of the former abbey.

Visitors can also explore the 30-hectare estate which includes the ruins of the abbey and a 13th-century dovecote.

== History ==
In 1952, the State bought the building called Petites écoles and its extension. Since 1953, the museum organization was left in Bernard Dorival's care. The building was inaugurated on June 14, 1962, in the presence of André Malraux.

== See also ==
- Port-Royal-des-Champs Abbey
- List of museums in Paris
