= Agnès Arnauld =

French Cistercian abbess

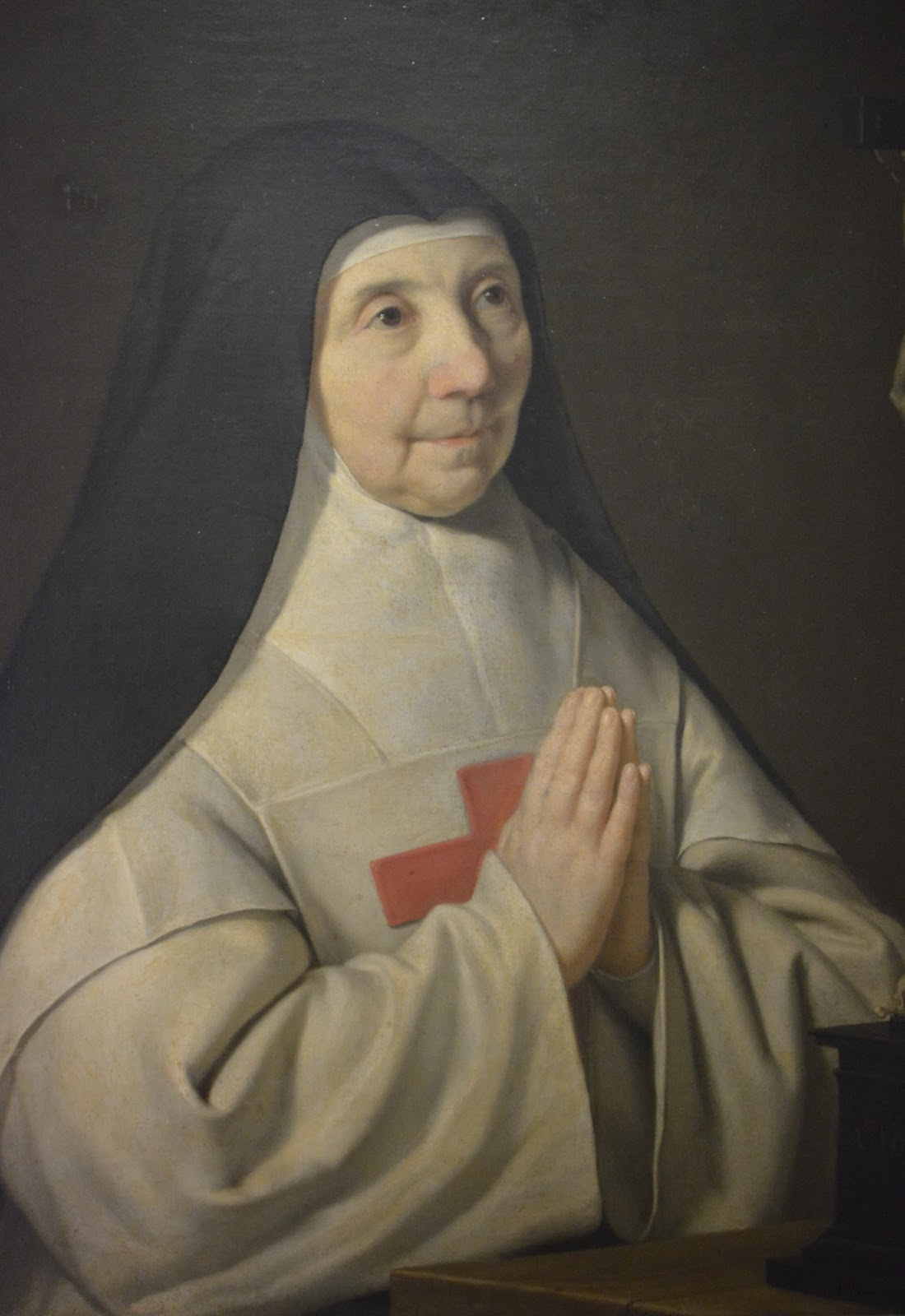
Abbess Catherine-Agnès Arnault by Philippe de Champaigne

Agnès Arnauld, (1593–1672), was a Cistercian nun and the abbess of the Abbey of Port-Royal, near Paris. She was a major figure in French Jansenism.

Arnauld was born Jeanne-Catherine-Agnès Arnauld, a member of the Arnauld family. She was a sister of the priest philosopher Antoine Arnauld, called "le Grand Arnauld" and of Abbess Angélique Arnauld.

Agnès Arnauld succeeded her sister Angélique as head of the abbey in 1630. She led it during the most repressive anti-Jansenist period. She organised the movement against signing the Formulary of Alexander VII and for this was confronted by Hardouin de Péréfixe, the Archbishop of Paris. She was also the author of the Constitutions of Port-Royal, a text which reformed the material and spiritual rule of the abbey in a spirit of Cistercian renewal.

Her niece Angélique de Saint-Jean Arnauld d'Andilly (b. 1624) succeeded her as Abbess.

== Publications ==
Her writings include;

- Private Chaplet of the Blessed Sacrament (1626)
- Constitutions of Port-Royal (1665)
- Image of a Perfect and an Imperfect Nun (1665)
- Spirit of Port-Royal (1665)
- Counsels on the Conduct Which the Nuns Should Maintain in the Event of a Change in the Governance of the Convent (1718)
- Letters of Mère Agnès Arnauld, abbess of Port-Royal (1858)

== Bibliography ==
- Perle Bugnon-Secrétan, Mère Agnès Arnauld. 1593–1672. Abbesse de Port-Royal, Cerf, 1996, p. 272

== See also ==
Amis de Port Royal website (in French)
