= Antoine Arnauld (memoirist) =

French memoirist

Antoine Arnauld (1616–1698) was a French memoirist.

== Biography ==
Eldest son of Robert Arnauld d'Andilly, Antoine Arnauld was born in 1616. His first tutor was Martin de Barcos, the nephew of the Abbot of St. Cyran. He was then sent to the college of Lisieux in order to finish his studies. In his memoirs, he describes himself as a gentle man who could not win the affection of his father, who had high hopes placed upon another of his sons.

During his campaign, he showed courage and composure, however, he wrote in his memoirs that luck was not on his side. In 1643, wanting to serve under one of his uncles, he applied for a patent of aide he thought he deserved it, it was however refused. He submitted to the will of his father, but he was not treated any better. Deprived of his support, he turned to his uncle, Henri Arnauld, abbot of Saint-Nicolas, and he followed him to Rome where the priest was sent in 1645. Shortly after, the abbot of Saint-Nicolas was named bishop of Angers. In 1674, Louis XIV conferred on him the abbey of Chaumes-en-Brie which was to his liking because it was in the vicinity of the properties his family. Upon the disgrace of his brother, he withdrew to the residency of the bishop of Angers, in whom he entrusted the administration. After the death of the bishop, he lived there peacefully until his death in 1698.
