= Magny-les-Hameaux =

- Commune
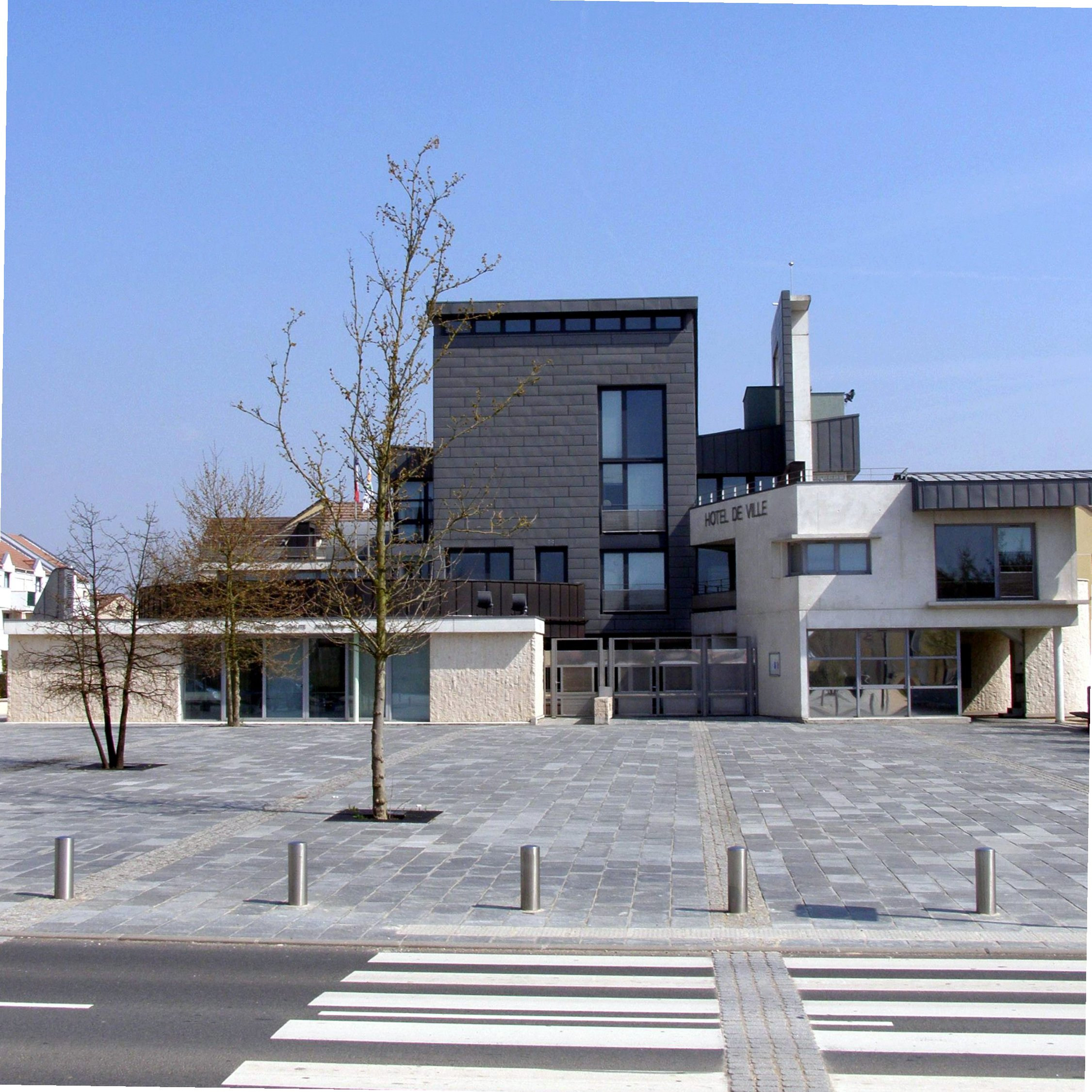
- The town hall in Magny-les-Hameaux

- Coat of arms
- Location of Magny-les-Hameaux
- Location within France Location within Île-de-France (region)
- Coordinates: 48°44′11″N 2°05′16″E
- Country: France
- Region: Île-de-France
- Department: Yvelines
- Arrondissement: Rambouillet
- Canton: Maurepas
- Intercommunality: Saint-Quentin-en-Yvelines

Government
  - Mayor (2020–2026): Bertrand Houillon
- Area^{1}: 16.64 km^{2} (6.42 sq mi)
- Elevation: 160 m (520 ft)
- Highest elevation: 171 m (561 ft)
- Lowest elevation: 105 m (344 ft)
- Population (2023): 9,386
  - Density: 564.1/km^{2} (1,461/sq mi)
- Time zone: UTC+01:00 (CET)
  - Summer (DST): UTC+02:00 (CEST)
- INSEE/Postal code: 78356 /78114
- ^{1} French Land Register data, which excludes lakes, ponds, glaciers > 1 km^{2} (0.386 sq mi or 247 acres) and river estuaries.

Magny-les-Hameaux (French pronunciation: [maɲi le amo]) is a commune in the Yvelines department in the Île-de-France region in north-central France.

== Population ==
Historical population
Year	Pop.	±% p.a.
1968	1,228	—
1975	2,902	+13.07%
1982	7,035	+13.48%
1990	7,800	+1.30%
1999	8,769	+1.31%
2007	8,779	+0.01%
2012	9,061	+0.63%
2017	9,327	+0.58%
2023	9,386	+0.11%
Source: INSEE

== Education ==
There are four preschools: Ecole Francis Jammes, Ecole André Gide, Ecole Petit Prince, and Ecole Jean Baptiste Corot. There are five elementary schools: Ecole Rosa Bonheur, Ecole Albert Samain, Ecole Saint Exupéry, Ecole André Gide, and Ecole Louise Weiss. The school assignments for preschool and elementary are determined by one's residence.

There is one junior high school in the commune, Collège Albert Einstein. Lycée de Villaroy, a senior high school/sixth form college, is in nearby Guyancourt.

Versailles Saint-Quentin-en-Yvelines University provides tertiary educational services.

== See also ==
- Communes of the Yvelines department
- Port-Royal-des-Champs
