= Jean du Vergier de Hauranne =

French theologian (1581–1643)

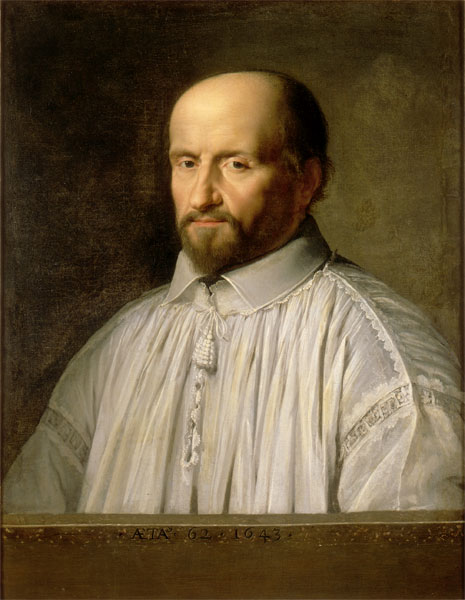
Jean du Vergier de Hauranne, Abbé de Saint-Cyran, in a portrait from 1645 or 1646.

Jean du Vergier de Hauranne, the Abbé (Abbot) of Saint-Cyran (1581 – 6 October 1643), was a French Catholic priest who introduced Jansenism into France.

== Life ==
Born in the city of Bayonne to a family of Gascon and Basque merchants, Vergier studied with the Jesuits of Agen. At the age of sixteen he was sent to study at the Sorbonne, and then took up theology at the Catholic University of Leuven. There he formed a friendship with Cornelius Jansen and, as the wealthier of the two, became Jansen's patron for a number of years, getting Jansen a job as a tutor in 1606. Two years later, he obtained for Jansen a position teaching at the episcopal college back in Bayonne. The duo spent 1611–1614 there, in seclusion in a house belonging to his family, where they studied the Church Fathers together, with a special focus on the thought of Augustine of Hippo, until Jansen left Bayonne in 1614 to return to the Dutch Republic.

In 1617 Vergier left Bayonne at the invitation of Henri-Louis Chasteigner de La Roche-Posay, the Bishop of Poitiers, where he soon became a leading figure of the diocese. He was ordained a priest in 1618. In 1620 he became the commendatory abbot of the Abbey of Saint-Cyran and was thus generally known as the Abbé de Saint-Cyran for the rest of his life. The new commendatory prelate resided little in his abbey. During that same year, he made the acquaintance of the mystic, Charles de Condren, and through him Pierre de Bérulle, founder of the French Oratory, under whose influence, he adopted an Augustinian Christocentrism. He also became friends with Robert Arnauld d'Andilly, through whom he became connected with the Arnauld family.

Vergier kept up his correspondence with Jansen, urging him to prepare his book Augustinus, the source of the Jansenist teachings. He also became spiritual director and confessor of the nuns of the abbey of Port-Royal des Champs, in whose history the Arnauld family played significant roles. Under his leadership from 1633 to 1636 the abbey became a center of Jansenism.

After the death of his friend Bérulle in 1629, Vergier became the leader of a group of devotees, allied with the Parlement of Paris, which brought him into conflict with the French Prime Minister, Cardinal Richelieu. In 1638, Richelieu had him imprisoned at Vincennes, where he remained until after the cardinal's death in 1642. He himself died shortly after in Paris in 1643, having lived long enough to hear of the condemnation of Jansen's teachings by Pope Urban VIII the previous year.

== Works ==
Together with Jansen, Saint-Cyran insisted that love of God was fundamental, and that only contrition, and not simple attrition (imperfect contrition), could save a person. The debate between the respective roles of contrition and attrition was one of the motives of his imprisonment. However, he remained hesitant on this matter, and in prison signed a declaration in favor of attrition.
