= Henri Arnauld =

French Catholic bishop

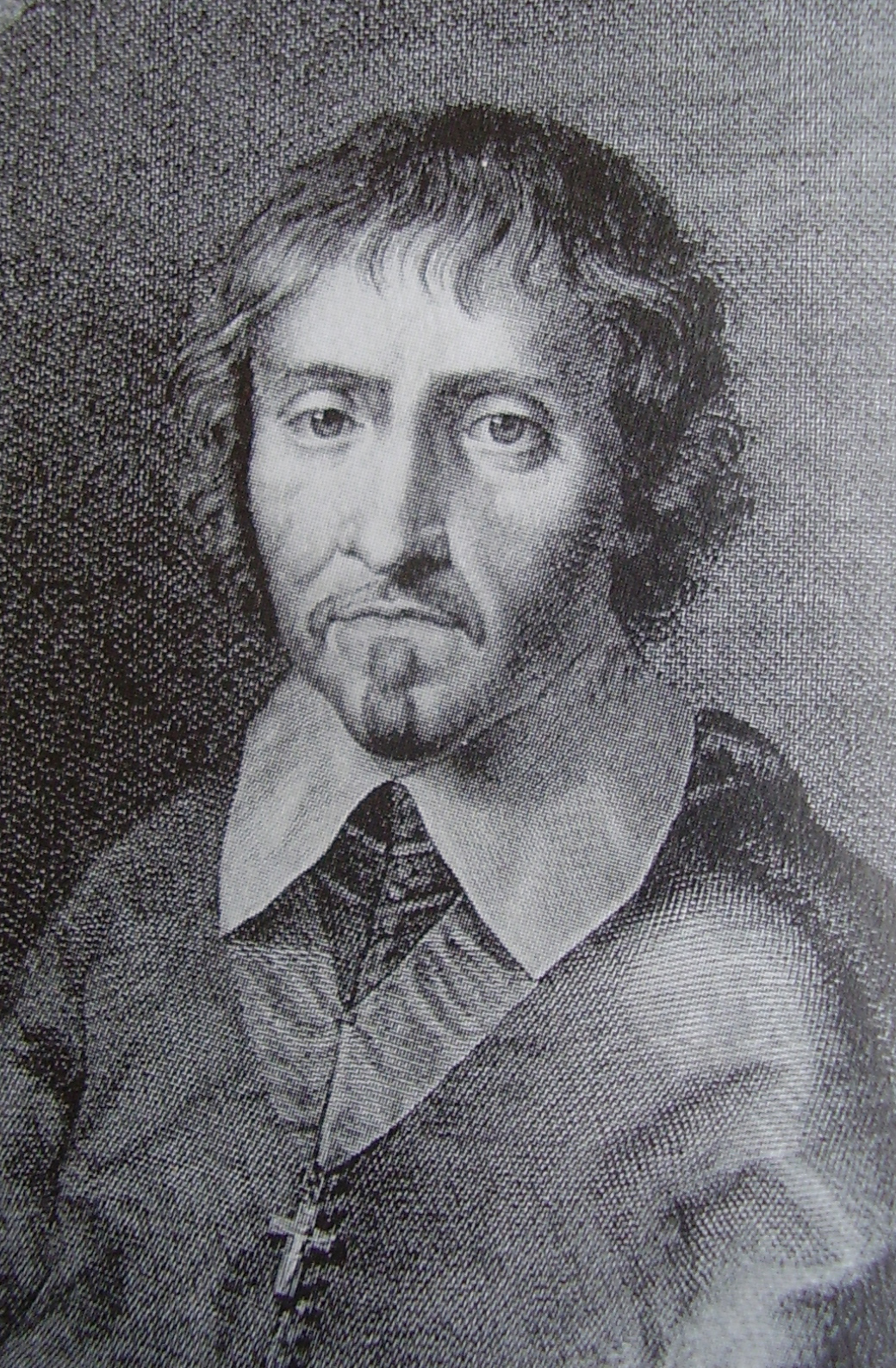
Henri Arnauld

Henri Arnauld (1597–1692) was a French Catholic bishop.

Arnauld was born in Paris, and was first destined for the Bar, but was taken to Rome by Cardinal Bentivoglio and during this absence, which lasted five years, the court granted him (1624) the Abbey of Saint-Nicholas. In 1637 the Chapter of Toul offered him the bishopric of Toul, and the king, at the recommendation of Father Joseph, confirmed the choice. He was obliged to wait three years for his Bulls, which were delayed by the difficulties between the court and the Holy See. He is close to some of the most famous writer of the time (Sébastien Guez de Balzac, François Maynard, etc.) and write poems.

At the time of the quarrel between Pope Innocent X and the Barberini, Arnauld was sent to Rome as chargé d'affaires of France. He acquitted himself of this mission with adroitness. The pope could not deny him the return of the cardinals, who were reinstated in their possessions and dignities. He returned with the reputation of being one of the most politic prelates in the kingdom.

Being offered the Bishopric of Périgueux (1650), he refused, but accepted the see of Angers in which was situated his Abbey of Saint-Nicholas. During his episcopate of forty-two years, he showed extraordinary ability in the service of the Jansenists and of his family. Having once entered on this path, he concentrated all his energies to keep from yielding, and thus to save his own honour and that of his brother Antoine Arnauld. This involved him in many difficulties, and caused many dissensions in his diocese.

His entrance into the quarrel aroused by Jansenism was most exciting. When Louis XIV ordered the bishops to sign the Formulary drawn up by the Assembly of the Clergy in 1661, Arnauld as the Bishop of Angers wrote a letter to the king sustaining the famous distinction of Pierre Nicole between "fact" and "law". The king having shown marked displeasure, the bishop wrote to the pope a letter of the same import, but Pope Alexander VII made no reply. The obstinate Arnauld then wrote to Péréfixe, Archbishop of Paris, to forestall the tempest which the obligation of signing the Formulary would arouse at Port-Royal. At the same time he encouraged the religious to resist or take refuge in subtleties.

Arnauld was one of the four prelates who in 1665 loftily refused to sign the Formulary of Alexander VII, and issued a mandate against it. He was about to be cited before an ecclesiastical tribunal when the pope died. Pope Clement IX, successor to Alexander VII, judged it preferable in the interests of religion to silence the whole affair. He accorded the Clementine peace to this party, and they took advantage of it.

The bishop preserved his Jansenism to the end. He pursued with disfavour the partisans of orthodoxy. One should read the "Mémoires" of Joseph Grandet, third superior of the Seminary of Angers, to know to what a degree Jansenism had imbued the bishop. He was energetic, austere, devoted to his duty, and filled with zeal.

In 1652, when the queen mother was approaching to inflict punishment on the city of Angers, which was in revolt, the bishop appeased her with a word. On giving her Holy Communion, he said: "Receive, Madame, your God, Who pardoned His enemies when dying on the Cross." There is still quoted a saying of his illustrating his love of work. One day, on being requested to take a day each week for relaxation, he replied: "I shall willingly do so, if you give me a day on which I am not bishop." He remains one of the most enigmatical figures of the seventeenth-century episcopate.

The negotiations carried on by him at the Court of Rome and various Italian courts have been published in five volumes (Paris, 1745).
