= Marie Angélique Arnauld =

French Cistercian abbess

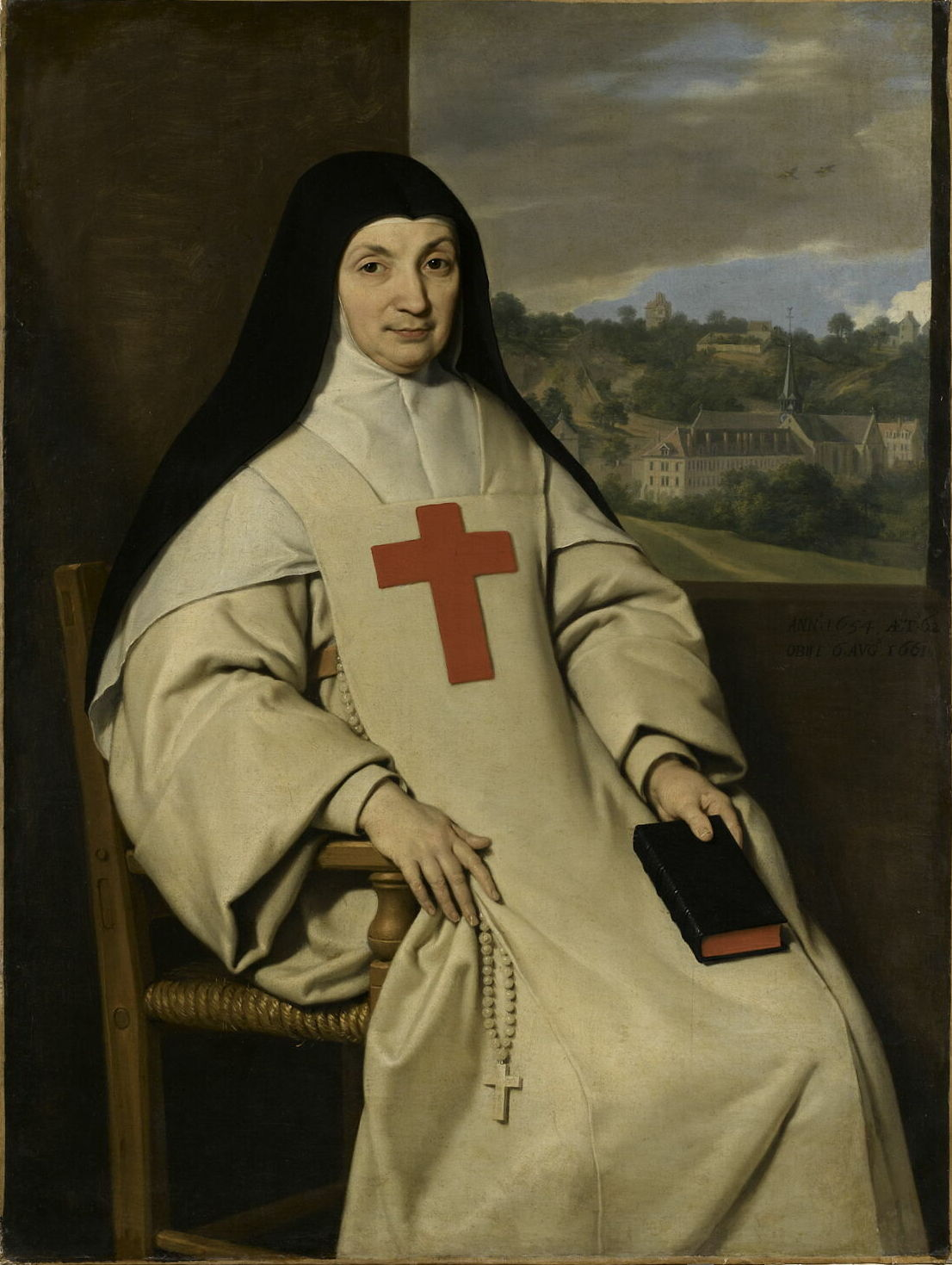

Jacqueline-Marie-Angélique Arnauld, S.O.Cist. or Arnault, called La Mère Angélique (8 September 1591, in Paris – 6 August 1661, in Port-Royal-des-Champs), was abbess of the Abbey of Port-Royal, which became a center of Jansenism under her abbacy.

== Biography ==
Arnauld was the third of the 20 children of the lawyer Antoine Arnauld, and one of six sisters of the philosopher Antoine Arnauld. She was also a sister of Agnès Arnauld. From an early age, her family had determined that she should become not only a nun, but the superior of a convent.

While Arnauld was being raised by Cistercian nuns in the Abbey of Port-Royal-des-Champs, at the prompting of her maternal grandfather, Abbess Jeanne Boulehart selected her as her successor at the age of seven. The family forged her age on the documents forwarded to the Vatican. She was sent to be educated at Maubuisson Abbey, ruled by Angélique d'Estrées, sister of Gabrielle d'Estrées, mistress of Henry IV. On 5 July 1602, months before her 12th birthday, she became coadjutrix to the Abbess of Port-Royal.

She lived a worldly life as a nun, reading popular novels and frequently leaving the monastery for society events. In 1608, a sermon preached by a visiting Capuchin prompted her to effect a reform in her monastery. She was instrumental in the reforms of several other monasteries, transforming them into place of ascetic rigor, with strict monastic enclosures, chapter of faults, silence, fasting, a diet without meat, and prayers beginning at 3:00 a.m. The spirituality practiced there encouraged a life of "abandonment" to God's providence. The picture of human nature was pessimistic, emphasizing sin as ompresence and salvation as a privilege for very few. Mother Angélique was counseled and sustained by Francis de Sales; she wanted to join the group of Visitation nuns close to him, but was not successful.

In 1625, thinking that the valley of Port-Royal was unhealthy for her religious, Mère Angélique established them all in Paris, in the Faubourg Saint-Jacques. In 1635, Arnauld came under the influence of Jean du Vergier de Hauranne, the Abbé of Saint-Cyran, one of the promoters of a school of theology which the Jesuits called Jansenism. She continually wrote letters encouraging some and condemning others, among the latter including even Vincent de Paul. During the 17th-century formulary controversy and the persecution of Port-Royal (1648–1652), she was forced to sign a document condemning the five propositions of Jansenism.

She stepped down as abbess in 1630. She was succeeded by her sister Agnès. Supporters persuaded Angélique to write an autobiography, which was mostly the story of her community's resistance in the face of religious tribulations. It was of Mère Agnès and her religious that De Péréfixe, Archbishop of Paris, said: "These sisters are as pure as angels, but as proud as devils".

== Portrayals in plays and fiction ==
Henry de Montherlant's play told the story of the nuns of Port-Royal.
