= Robert Arnauld d'Andilly =

French conseiller d'État and writer (1589–1674)

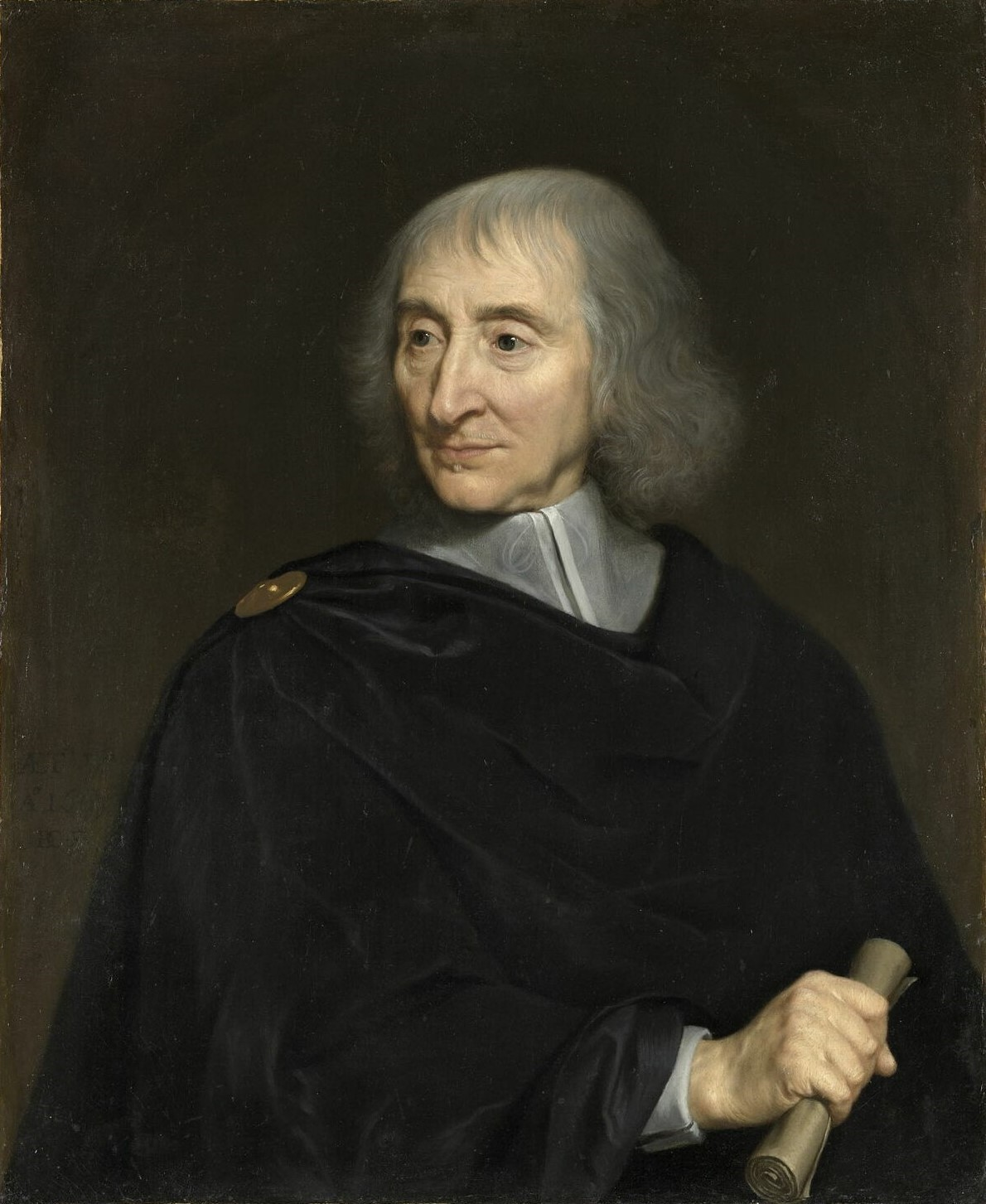
Robert Arnauld d’Andilly, by Philippe de Champaigne (Louvre)

Robert Arnauld d’Andilly (28 May 1589 – 27 September 1674, abbaye de Port-Royal-des-Champs) was a French conseiller d’État, specialising in financial questions, in the court of Marie de' Medici. By the elegance of his language, he was among the major poets, writers and translators of 17th century French classicism. A fervent Catholic, he played an important role in the history of Jansenism and was one of the Solitaires of Port-Royal-des-Champs. He was also renowned for his part in the development of the pruning of fruit trees, to which he was devoted.

== Youth (1589–1613) ==
Robert Arnauld was born in Paris, the eldest of the twenty children of lawyer Antoine Arnauld, procurator-general of Catherine de Médicis, and his wife Catherine Marion. He was a member of a notable family, whose members included Jacqueline (the future Mother Angélique), Henri, who would be bishop of Angers, and the Sorbonne academic Antoine, called "le grand Arnauld".

=== The "Journée du Guichet" ===
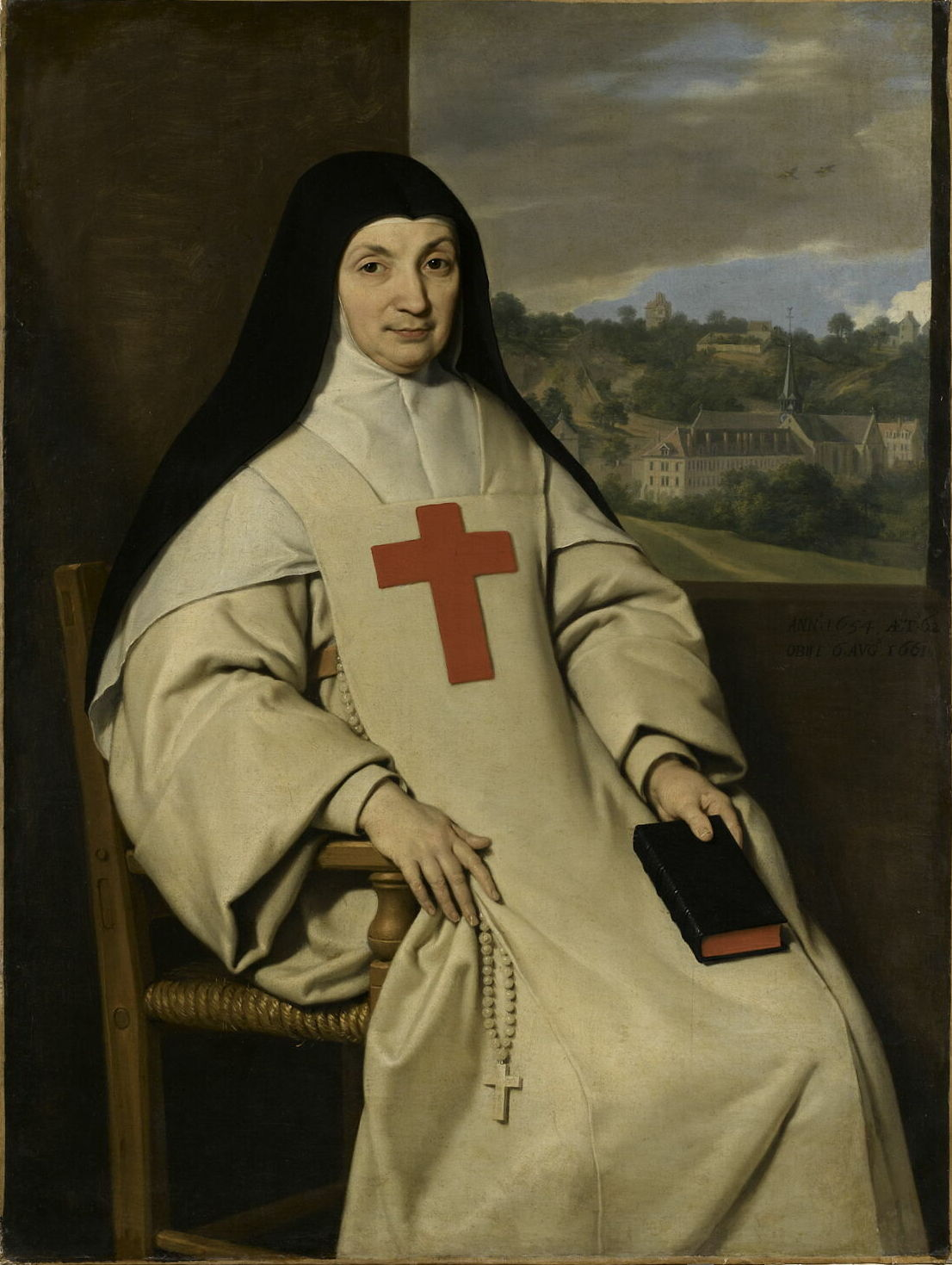
La mère Angélique Arnauld. Portrait of Philippe de Champaigne

=== Entry into the conseil d'Etat ===
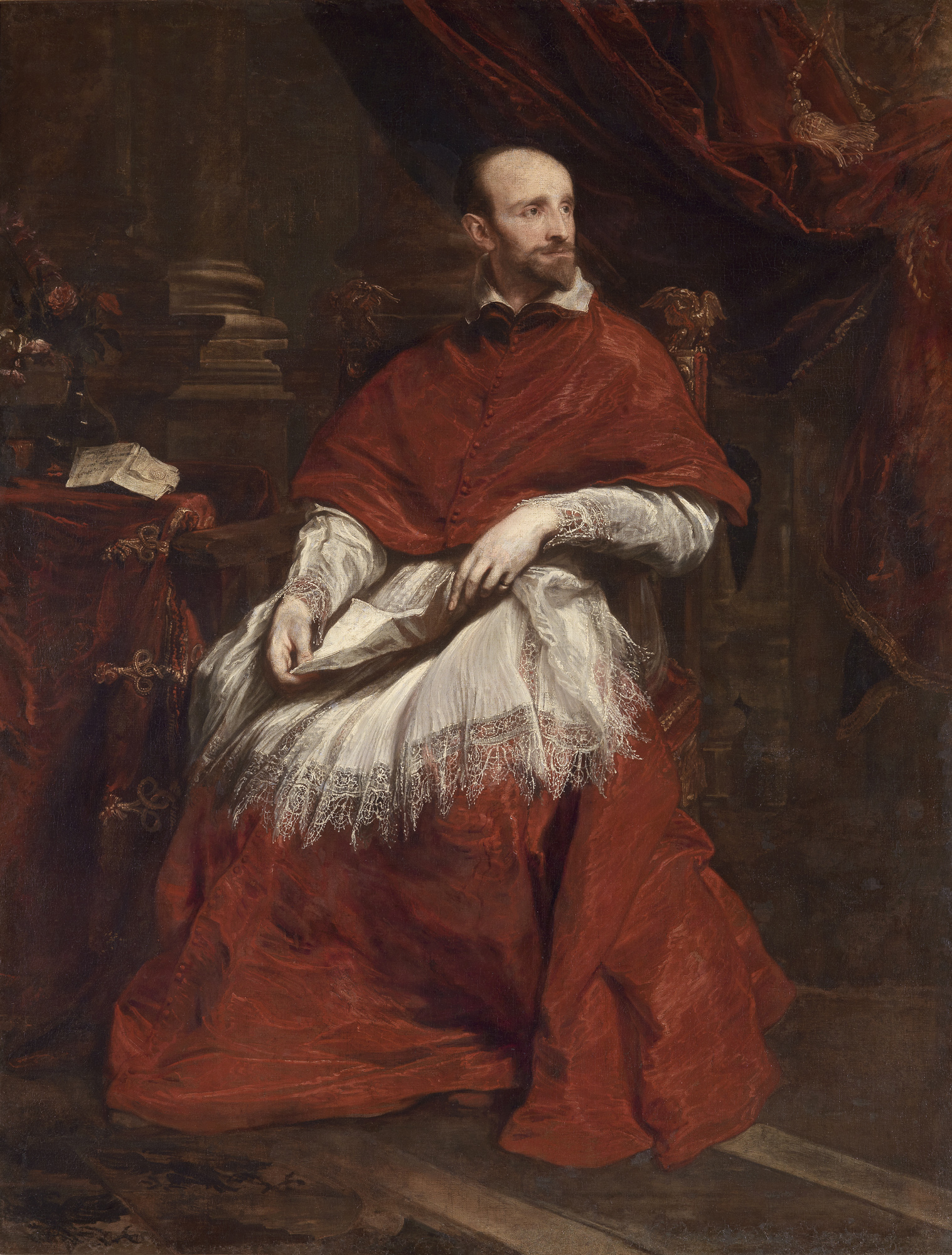
Nuncio Guido Bentivoglio, later Cardinal, by Van Dyck. Oil on canvas, now in the Palazzo Pitti

== First retirement and return (1626–1644) ==
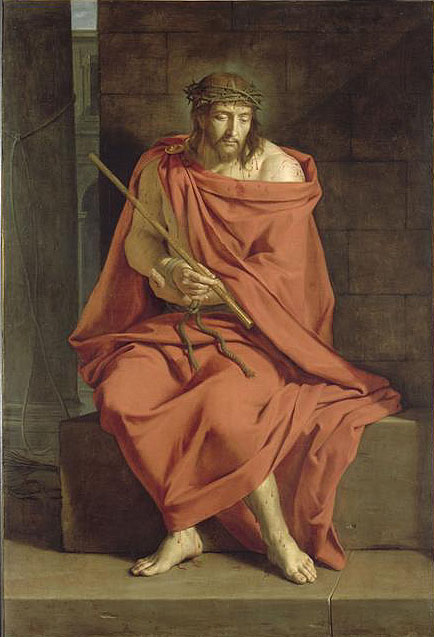
Ecce Homo, by Philippe de Champaigne. Oil on canvas.

== Solitaire (1644–1653) ==
=== Specialist in fruit trees ===
n 1652, a book titled “La manière de cultiver les arbres fruitiers” was published, published under the name of Antoine Legendre, parish priest of Hénouville. Although this person actually existed, the work has been attributed to several writers (the Abbé de Pont-Château, Guillaume de Lamoignon, Olivier Le Fèvre d'Ormesson). Very quickly, the name Robert Arnauld d’Andilly began to circulate; this identification was first proposed in 1716.

== The last battles (1653–1673) ==
=== Condemnation of Jansenism ===
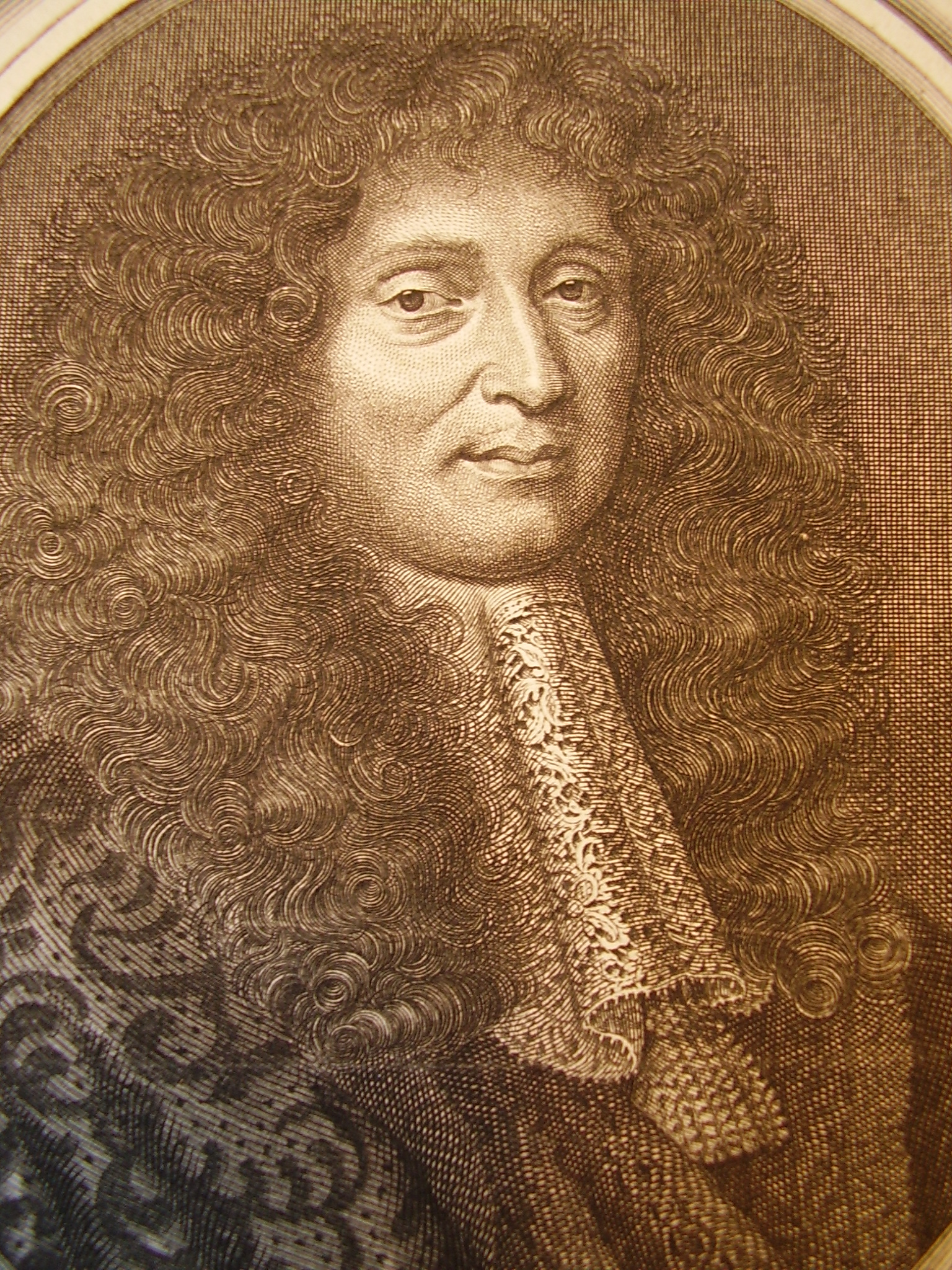
Simon Arnauld de Pomponne (1618–1699), son of Robert Arnauld d'Andilly. portrait by Nicolas de Larmessin (between 1672 and 1679).

== Works ==
=== In French ===
- Stances pour Jésus-Christ, Paris, E. Martin, 1628.
- Poème sur la vie de Jésus-Christ, Paris, Jean Camusat, 1634
- Stances sur diverses vérités chrétiennes, Paris, Veuve Jean Camusat, 1642.
- Traduction d'un discours de la réformation de l'homme intérieur. Ou sont establis les veritables fondemens des vertus chrestiennes... prononcé par Cornelius Janssenius,... [traduction du Latin par Arnauld d'Andilly], Paris, Vve J. Camusat, 1642, 99-vi p., in-12 (en ligne sur Gallica).
- Oeuvres chrétiennes, Paris, Veuve Jean Camusat et Pierre Le Petit, 1644.
- Les Confessions de St Augustin, traduites en français par M. Arnauld d'Andilly, Paris, Vve J. Camusat & P. Le Petit, 1649, in-8° (lire en ligne l'édition de Bruxelles, 1773).
- Advis d'Estat à la Reyne, sur le gouvernement de sa regence, [signé à la fin : Le Solitaire. Du Desert, le 1. fevrier 1649], s.l.s.n., 1649, 30 p. in-4°.
- La manière de cultiver les arbres fruitiers. Par le Sieur Le Gendre, curé d'Henonville. Où il est traité des pepinieres, des espaliers, des contr'espaliers, des arbres en buisson, & à haute tige, Paris, Nicolas Le Gras, 1652, xxviii-282-ii p. in-12 (réédition : Réunion des musées nationaux, 1993).
- Les vies des Saints Pères des déserts et de quelques Saintes, escrites par des Pères de l'Eglise et autres anciens auteurs ecclésiastiques Grecs et Latins, traduites en François par M. Arnauld d'Andilly, Paris, Pierre le Petit & Antoine Vitré, 1653, 2 vol. in-4°.
- L'Echelle sainte, ou les degrés pour monter au Ciel, composés par S. Jean Climaque, et traduit du grec en Français par Arnauld d'Andilly, Paris, Pierre le Petit, 1654, in-12.
- Les sept méditations de S. Therèse sur le Pater. Dix-sept autres méditations qu'elle a écrites après ses communions. Avec ses avis, ou sentences chrétiennes... Traduites de nouveau en françois (par Arnauld d'Andilly). Et imprimez en suite en espagnol, Paris, Le Petit, 1660, 1 vol., in-16°.
- Vies de plusieurs Saints illustres de divers siècles, choisies et trad. par Arnaud d'Andilly, Paris, P. le Petit, 1665, 2 vol. in-8°.
- Histoire des Juifs, écrite par Flavius Joseph sous le titre d'Antiquités judaïques, traduite par Arnauld d'Andilly, Paris, Pierre Le Petit, 1667, xvi-772 p.
- Histoire de la Guerre des Juifs contre les Romains, Response a Appion, Martyre des Machabées par Flavius Ioseph et sa Vie écrite par luy-même avec ce que Philon a escrit de son Ambassade vers l'Empereur Caius Caligula. Traduite du grec par Monsieur Arnauld d’Andilly. Paris: Pierre Le Petit, 1668.
- Thérèse d'Avila, Vie. Fondations faites par sainte Thérèse de plusieurs monastères / de la traduction de M. Arnauld d'Andilly..., Paris, P. Le Petit, 1670, (en ligne sur Gallica).
- Traité du chemin de perfection écrit par sainte Terèse, et quelques petits traitez de la mesme Sainte, savoir : Méditations sur le Pater noster, Méditations après la communion, Advis à ses religieuses. Traduit par M. Arnauld d'Andilly, Paris, P. Le Petit, 1670 (en ligne sur Gallica).
- Saint Eucher, S. Eucher du mépris du monde. De la traduction de M. Arnauld d'Andilly, Paris, P. Le Petit, 1672, 83 p., in-12° (en ligne sur Gallica).
- Instructions chrétiennes tirées des lettres de l'abbé de St Cyran, Paris, s.n., 1672, in-8°.
- Les Œuvres du bienheureux Jean d'Avila docteur et prédicateur espagnol surnommé l'Apostre de l'Andalousie. trad. de M. Arnaud d'Andilly, Paris, Pierre Le Petit, 1673, 2 vol. in-f°, 510–761 pp.
- Oeuvres diverses, Paris, Pierre Le Petit, 1675, 3 vol.
- Histoire de l'ancien Testament tirée de l'écriture sainte, Paris, Le Petit, 1675.
- Lettres de monsieur Arnauld d’Andilly, Paris, Charles Osmont, 1680.
- Mémoires de Messire Robert Arnauld d'Andilly, écrits par lui-même, édités par Claude-Pierre Goujet, Hambourg, A. Vandenhoeck, 1734. Voir également : Mémoires (1610–1656), Collection des mémoires relatifs à l'histoire de France : depuis l'avènement de Henri IV jusqu'à la paix de Paris, vol. 33, Paris, Foucault, 1824, 417 p., in-8° (Tome I et Tome II en ligne sur Gallica).

=== In Latin ===
- Historia et concordia evangelica. Opera & studio theologi parisiensis, Paris, Charles Savreux, 1653, xxvi, 445 p., in-12. Frontispice d'Eustache Le Sueur gravé par Robert Nanteuil.
- Arnauld d'Andilly, poematia varia gallica, latinis versibus reddita, a Petro Bastidaeo Tausiano. Cujus et alia quoque opera singulari studio collegit et adjunxit J. T. de Lupée du Garrané, [Toulouse], veuve Arnaud Colomiez, 1667, 335 p., in-12.

=== Correspondence ===
- Philippe-Emmanuel de Monmerqué, Mémoires de M. de Coulanges, suivis de lettres inédites de madame de Sévigné, de son fils, de l'abbé de Coulanges, d'Arnauld d'Andilly, d'Arnauld de Pomponne, de Jean de la Fontaine et d'autres personnages du même siècle, Paris, J.-J. Blaise, 1820, 512 p. (lire en ligne).

== See also ==
- Guirlande de Julie
