= Port-Royal-des-Champs =

Abbey in Yvelines, France

Coordinates: 48°44′39″N 2°0′58″E

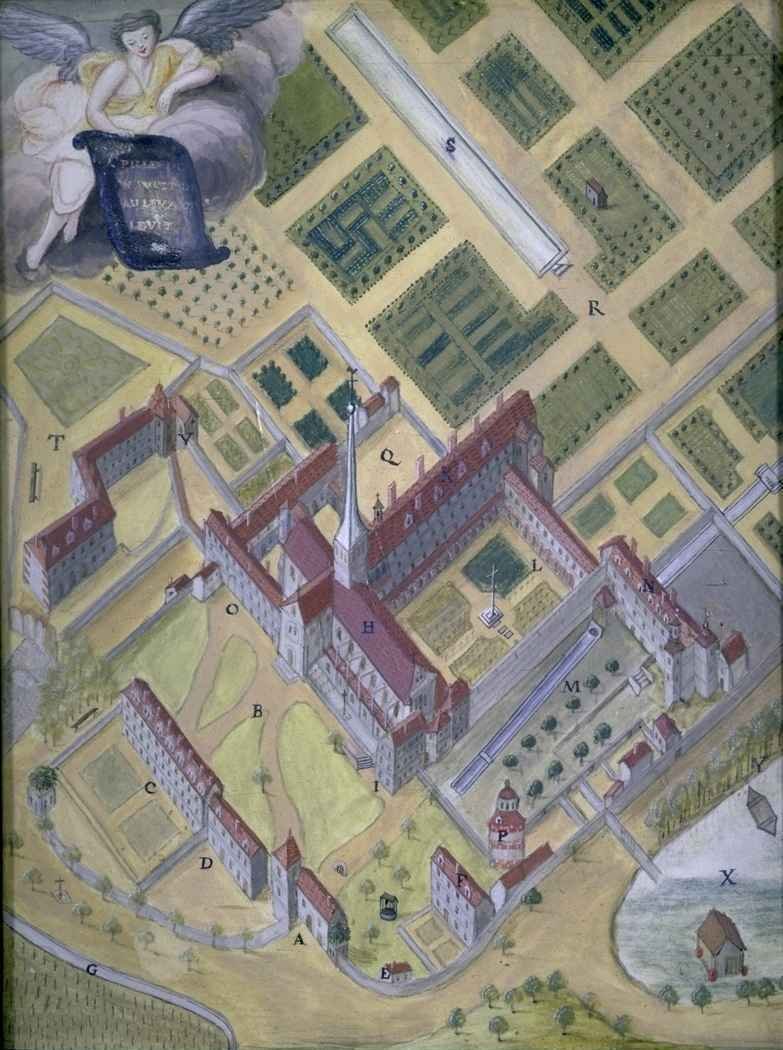
Plan of Port-Royal-des-Champs, after an engraving by Louise-Magdeleine Horthemels, c. 1710

Port-Royal-des-Champs (French pronunciation: [pɔʁ ʁwajal de ʃɑ̃]) was an abbey of Cistercian nuns in Magny-les-Hameaux, in the Vallée de Chevreuse southwest of Paris that launched a number of culturally important institutions.

== History ==
The abbey was established in 1204, but became famous when its discipline was reformed in 1609 by its abbess, Mother Marie Angelique Arnauld (1591–1661). The Arnauld family became its patrons and the abbey's subsequent history was directed by a number of the members of that family. In 1625 most of the nuns moved to a new Port-Royal in Paris, which subsequently became Port-Royal de Paris (or, more commonly, Port-Royal) while the older one was known as Port-Royal des Champs ("Port-Royal of the fields").

At the original site, several schools were founded, which became known as the Petites écoles de Port-Royal ("Little Schools of Port-Royal"). These schools became famous for the high quality of the education they gave. Playwright Jean Racine was educated at Port-Royal. In 1634 Jean du Vergier de Hauranne, Abbé de Saint-Cyran, became spiritual director of the abbey; he was a companion of Jansenius and the implementer of Jansenism in France. From that point forward, the abbeys and schools of Port-Royal became intimately associated with that school of theology.

La logique, ou l'art de penser, the Logique de Port-Royal, was an important textbook on logic first published anonymously in 1662 by Antoine Arnauld and Pierre Nicole, two prominent members of the Jansenist movement; Blaise Pascal likely contributed considerable portions of the text. As it was written in the vernacular, it became quite popular and was in use, as an exemplar of traditional term logic, into the twentieth century, introducing the reader to logic, and exhibiting strong Cartesian elements in its metaphysics and epistemology (Arnauld having been one of the main philosophers whose objections were published, with replies, in Descartes' Meditations on First Philosophy).

The atmosphere of serious study and Jansenist piety attracted a number of prominent cultural figures to the movement, including mathematician and physicist Blaise Pascal. Pascal defended the schools publicly against the Jesuits in the Jansenist controversies which agitated the French Roman Catholic Church, in his Lettres provinciales in 1657. Perhaps even more striking, several important persons of the court were close to Jansenism, such as the Duke of Luynes or the Duke of Liancourt. Members of the Arnauld family had managed to receive important jobs such as Simon Arnauld de Pomponne, Minister of Louis XIV. The Jesuits, on the other hand, enjoyed predominance in political and theological power in France and Europe, providing a personal confessor to the King, etc.

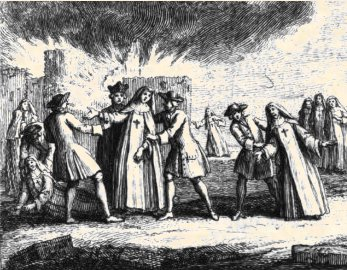
Nuns being forcibly removed from the abbey in 1709.

As a result of the Jesuit attacks on Jansenism, the schools of Port-Royal were regarded as tainted with heresy. Louis XIV wanting peace in the church, the elementary schools were forcibly closed by papal bull in 1660, following the formulary controversy. In 1661, the monastery was forbidden to accept novices, heralding its eventual dissolution. The abbey itself was abolished by a bull from Pope Clement XI in 1708, the remaining nuns forcibly removed in 1709, most of the buildings themselves razed in 1711. The chapel, containing Mère Angélique's tomb, as well as some buildings, still exist in the vast grounds of what eventually became Paris' leading maternity hospital, known as Port-Royal Hospital.

A celebrated history of Port-Royal and its influence was written by Charles Augustin Sainte-Beuve in 1837-1859.

== Museums ==
The remains of the monastery of Port-Royal-des-Champs may still be seen at Magny-les-Hameaux, in the Chevreuse valley. Operated as Musée de Port-Royal, the 30-hectare estate includes the ruins of the abbey and its outbuildings. A 17th-century building houses the Musée national de Port-Royal des Champs, which exhibits 17th and 18th-century paintings and engravings.

== Gallery ==
Abbey of Port-Royal des Champs, by Louise-Magdeleine Horthemels, c. 1709

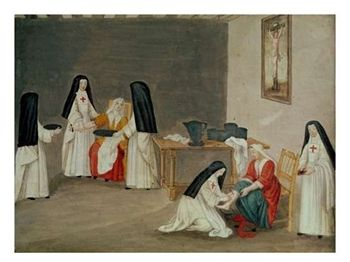
Caring for the Sick

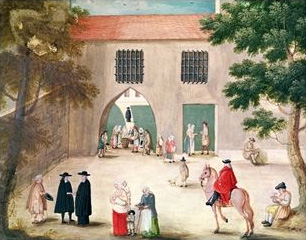
Distributing Alms to the Poor

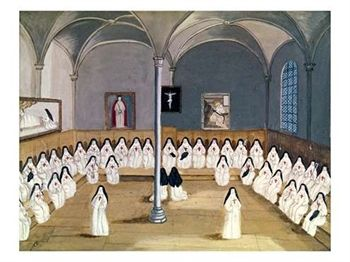
The Sisters of the Abbey

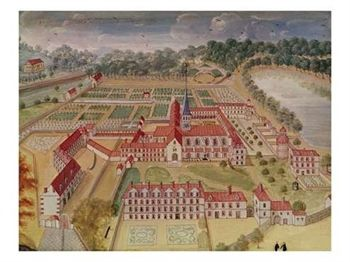
General View

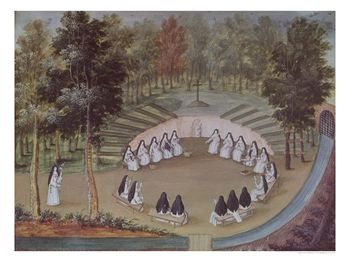
Nuns Meeting in Solitude

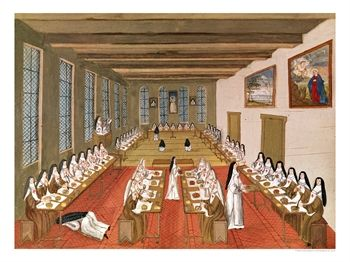
View of the Refectory

== Persons connected to Port-Royal ==
- Antoine Arnauld
- Antoine Le Maistre
- Marie Angelique Arnauld
- Blaise Pascal
- Jacqueline Pascal, sister of Blaise Pascal
- Marc-Antoine Charpentier

== See also ==
- Port-Royal Logic
- Formulary controversy
- Port-Royal Grammar
