= Jean-Marie Henriau =

French cleric and opponent of Jansenism

Jean-Marie Henriau (c.1661, Paris – 25 January 1738) was a French cleric and opponent of Jansenism.

The son of a procureur to the parliament of Paris, he became conseiller-clerc to the parliament, then prior of Beaurain and canon and grand-vicar of Lisieux. He was also abbot of Valloires Abbey.

He was made bishop of Boulogne in 1724 and immediately raised the interdict and set up a tribunal for penitence, chaired and run by the Capucins and Minims of Boulogne-Sur-Mer and Calais as well as the four Recollets convents shut down by his Jansenist predecessor Pierre de Langle. Also in 1724, Henriau ordered that the papal bull Unigenitus be accepted on pain of excommunication and banned reading or ownership of Pasquier Quesnel's book in his diocese. Eight members of his cathedral chapter were unable to accept this order. Henriau interdicted the parish priest of Saint-Martin and the director of Calais' hospitallers, who did not wish to publish this command.

== Sources ==
- Eugène Van Drival, Histoire des évêques de Boulogne, Boulogne-sur-Mer, 1852.
- Catholic Hierarchy website, Bishop Henriau
