= Agostino Cornacchini =

Italian artist (1686–1754)

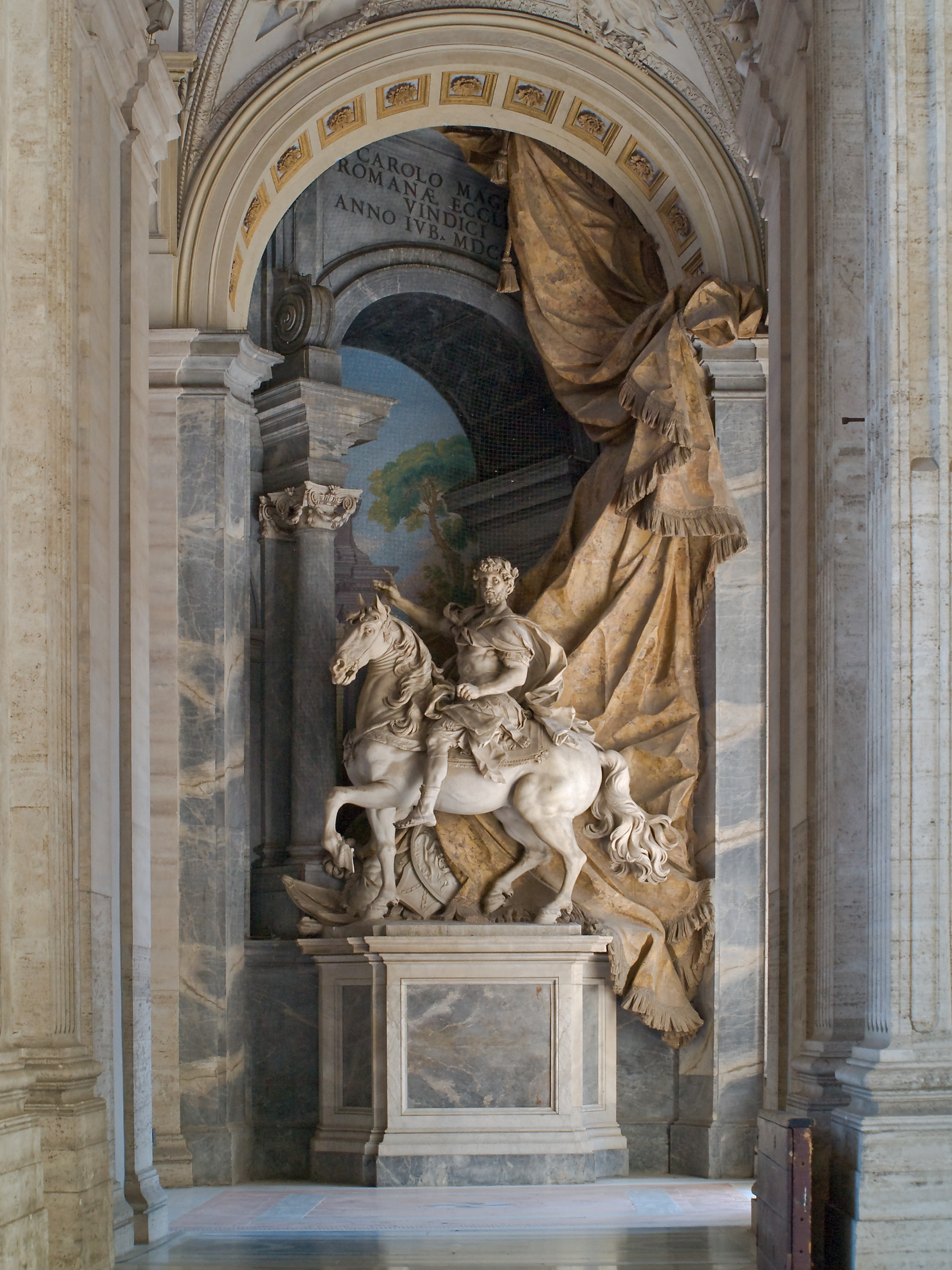
Equestrian statue of Charlemagne by Agostino Cornacchini (1725), St. Peter's Basilica, Vatican, Italy.

Agostino Cornacchini (27 August 1686–1754) was an Italian sculptor and painter of the Rococo period, active mainly in Rome. His masterpiece is the equestrian statue of Charlemagne.

== Biography ==
=== Early career ===
He was born in Pescia and died in Rome. In 1712, Cornacchini established himself in the household of his uncle, Cardinal Carlo Agostino Fabroni, who until 1720 provided Cornacchini with a studio, lodgings and an income. During his period in Fabroni's household Cornacchini executed two marble groups for the Cardinal: an Adoration of the Shepherds and a Deposition (both Pistoia, Biblioteca Fabroniana).

=== Equestrian statue of Charlemagne ===
His career reached a peak in the early 1720s with the commission for the colossal marble equestrian statue of Charlemagne (1720–25) at the base of the Scala Regia on the entrance to the Apostolic Palace, which sits opposite Bernini's Vision of Constantine. The Charlemagne, in a stunning perspectival setting of stucco decoration and mosaic scenery, is both Baroque and Rococo. Its combination of exuberance and intimacy is typical of early 18th-century sculpture in Rome. The asymmetry and misdirection of the line of sight by which the work must be approached call attention to its decorative qualities: the crinkled patterns in Charlemagne's cape, the drill holes in his beard and hair and the way the hair on the horse's mane and tail curls back on itself, like a volute.

=== Later career ===
During the 1720s, among other works, Cornacchini completed a marble statuary group of Hope (1721–4) for the chapel of the Monte di Pietà in Rome, as well as a marble putto holding a holy water stoup (1724–5) and a marble statue of Elijah (1725–7), both for St. Peter's. He sent a number of works abroad, among them a marble statue of St. Francis de Regis for the church of the Descalzas Reales in Madrid. He also shared in the major Roman projects of the 1730s, most notably Pope Clement XII’s Corsini family chapel in San Giovanni in Laterano; Cornacchini's contribution was the life-size marble group of Prudence with Two Putti and a marble relief of the Battle of Anghiari.

In 1734 he was given an honorarium of 50 scudi for a model of angels. By 1737 he had finished a seated marble statue of Clement XII (Ancona, Piazza del Plebiscito), after which no further work is known until 1754, when he received payment for a travertine statue of St. Ursula for the top of the colonnade outside St. Peter's. In addition to his work as a sculptor and draughtsman, he is known to have executed at least one painting in coloured wax on slate (London, Victoria and Albert Museum).

== Gallery ==
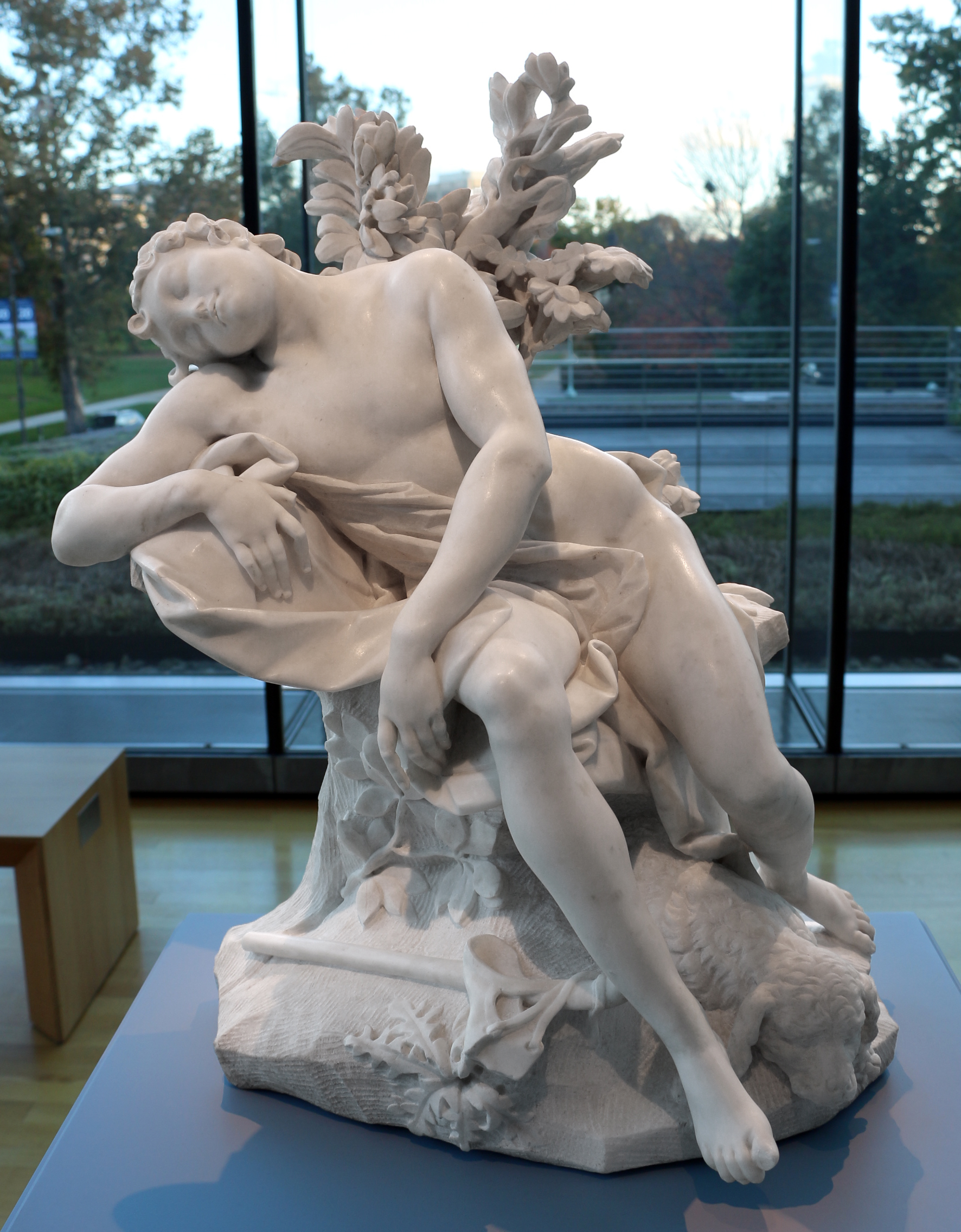
Sleeping Endymion, 1716, Cleveland Museum of Art

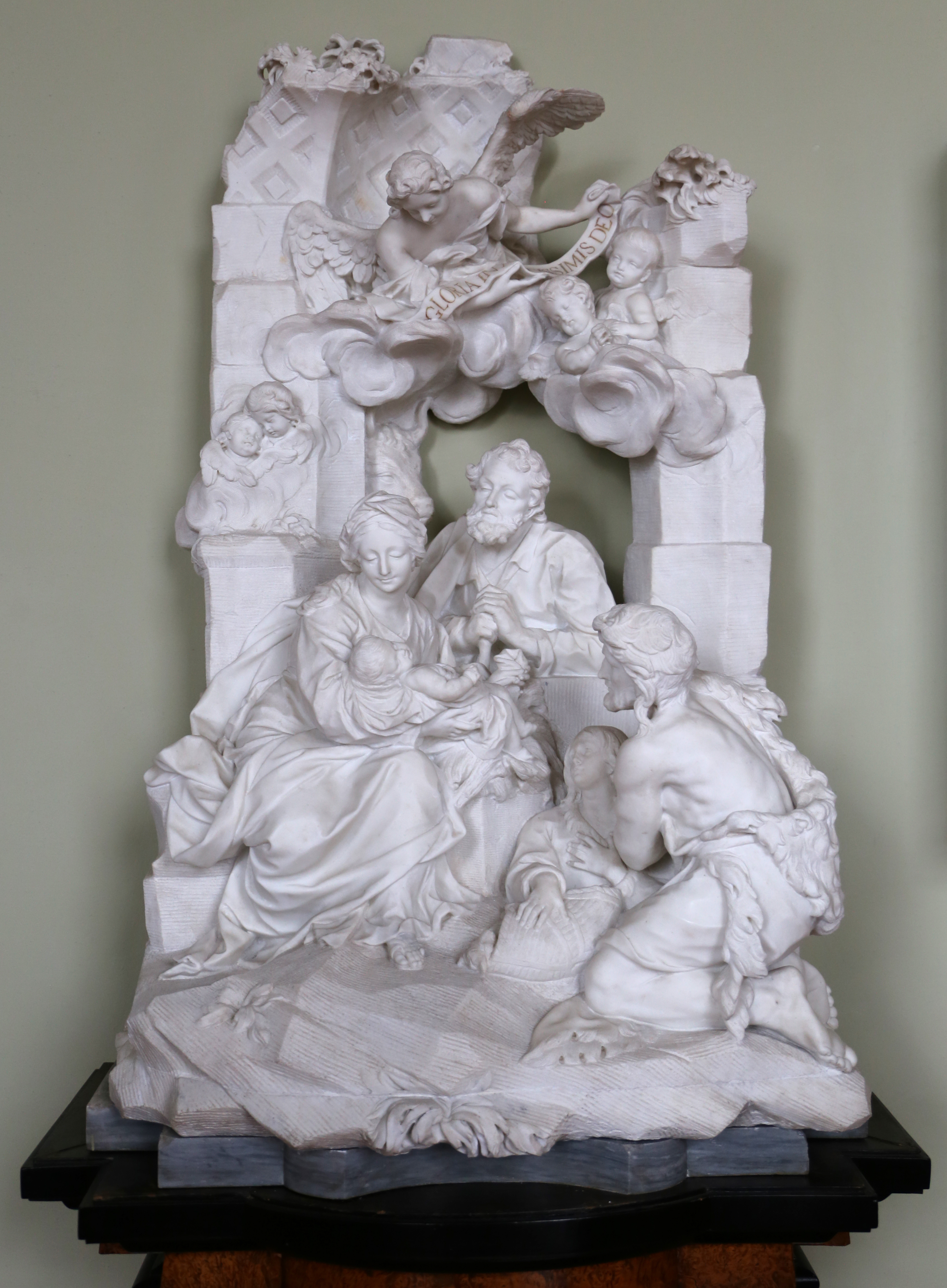
Nativity, 1712–20, Biblioteca Fabroniana, Pistoia

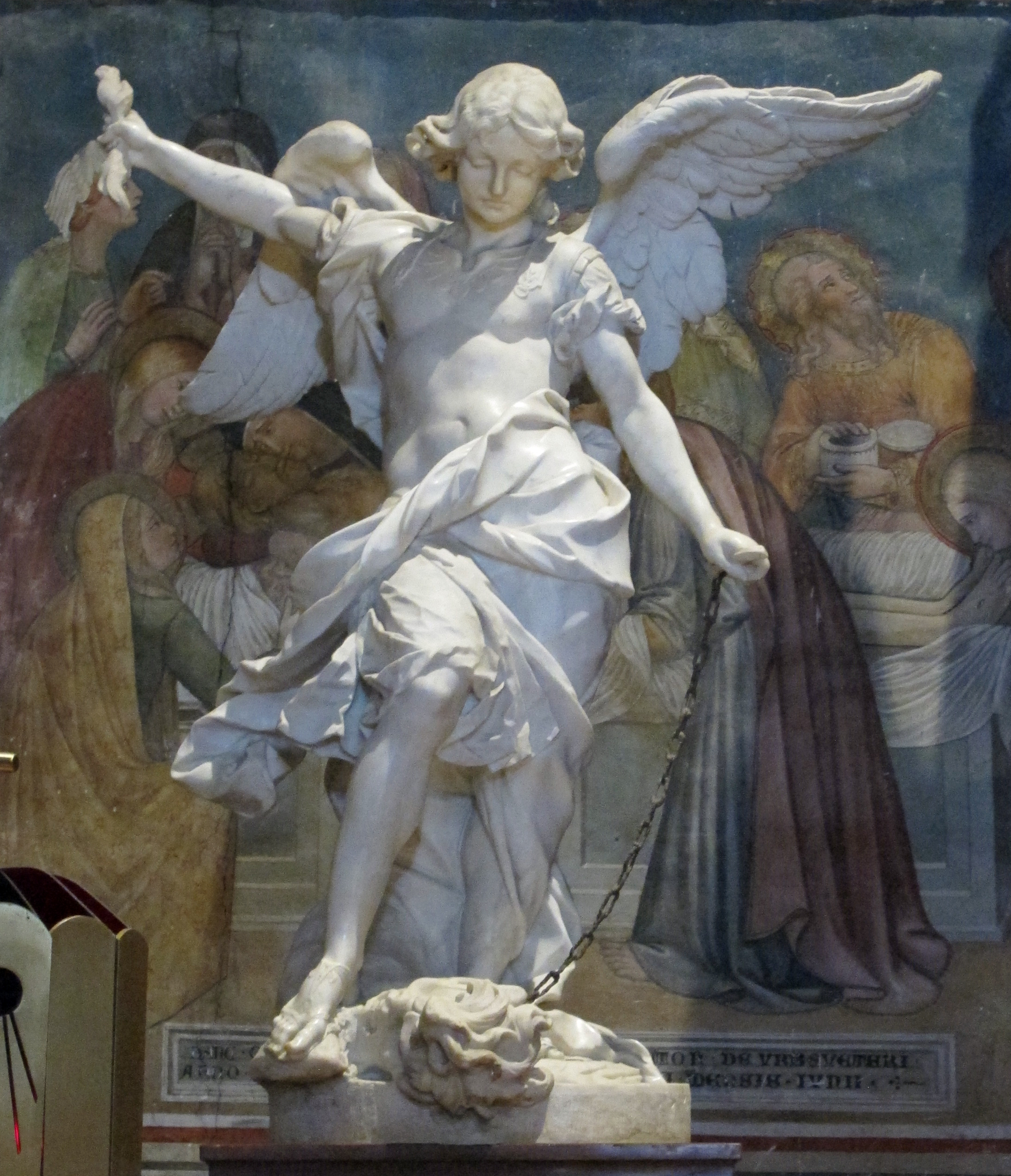
Archangel Michael, 1729, Orvieto Cathedral

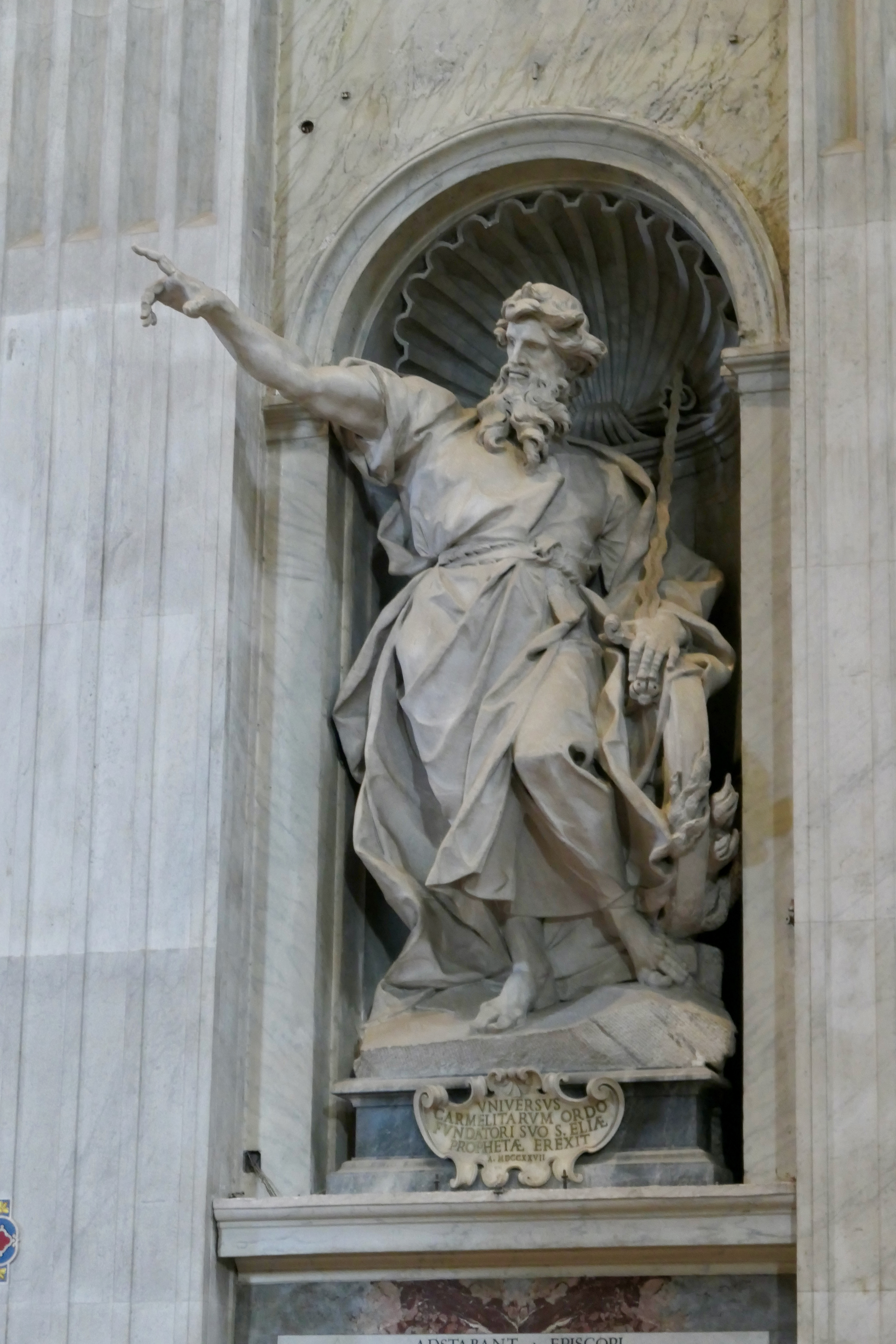
Statue of St. Elijah in Saint Peter's Basilica

== See also ==
- Equestrian statue of Charlemagne (Cornacchini)

== Sources ==
- Engass, Robert (1983). "CORNACCHINI, Agostino". Dizionario Biografico degli Italiani (in Italian). Vol. 29: Cordier–Corvo. Rome: Istituto dell'Enciclopedia Italiana. ISBN 978-88-12-00032-6.
