= Charles Colbert =

Charles Colbert may refer to:

- Charles Colbert, Marquis of Croissy (1625–1696), French statesman and diplomat
- Charles Joachim Colbert (1667–1738), bishop of Montpellier
