= Jean Soanen =

French Oratorian and bishop (1647–1740)

Jean Soanen C.O.I.M.
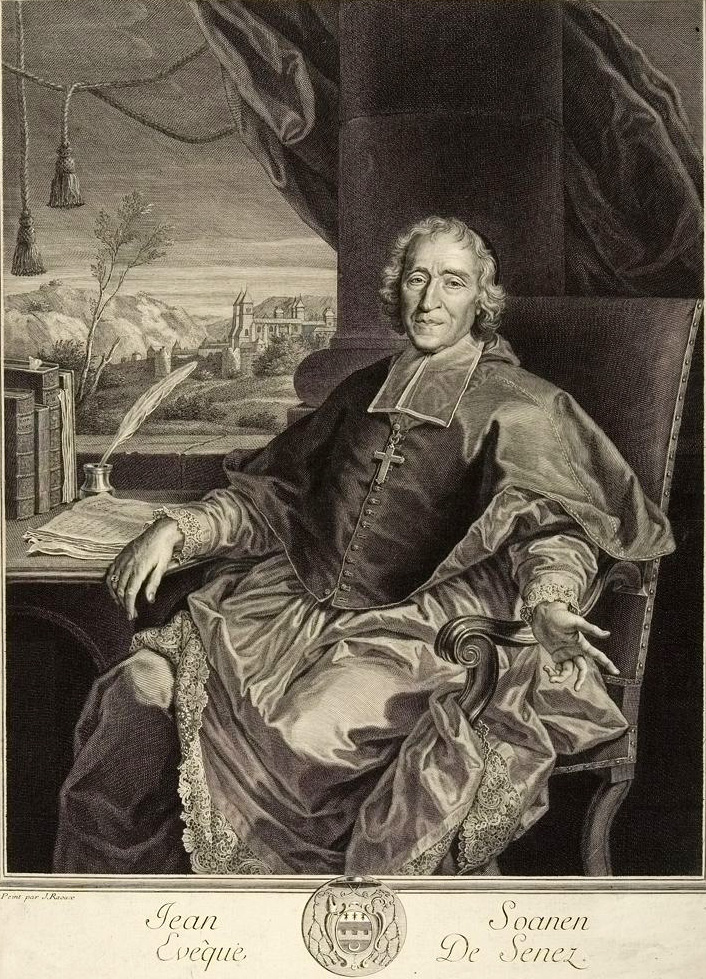
- Church: Roman Catholic
- Diocese: Senez
- In office: 8 September 1695 – 21 September 1727
- Predecessor: Louis Anne Aubert de Villeserin
- Successor: Louis-François-Gabriel d'Orléans de La Motte (administrator)

Orders
- Consecration: 1 July 1696 by Louis-Antoine de Noailles
- Rank: Bishop

Personal details
- Born: 6 January 1647 Riom, France
- Died: 25 December 1740 (aged 93) La Chaise-Dieu, France

Jean Soanen (6 January 1647 – 25 December 1740) was a French Oratorian and bishop of Senez. He was a convinced Jansenist.

In opposition to the papal bull Unigenitus, he with Charles-Joachim Colbert, bishop of Montpellier, Pierre de la Broue who was bishop of Mirepoix, and Pierre de Langle who was bishop of Boulogne, appealed against it in 1717 to a general council. This group and their followers were known as Appellants; the council was though entirely hypothetical as an idea.

Later, he sent out a pastoral letter to his congregation, urging the reading of Pasquier Quesnel. Pierre Guérin de Tencin, the archbishop of Embrun, then in 1727 had him exiled from his diocese.

But Jean Soanen of Senez, a small mountain diocese in Provence, issued in 1726 a Pastoral instruction to his diocese, in which, at the age of 80, he reviewed his whole position in the controversy. He regretted that he had ever signed the Formulary of 1665, withdrew his adhesion to the Bull "Vineam Domini Sabaoth", blamed himself for prohibiting, against his real convictions, the moral Reflexions, and promised never to accept the Unigenitus. Soanen was deprived of his see by the Provincial Synoid of Embrun, which on carious canonical grounds he refused to recognize, and was banished to the Abbey of La Chaise-Dieu in Auvergne, where he remained imprisoned till his death in 1740, at the age of 95.

He died in 1740 at La Chaise-Dieu, where he was exiled since 1727.
