= Roman Catholic Diocese of Senez =

Coordinates: 43.91°N 6.41°E

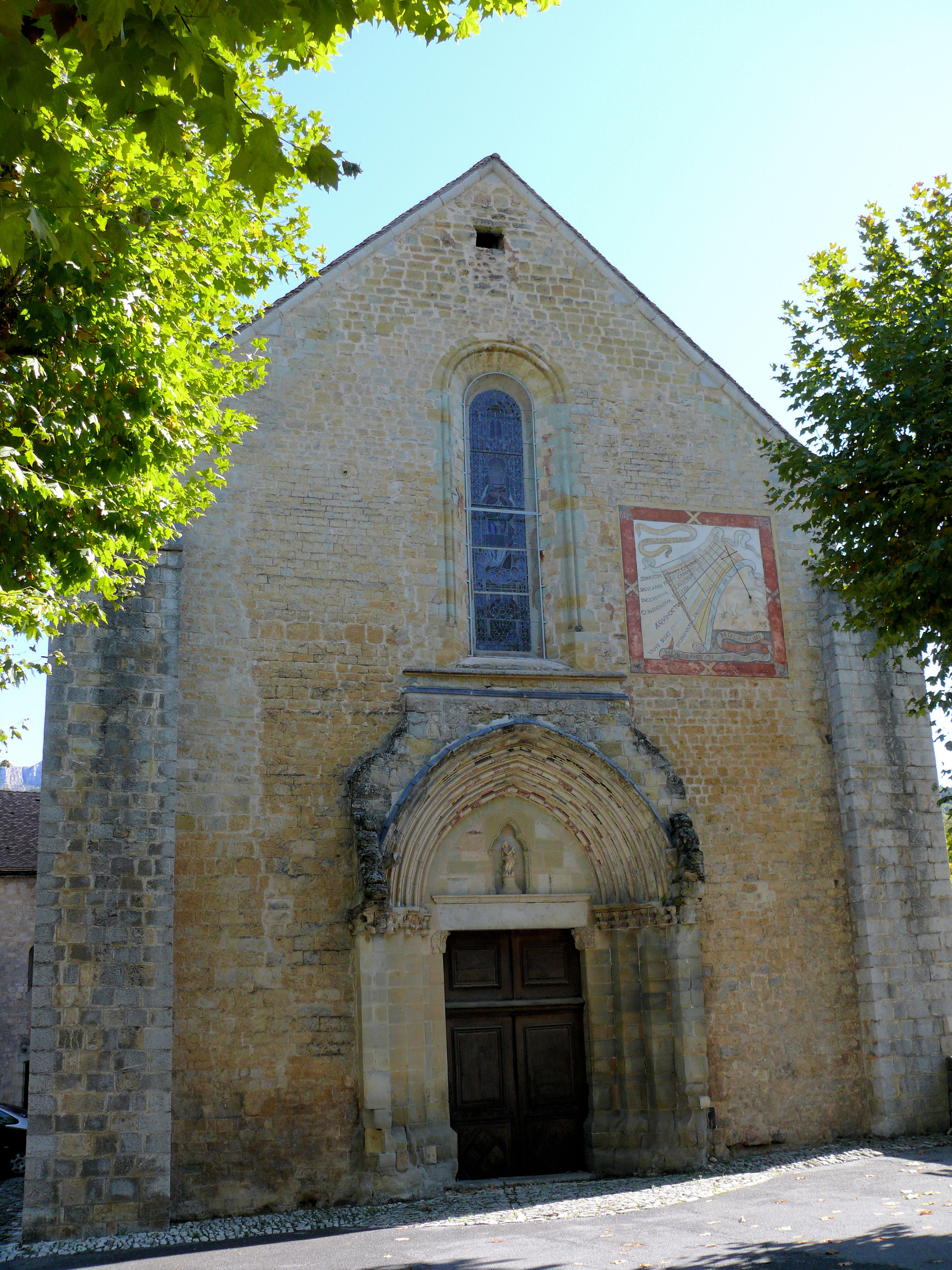
Senez Cathedral

The former French Catholic diocese of Senez existed from around the fifth or sixth century, until the French Revolution. Its see was at Senez, in southern France, in the modern department of Alpes-de-Haute-Provence. After the Concordat of 1801 the territory of the diocese was added to that of the diocese of Digne.

== History ==
Marcellus (Marcel), the first known bishop of Senez, attended the Council of Agde in 506; nevertheless, Senez must have been an episcopal city as early as 439.

Jean Soanen, the Oratorian, noted for his opposition to the papal bull Unigenitus, was Bishop of Senez from 1696 until the time of his deposition in 1727.

== Bishops ==
- Ursus c. 450
- Marcellus (Marcel) I. 475?-c. 506
- Simplice 541-552
- Vigile 585-588
- Marcel II. c. 615
- Peter I. c. 993-1027
- Ameil 1028-1043
- Hugo 1043-c. 1057
- Stephan 1060-c. 1089
- Peter II. 1089-1108
- Aldebert de Castellane c. 1123-c. 1146
- Erard (Isnard) 1155-1159
- Pons 1170-1174
- Maurel c. 1189
- William I. 1213-1215
- Johann I. 1217-1238
- Peter III. 1238-1242?
- Wilhelm II. 1242-1243
- Sigismund 1243-1245
- Wilhelm III. 1246-1255
- Raimund 1255-1260
- Bertrand de Séguret 1290-1312
- Albert c. 1315
- Bertrand II. 1317-1346
- Bertrand III. 1346-1358
- Bertrand IV. 1358-1362
- Pierre D'Aynard 1362-1368
- Robert Gervais c. 1368-c. 1390
- Isnard de Saint-Julien 1392-1408
- Aimon de Nicolaï 1408-1409 (then bishop of Huesca)
- Jean de Seillons 1409-1442
- Georges de Clariani 1442-1459
- Elzéar de Villeneuve 1459-1490
- Nicolas de Villeneuve 1492-1507
- Nicolas de Fieschi 1507-1512 (Cardinal)
- Jean-Baptiste de Laigue D'Oraison 1512-1546
- Pierre de Quiqueran de Beaujeu 1546-1550
- Nicolas de Jarente de Senas 1550?-1551
- Théodore Jean de Clermont de Talard 1551-1560 ?
- Jean de Clausse de Monchy (Mouchy) 1561-1587
- Louis de Bertons de Crillon 1587-1601 (administrator)
- Jacques Martín 1601-1623
- Louis Duchaine 1623-1671
- Louis Anne Aubert de Villeserin 1671-1695
- Jean Soanen 1696-1727
- Vacant 1727-1741
- Louis Jacques François de Vocance 1741-1756
- Antoine-Joseph D'Amat de Volx 1757-1771
- Étienne François Xavier des Michels de Champorcin 1771-1773 (then bishop of Toul)
- Jean-Baptiste-Charles Marie de Beauvais 1774-1783
- Sixte-Louis-Constance Ruffo (Roux) de Bonneval 1783-1784
- Jean-Joseph-Victor de Castellane Adhémar 1784-1788
- Jean-Baptiste-M.-Scipion Ruffo (Roux) de Bonneval 1789-1790

== See also ==
- Catholic Church in France
- List of Catholic dioceses in France

== Bibliography ==
=== Sources ===
- Gams, Pius Bonifatius (1873). Series episcoporum Ecclesiae catholicae: quotquot innotuerunt a beato Petro apostolo. Ratisbon: Typis et Sumptibus Georgii Josephi Manz. pp. 548–549. (Use with caution; obsolete)
- Eubel, Conradus, ed. (1913). Hierarchia catholica, Tomus 1 (second ed.). Münster: Libreria Regensbergiana. p. 301. (in Latin)
- Eubel, Conradus, ed. (1914). Hierarchia catholica, Tomus 2 (second ed.). Münster: Libreria Regensbergiana. p. 175.
- Eubel, Conradus, ed. (1923). Hierarchia catholica, Tomus 3 (second ed.). Münster: Libreria Regensbergiana.
- Gauchat, Patritius (Patrice) (1935). Hierarchia catholica IV (1592-1667). Münster: Libraria Regensbergiana. p. 219.
- Ritzler, Remigius; Sefrin, Pirminus (1952). Hierarchia catholica medii et recentis aevi V (1667-1730). Patavii: Messagero di S. Antonio.

=== Studies ===
- Jean, Armand (1891). Les évêques et les archevêques de France depuis 1682 jusqu'à 1801 (in French). Paris: A. Picard. p. 520.
- Pisani, Paul (1907). Répertoire biographique de l'épiscopat constitutionnel (1791-1802) (in French). Paris: A. Picard et fils.
