= Pierre de La Broue =

French bishop (1644–1720)

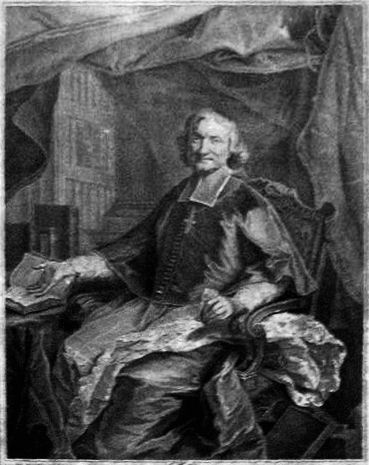
Copy of a now-lost Hyacinthe Rigaud painting of La Broue.

Pierre de La Broue (8 February 1644, Toulouse, Languedoc - 20 September 1720, Mirepoix was a French bishop. He was part of the 'Apellant' movement within Jansenism, which called for the summoning of a church council to discuss the anti-Jansenist papal bull Unigenitus.

== Life ==
From a family of magistrates from Moissac, he chose a career in the church and around 24 went to study in Paris, where he became a doctor of theology. He was also a favourite preacher at the French royal court (according to Madame de Sévigné, he "preached once before the King", at Saint-Germain-en-Laye on 2 February 1679) and heavily linked to Bossuet. He preached the funerary oration for Marie Anne Christine of Bavaria, wife of the dauphin.

In 1679 he was made bishop of Mirepoix and founded a large seminary at Mazères as well as smaller ones at Fanjeaux and Belpech. Whilst bishop he set up a confraternity of pity at Mirepoix and carried out several charitable works. He also aimed to be made deputy to the estates of Languedoc, a request which was never granted. In 1694 he was elected 'mainteneur' of the Acadèmia dels Jòcs Florals, where as a young man he had been praised for a work entitled Adieu aux muses profanes.

With the bishops of Senez (Jean Soanen), Montpellier (Charles-Joachim Colbert de Croissy) and Boulogne (Pierre de Langle), he opposed the bull Unigenitus. According to his wishes, La Broue was buried at the seminary in Mazères.

== Works ==
- Oraison funèbre de très haute, très puissante et excellente princesse Marie-Anne-Christine de Bavière, dauphine de France, prononcée à Saint-Denis, le 5 juin 1690, par messire Pierre de La Broüe (1690)
- Catéchisme du diocèse de Mirepoix. Par le commandement de monseigneur l'illustrissime & révérendissime Pierre de La Broüe évêque de Mirepoix, conseiller du Roy en ses conseils (1699)
- Première Lettre pastorale de Mgr La Broüe aux nouveaux réunis de son diocèse (1702)
- Projet de mandement et d'instruction pastorale de M. l'évêque de Mirepoix au sujet de la constitution de N. S. P. le Pape, du 8 septembre 1713 (1714)
- Défense de la grâce efficace par elle-mesme, par feu Mre Pierre de La Brouë (1721)
