= Saint Charlemagne (Master Theodoric) =

Painting by Master Theodoric

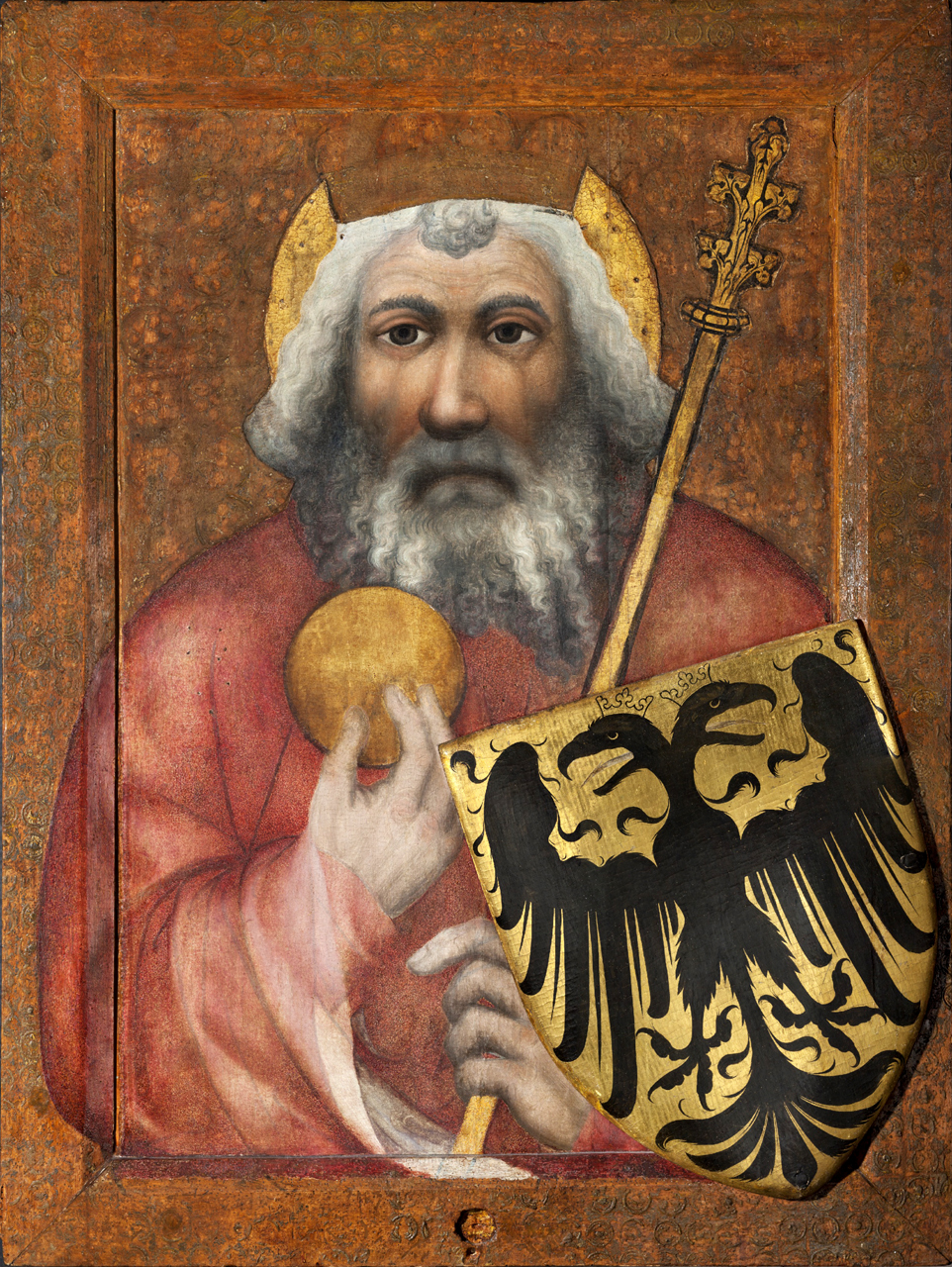
- St. Charles the Great (Master Theodoric)
- Artist: Master Theodoric
- Year: c. 1360–1365
- Medium: oil tempera on beech board
- Dimensions: 116 cm × 87.2 cm (46 in × 34.3 in)
- Location: National Gallery Prague, Prague

Saint Charlemagne (Charles the Great) is an oil tempera on beech board painting by Czech painter Master Theodoric. It is included in the set made for the Chapel of the Holy Cross at Karlštejn by the artist himself. The portrait was placed in a prominent position in the middle of the row of rulers on the west wall of the nave. The quality of the artwork ranks it among the finest works of 14th century European painting. The painting is on display in the collection of medieval art of the National Gallery in Prague.

== Description and classification ==
In the preserved original frame there is a circular reliquary hole at the bottom. A gilded heraldic shield with the imperial emblem - a double-headed eagle is attached to the plate.

The central position of the painting in the composition of the entire western wall of the chapel and the exceptional position of the monarch required the depiction of the face from the front view. The detailed underdrawing of the face as well as the generous layout of the drapery overlapping the frame can be seen in the images taken by infrared reflectography. These confirm that the original design was not changed during the execution of the painting.

The painter's style is identical to other works attributed to Master Theodoric. The painting is characterised by the perfect harmony of grey and ochre tones in the hair and beard and a velvety brown face with a concentrated expression of dark eyes. The pinkish-red robes have been partially damaged by the washing off of the top glazes and the underdrawing shines through in places. The background of the painting and the frame are covered with relief decoration. Charlemagne's head was adorned with a golden imperial crown. This was probably torn off during the siege of Karlštejn by the Hussites, when the other paintings suffered in the same way. The gold was used to pay mercenaries to the defenders of the castle.

=== The relationship of Emperor Charles IV to Charlemagne ===
The restorer of the Holy Roman Empire was of special importance to Emperor Charles IV, who traced his lineage back to the Přemyslid dynasty and Charlemagne. He showed him boundless respect and considered him a model of a good and just ruler and his patron. He conceived his coronation as Holy Roman Emperor in the Carolingian Chapel in Aachen in 1349 as a religious pilgrimage to the holy relics and brought the relics of Charlemagne to Prague. Later, he had a Gothic choir with a chapel of St. Wenceslaus added at Aachen, where he donated precious goldsmith's reliquaries. In 1351, he founded the Church of the Assumption of the Virgin Mary and St. Charlemagne in Prague's New Town, on an unusual octagonal plan, inspired by the chapel at Aachen. Charles IV kept the coronation treasure of the Holy Roman Empire, which included relics as well as the 11th-century imperial crown associated with the veneration of Charlemagne.

In 1453-1454, Charles IV summoned the Italian priest and papal legate Giovanni de' Marignolli to Prague to compile a chronicle of the Roman Empire and a genealogy of the Luxembourg family. Master Theodoric's paintings were preceded by a gallery of figures of monarchs, including Charlemagne, painted in 1355-1360 in the main hall of the Imperial Palace at Karlštejn by the Master of the Luxembourg Family Tree (destroyed before 1597). According to the report of Jan of Hazmburk, the palace at Prague Castle was similarly decorated (paintings were destroyed in a fire in 1541).

=== Charlemagne in the works of goldsmiths, painters and sculptors ===
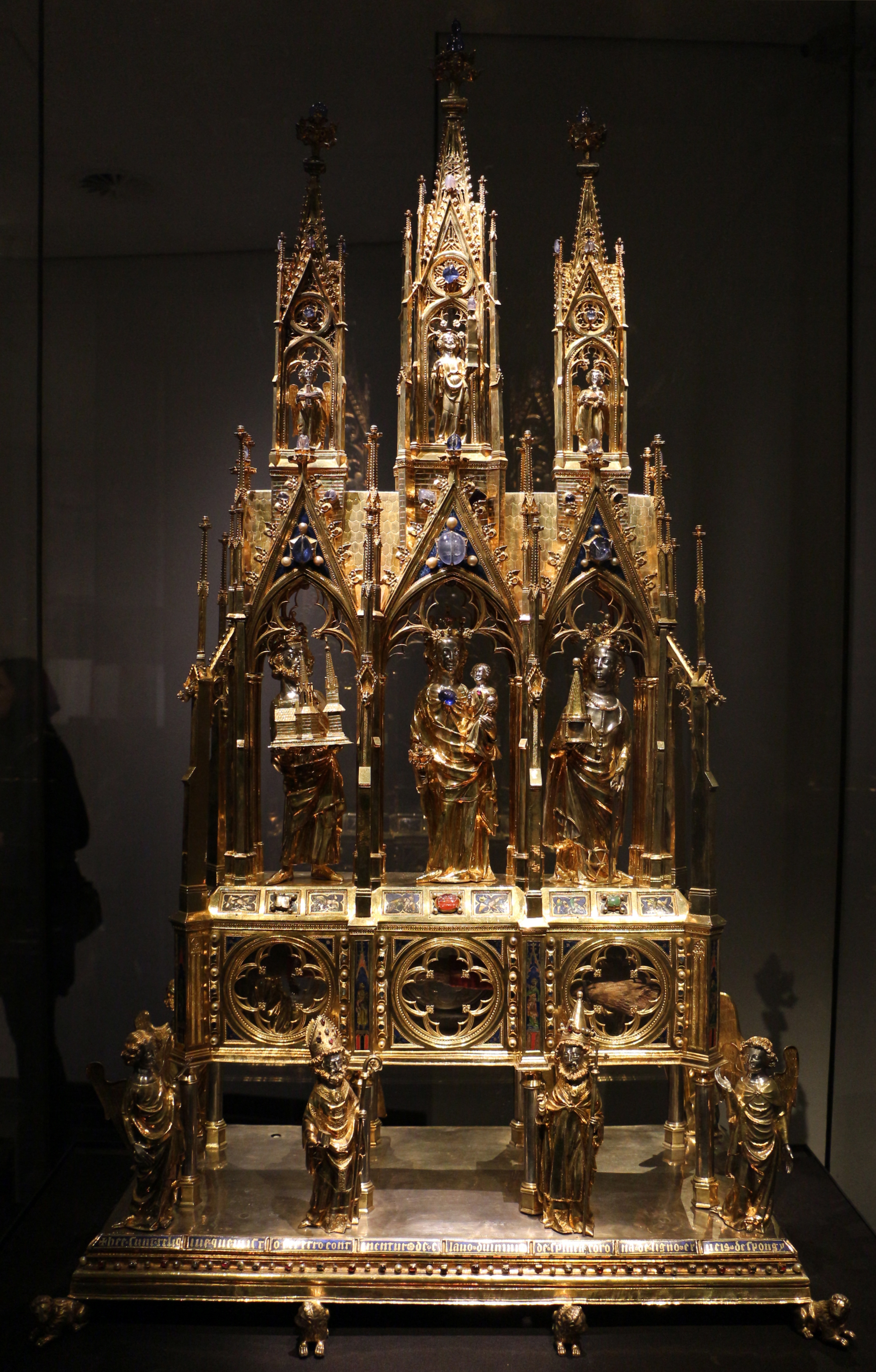
Reliquary of Charlemagne donated by Charles IV, Aachen (1350)

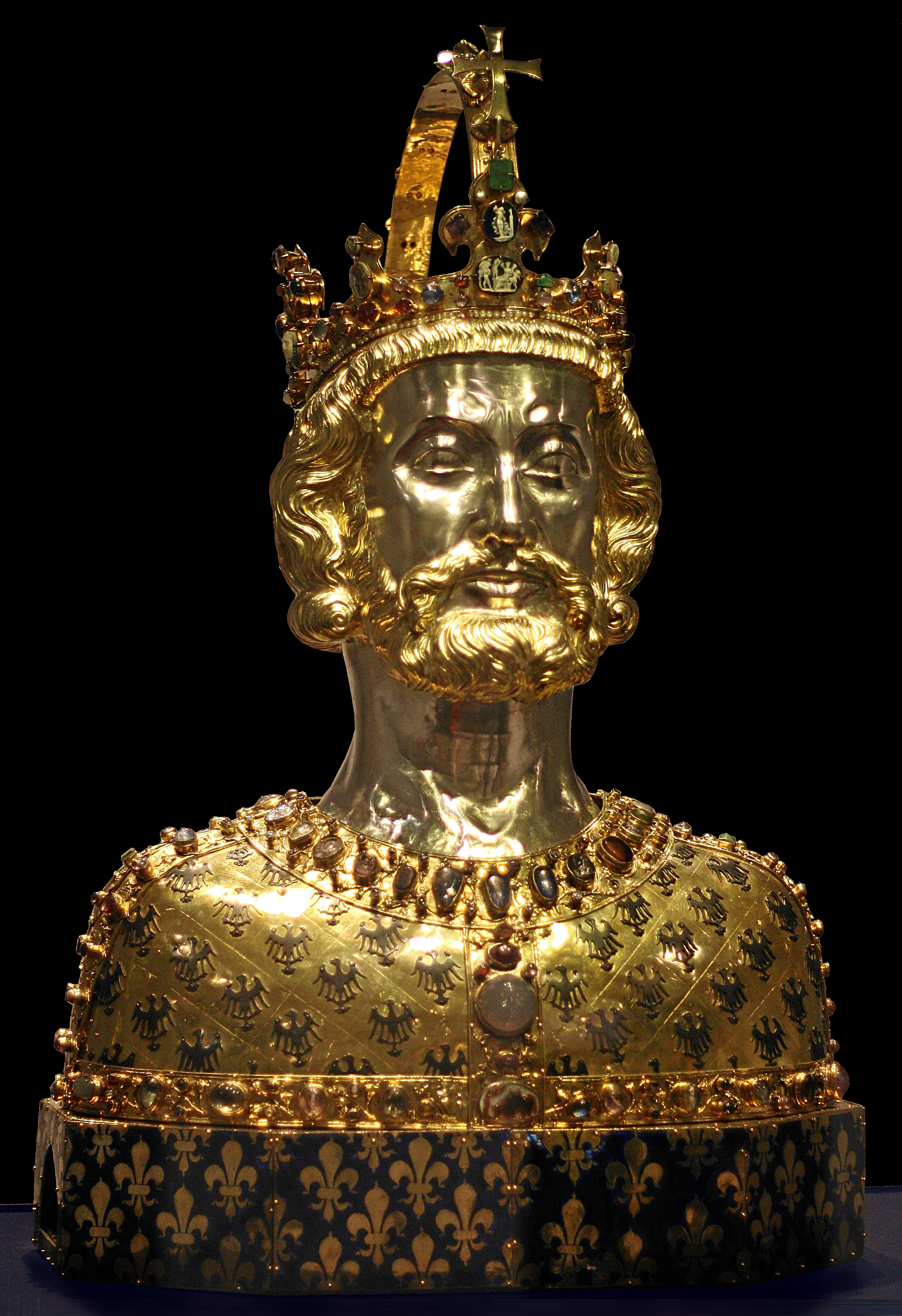
Reliquary bust of Charlemagne, commissioned by Charles IV, Aachen

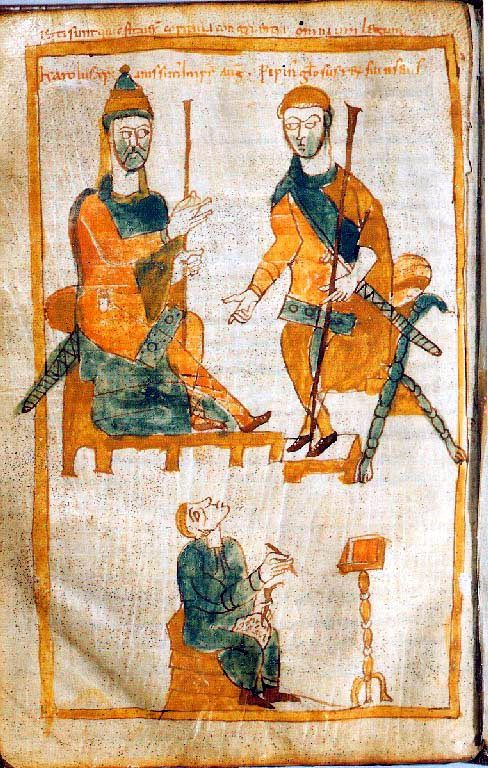
Charlemagne and Pippin the Hunchback, original from 829-836 (copy from the 10th century).

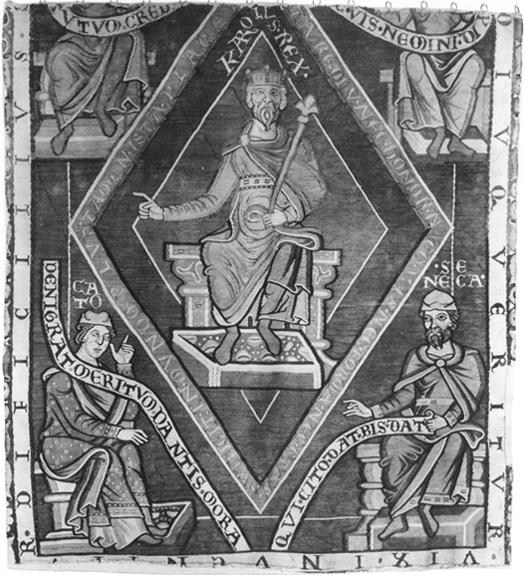
Charlemagne, Halberstadt (12th-century illumination)

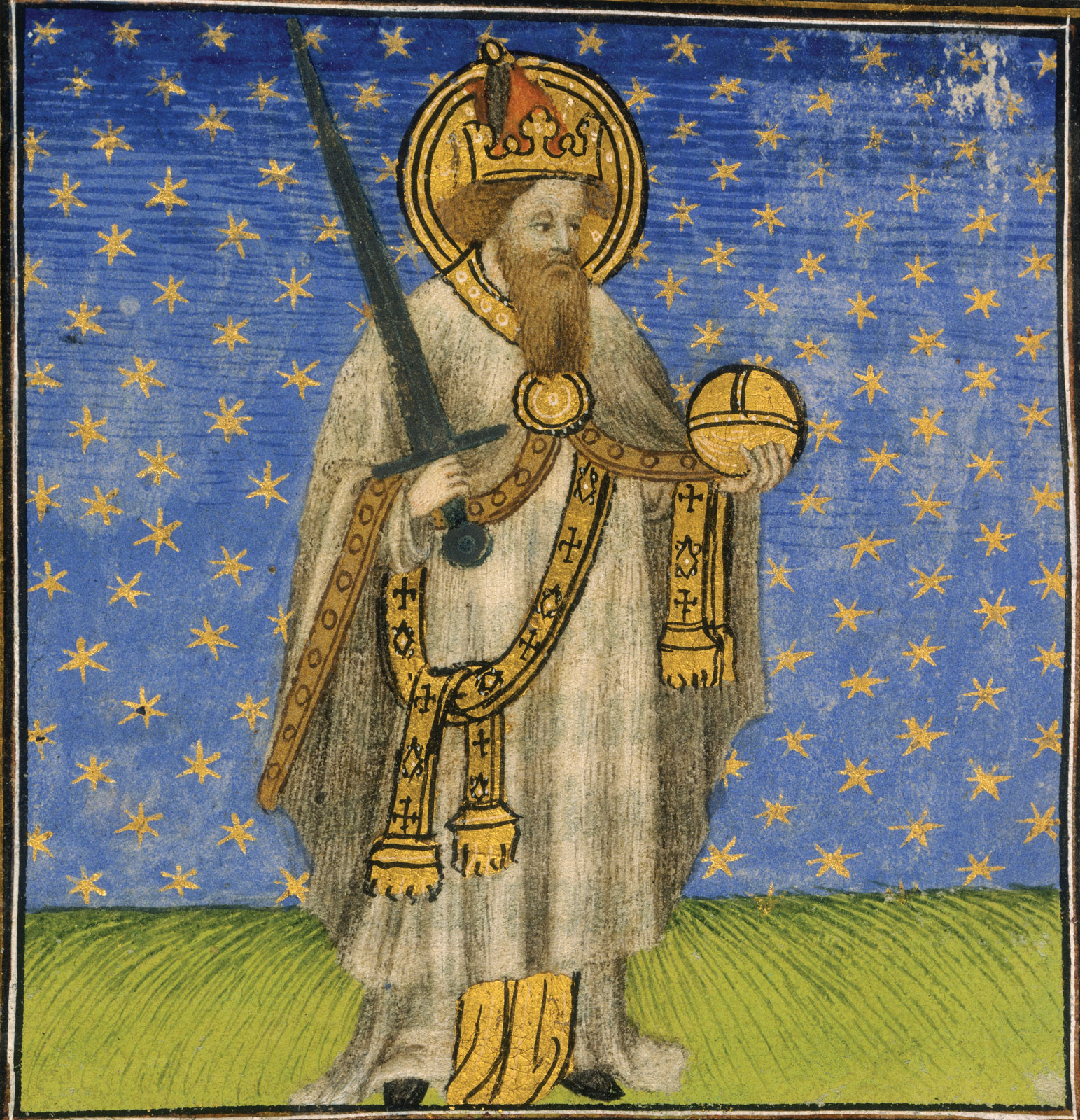
Charlemagne (15th century illumination)

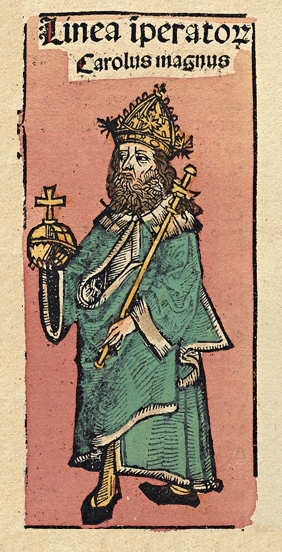
Schedel's Nuremberg Chronicle, woodcut (1493)

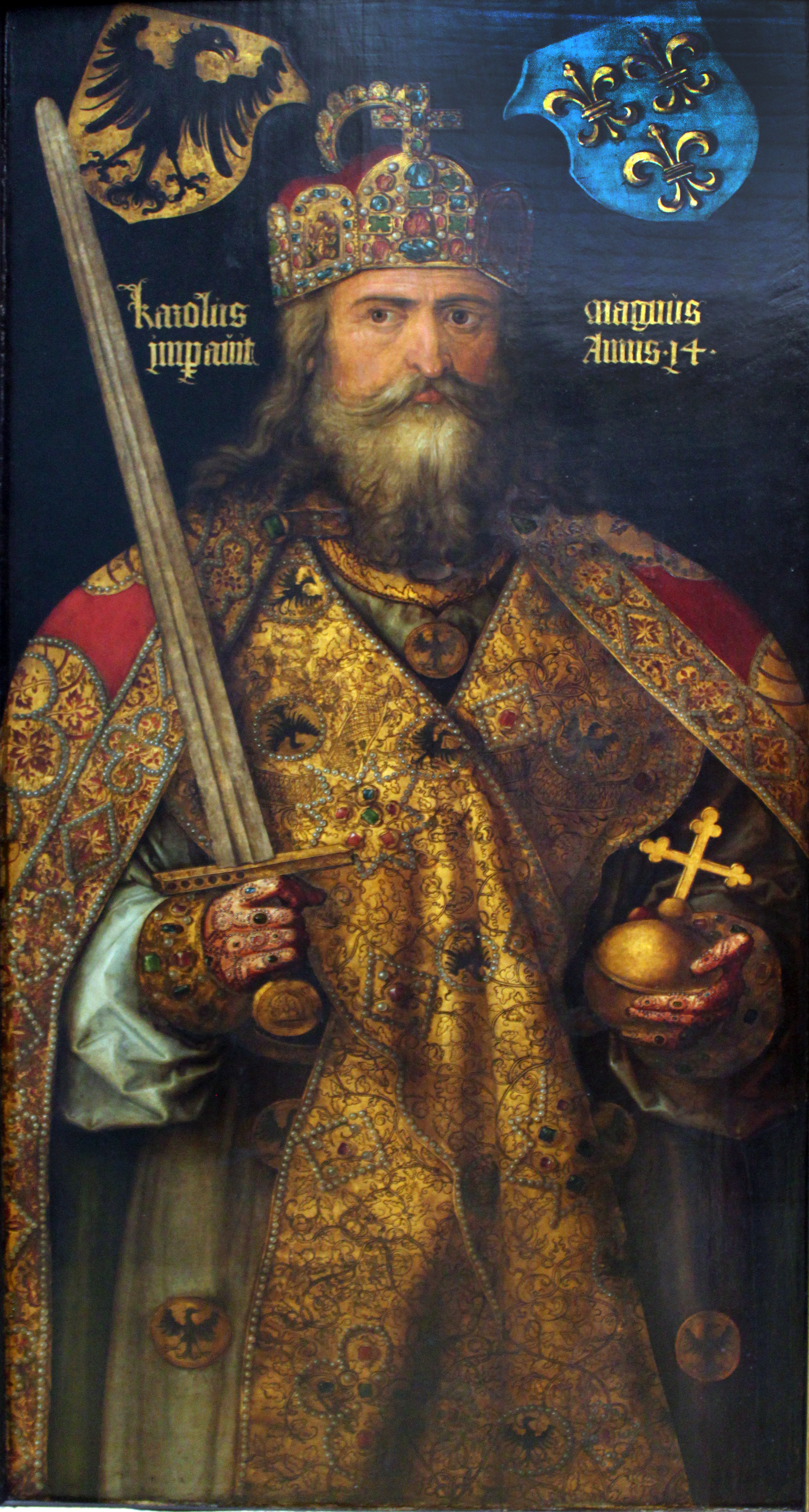
Kaiser Karl der Große, Albrecht Dürer (1512)

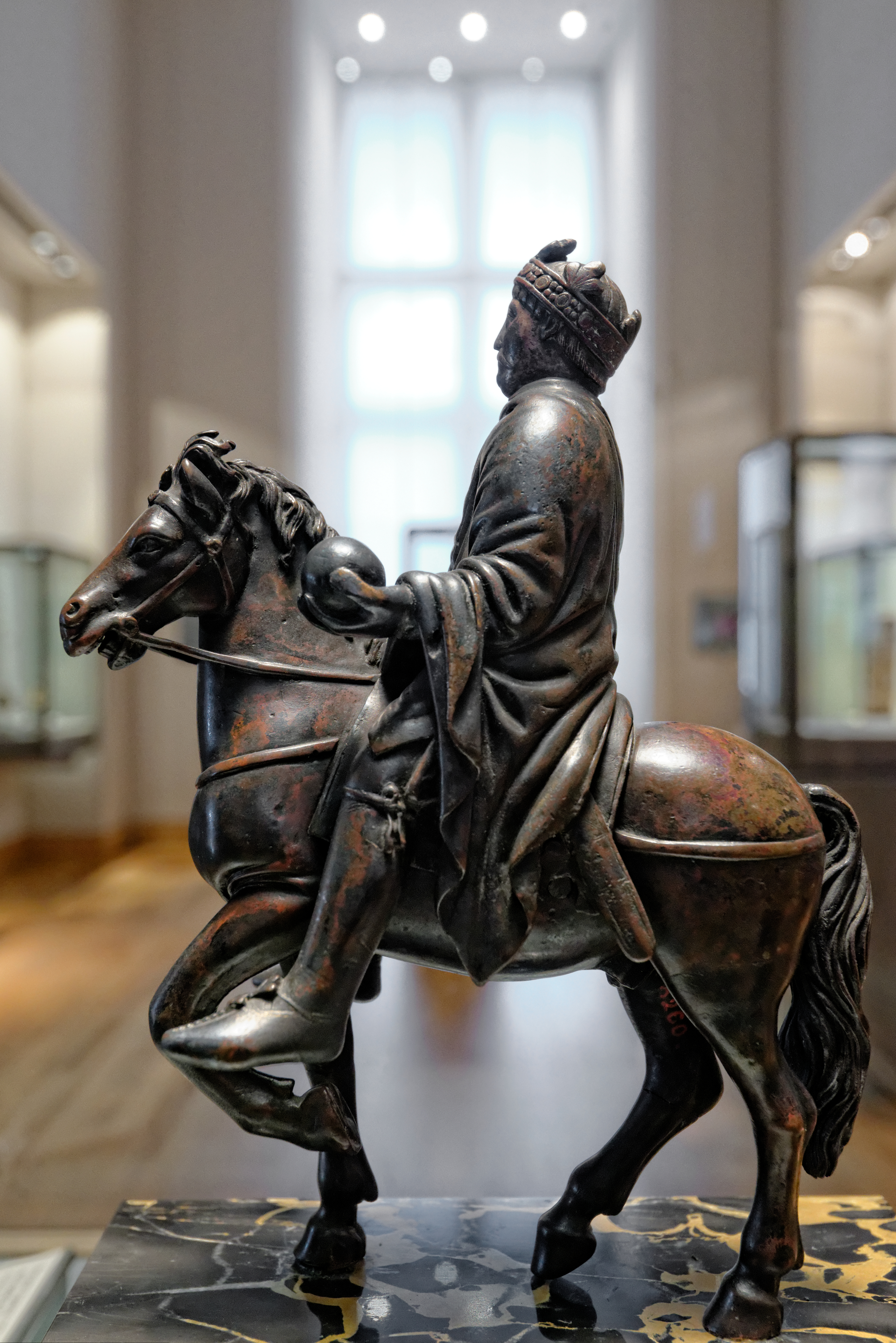
Charlemagne, equestrian statue, Louvre (9th century)

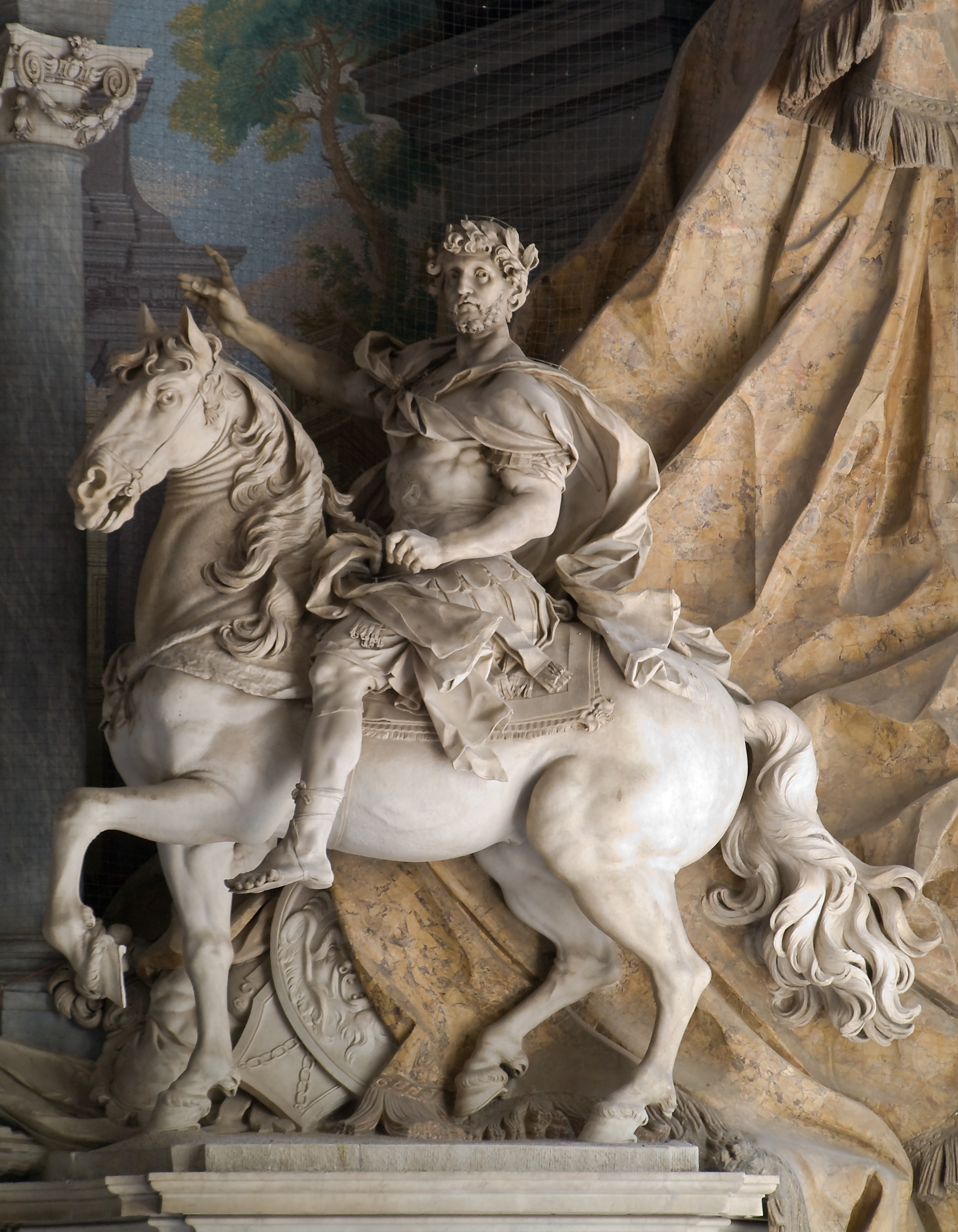
Equestrian statue of Charlemagne, by Agostino Cornacchini (1725), St. Peter's Basilica, Vatican

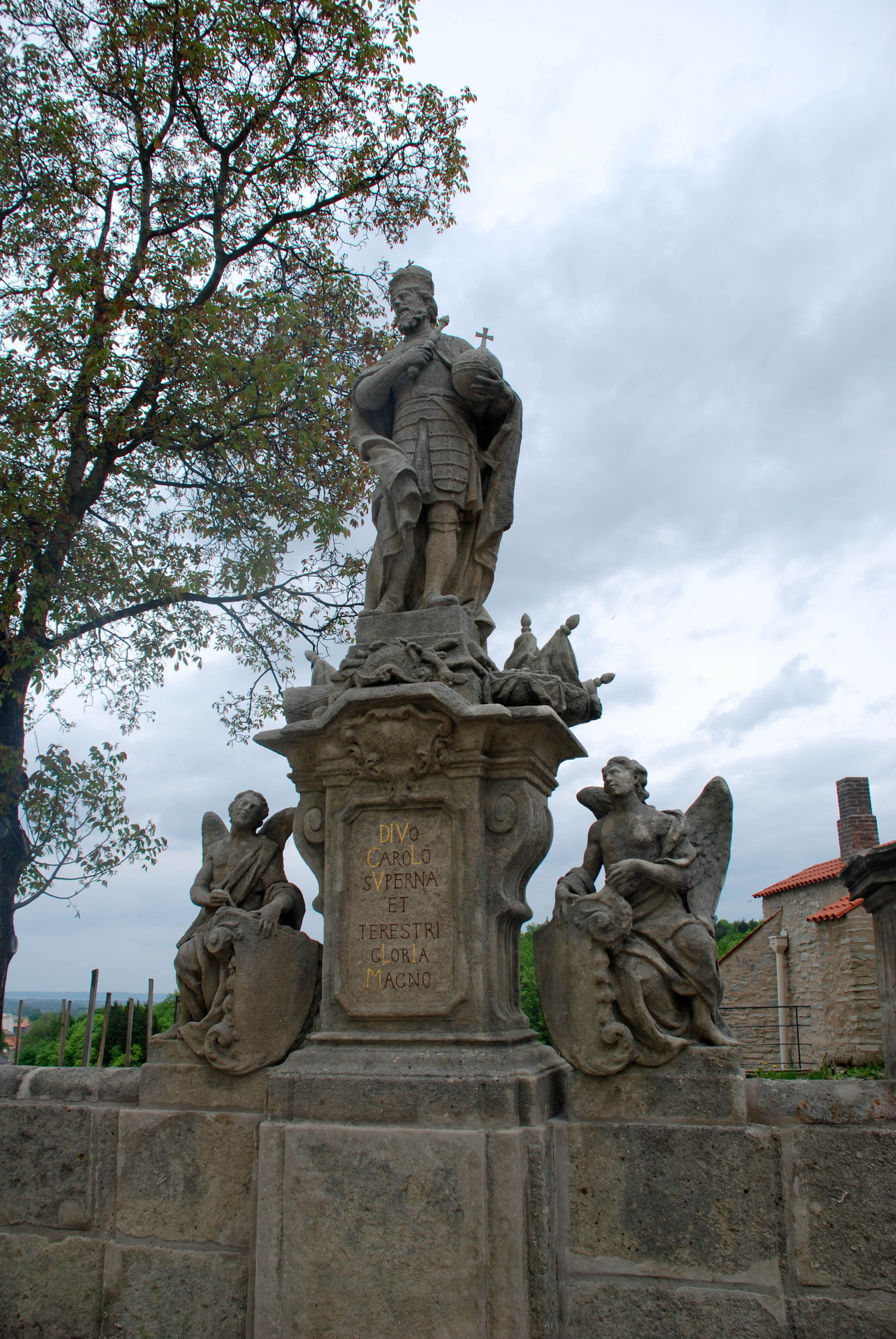
Carolus Magnus, Kutná Hora

== Sources ==
- Fajt Jiří, Chlumská Štěpánka, Bohemia and Central Europe 1200-1550, National Gallery in Prague 2014, ISBN 978-80-7035-569-5
- Kubínová, Kateřina, Marignola's Chronicle as an image of the ideas of power and position of the Czech king. In: Mediaevalia Historica Bohemica / Prague : Historický ústav AV ČR 6, (1999) p. 77-94.
- Jiří Fajt (ed.), Magister Theodoricus, court painter to Emperor Charles IV, National Gallery in Prague 1997, ISBN 80-7035-142-X
- Karel Stejskal, Charles IV as a Collector, pp. 455-467, in: Vaněček V (ed.) Karolus Quartus, Charles University, Prague 1984
- Antonín Friedl, Mikuláš Wurmser, master of royal portraits at Karlštejn, SNKLHU Prague 1956
