= Biblioteca Fabroniana, Pistoia =

Coordinates: 43.9350°N 10.9138°E

The Biblioteca Fabroniana is a public library, founded in 1726, and located on Piazzetta San Filippo #1 in Pistoia, region of Tuscany, Italy.

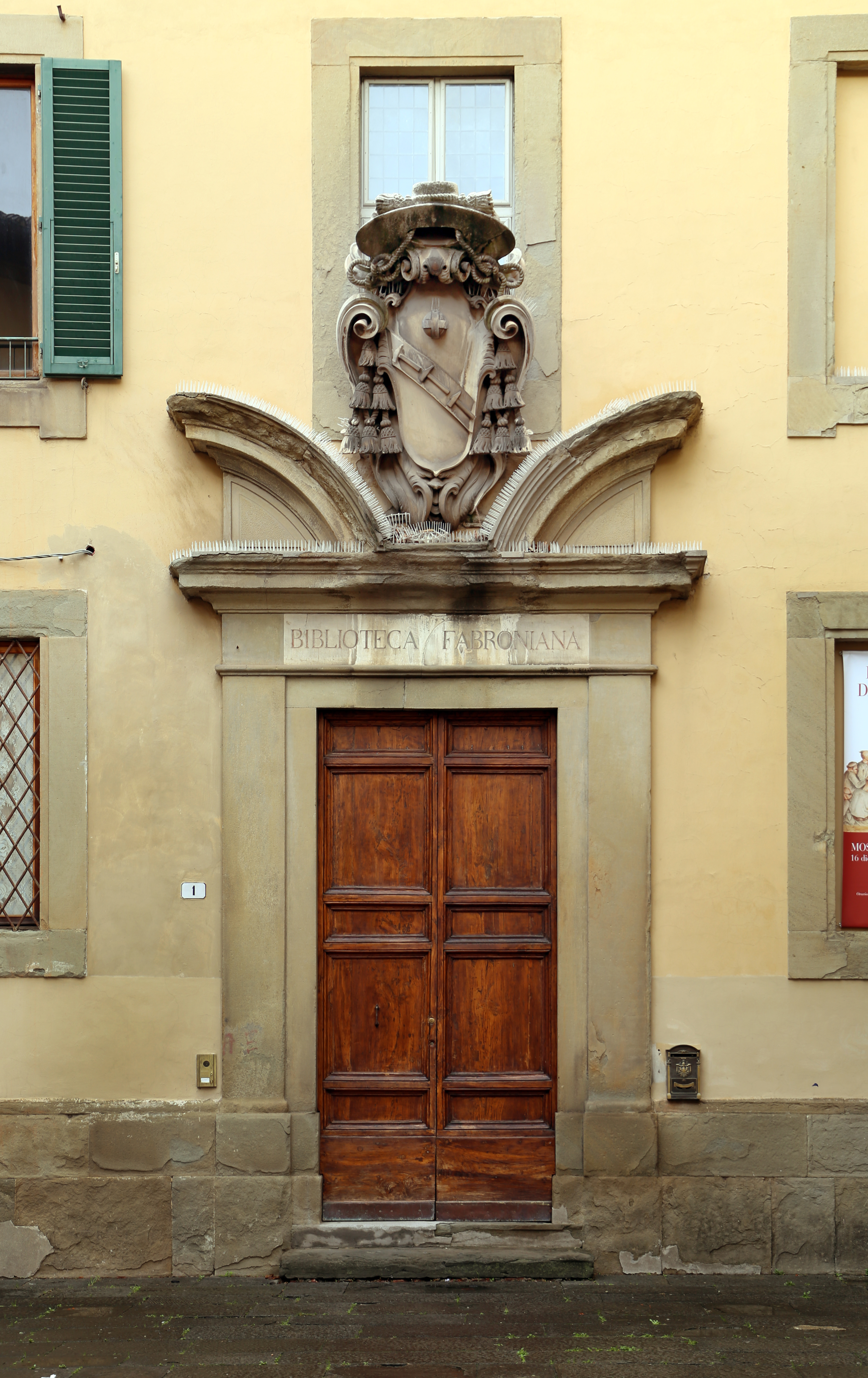
Portal to Library

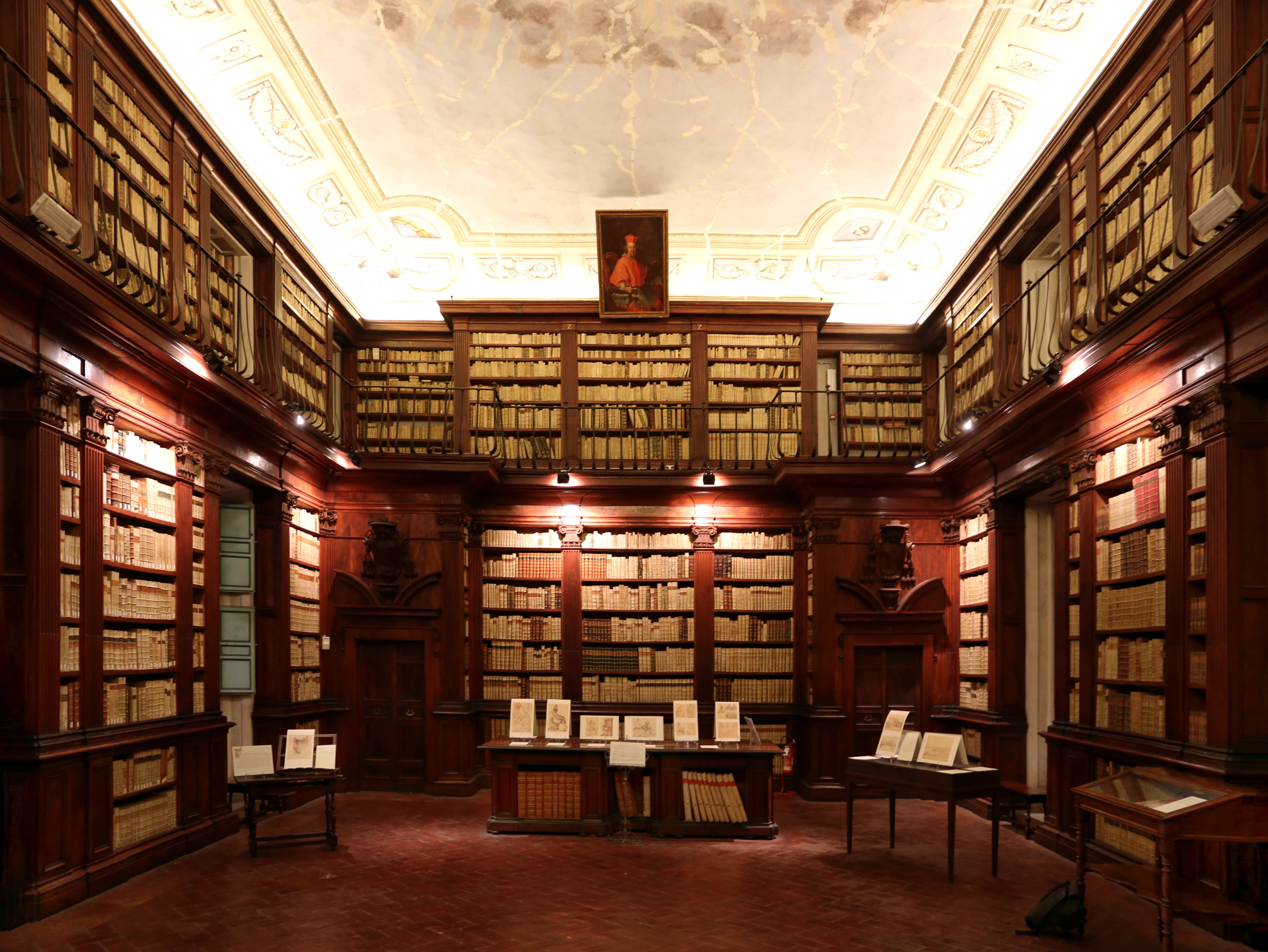
Reading Room

== History ==
The library was founded in 1726 in a site adjacent to the church of Santi Filippo e Prospero. The basis of the collection was the library of the Cardinal Carlo Agostino Fabroni. Refurbishment of the building to hold the library began in 1722; the endowment conditioned that the library "always and forever serve with ease the public needs of the city. The cardinal's collection was transported from Rome to Livorno by two galleys commissioned by Pope Benedict XIII, and then overland to Pistoia. The library was first housed and administered by the Pistoiese Oratorian congregation. It was open to the public in 1730 and competed with the other large library of Pistoia, the Biblioteca Forteguerriana.

In 1810, following the suppression of the Oratorians, the administration moved to the City, and after the fall of the Napoleonic regime, to the Chapter of the Cathedral Chapter, as envisaged in the bequest of Fabroni. The Cathedral still manages the facility.

== Structure and Collection ==
The building was refitted to make a library by Francesco Maria Gatteschi. The portal with the superiorly concave tympanum consisting of two half-arches, nestles the coat of arms of Cardinal Fabroni. The staircase entrance is decorated with quadratura frescoes, and opens to a large reading room, dominated by a statue of the cardinal by Gaetano Masoni. On either side of the entrance are two marble sculptures, depicting the "Birth" and "The Deposition" by Augusto Cornacchini. The scroll above the door threatens the curse of excommunication to any that steals a book from the room. The book stacks are two stories high, and at each corner of the room is a small reading cubicle.

The library was further enlarged in 1869 by the Countess Eugenia Caselli, the last female descendant of the Fabroni family, in 1917 by the collection of the Pistoiese lawyer Tommaso Gelli and by the addition of collections from both the Oratorions and Franciscans from the Giaccherino. Assets now include nearly 20,000 printed volumes, including precious incunabula and over 400 manuscripts.

The cardinals collection included nearly 2,400 folios, 1,800 quartos, and 2,460 sesti; the collection covered subjects of theology, philosophy, history, geography, mathematics, and philology. It was notable for including books under censure by the Church, but accessible to the cardinal by virtue of his post as Secretary of the Propaganda Fide. The library collections now cover the works of the Fathers of the Church; ecclesiastical histories; rules of monastic orders; hagiographic works of the Sacred Rota; documents on Jansenism; the Council of Trent; and the Bolla Unigenitus for which Fabroni was a major author, and which censured Jansenism. Besides these, there is an important collection dedicated to the Catholic Jesuit missions in China, works of medicine, physics, natural sciences, arithmetic and geometry.

== See also ==
- Books in Italy
