= Senez Cathedral =

Cathedral in Senez, France

Coordinates: 43°54′47″N 6°24′24″E

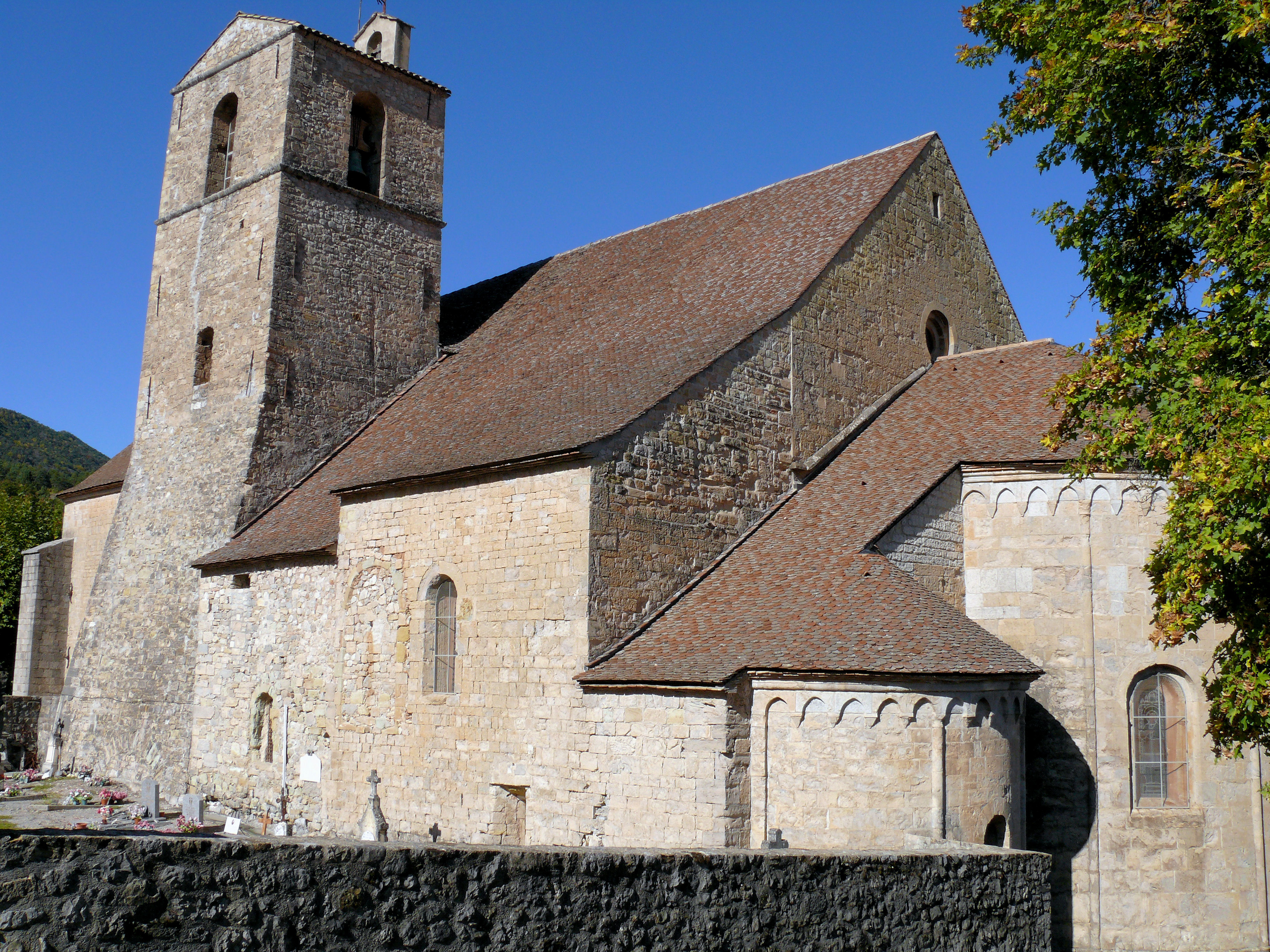
Senez Cathedral

Senez Cathedral (Cathédrale Notre-Dame-de-l'Assomption de Senez) is a Roman Catholic church and former cathedral, and national monument of France, in Senez.

It was formerly the seat of the Bishopric of Senez, abolished under the Concordat of 1801, when its territory was added to the Diocese of Digne.

== Building history ==
The present Romanesque church stands on the site of several older cathedral buildings, but itself dates from the 12th-13th centuries. Construction started in 1176 and the cathedral was consecrated on 22 October 1246.

It suffered severely in the French Wars of Religion and its belltower was destroyed by Protestants. It was rebuilt in the 17th century.

It is particularly known for its church furnishings. The tapestries (seven by Aubusson, end of the 17th century, and one by Audemar of Enghien, end of the 16th century) were presented by Monseigneur de Ruffo Bonneval (bishop of Senez 1783–1784) to mark the completion of the restoration. Napoleon I passed through Senez on 3 March 1815 and greatly admired them. The church's choir stalls, lectern and altar, of the 17th and 18th centuries, are also particularly fine. It has two altarpieces of carved and gilded wood, also from the 17th century.

Outside, on the west wall, is a sundial, dating from 1673 and repainted in 1784.

== Sources ==
- Provenceweb: Description of cathedral and village of Senez
- Diocese of Digne website: Senez Cathedral
- Route Napoleon website: Senez village and cathedral
