= Equestrian statue of Charlemagne (Cornacchini) =

Statue by Agostino Cornacchini in St. Peter's Basilica, Vatican City

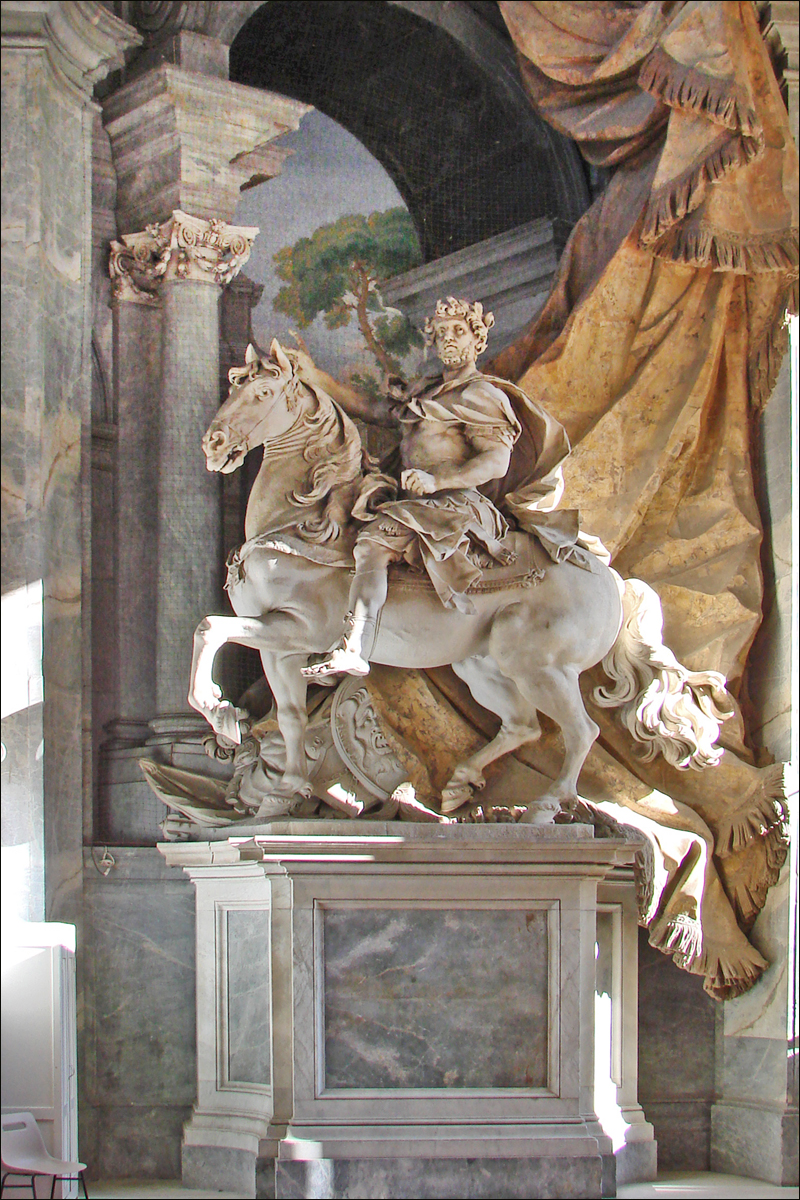
- Artist: Agostino Cornacchini
- Year: 1725
- Type: Sculpture
- Subject: Charlemagne
- Location: St Peter's Basilica, Vatican City

The equestrian statue of Charlemagne (1725), which portrays the Holy Roman Emperor Charlemagne (742–814), was commissioned by Pope Clement XI (1649–1721) and carved by the Italian artist Agostino Cornacchini (1686–1754). It stands to the left (southern) end of the narthex or entrance portico of St Peter's Basilica, opposite the Vision of Constantine statue at the start of the Scala Regia.

== See also ==
- Iconography of Charlemagne
