= Pierre de Langle =

French bishop and Jansenist theologian

Pierre de Langle (6 March 1643, in Evreux – 12 April 1724, in Boulogne-Sur-Mer) was a French bishop and Jansenist theologian.

== Life ==
At the request of his friend Bossuet, he was made tutor to Louis Alexandre, Count of Toulouse. He was abbot of Saint-Lôfrom 24 December 1694; in 1698, Louis XIV rewarded him for his teaching duties by making him bishop of Boulogne, nominating him on 29 March 1698, with the bulls to that effect coming out on 15 September the same year.

De Langle did little of note until the publication of the papal bull Unigenitus, in response to which he published his 1717 Mandement. This was an appeal but led to his disgrace at court and violence in his diocese, with the inhabitants of Calais rising in rebellion and those of Quernes beating de Langle with sticks and throwing stones when he visited them. He thus became part of the 'Appelant' movement alongside Jean Soanen, Pierre de La Broue and Charles-Joachim Colbert de Croissy, calling for a church council to discuss the bull. He and de Croissy opposed the 1720 compromise, causing the Duke of Orleans to banish de Langle from his own diocese.

== Sources ==
- Augustin Gazier, Histoire du mouvement janséniste depuis ses origines jusqu’à nos jours, t. 1, Paris, Honoré Champion, 1924, p. 256.
- C. Landrin, Un prélat gallican, Pierre de Langle, évêque de Boulogne (1644-1724), Calais, Imprimerie J. Peumery, 1905

== See also ==
Jean-Marie Henriau
