= Carlo Agostino Fabroni =

Italian cardinal (1651–1727)

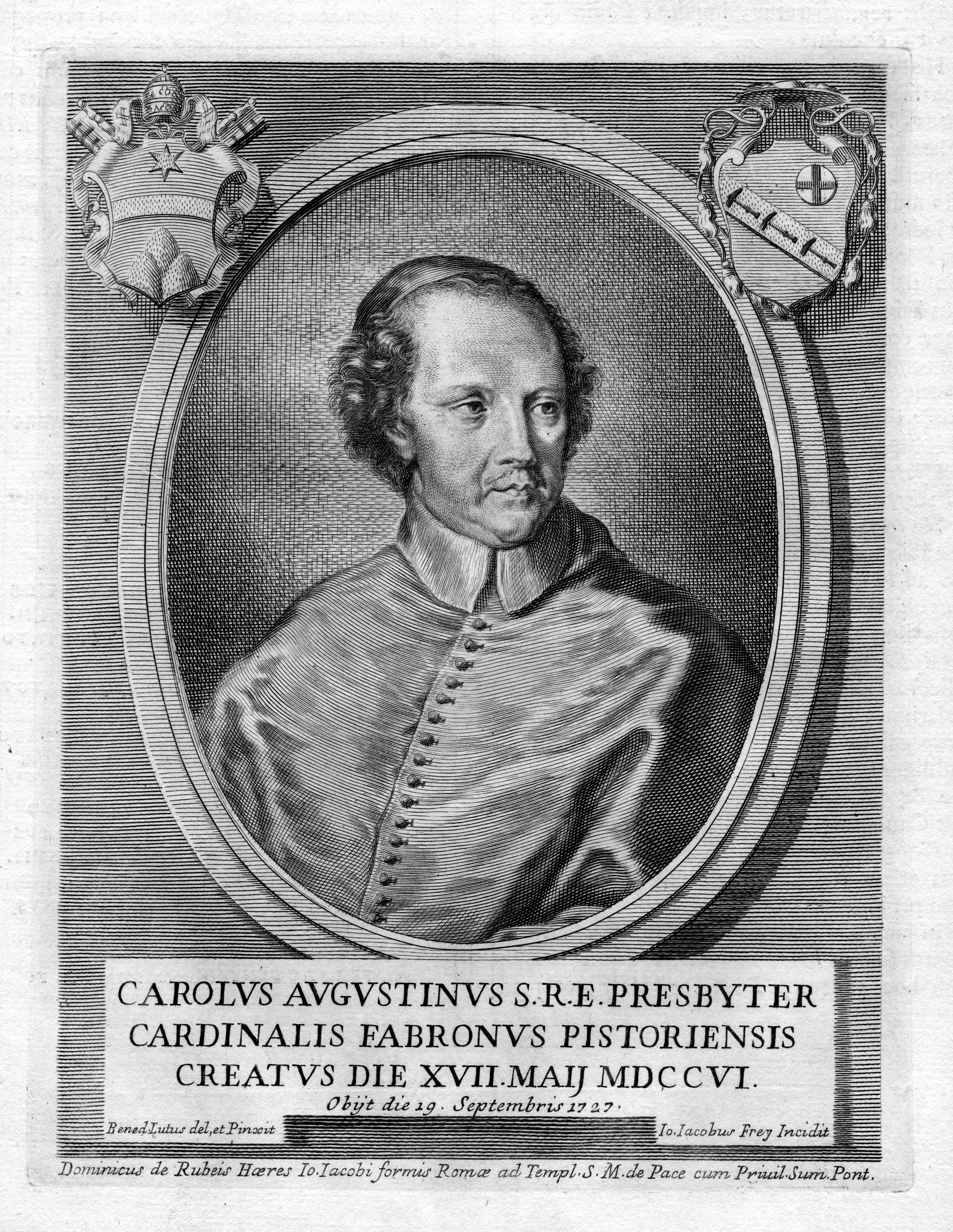
Portrait of Carlo Agostino Fabroni (1651-1727)

Carlo Agostino Fabroni (28 August 1651 - 19 September 1727) was an Italian Roman Catholic cardinal.

== Biography ==
Born in Pistoia to a comfortable family, his studies led him to join the Jesuits. In 1706, he was made cardinal by Pope Clement XI. He became a close advisor and secretary of the Office of Propaganda Fide for Pope Innocent XII. From the latter position, along with the scholar Gregorio Selleri, he coauthored a censure of Jansenism and the writings of Pasquier Quesnel. The censure was released in 1713 by Clement XI under the title of Bolla Unigenitus Dei Filius. He was the head of the conservative zelanti faction.

Before his death, he built the Biblioteca Fabroniana in Pistoia to house his donation of 8000 volumes. He died in Rome.
