= Jean-Baptiste-Charles-Marie de Beauvais =

French bishop

Jean-Baptiste-Charles-Marie de Beauvais (b. at Cherbourg, 17 October 1731; d. at Paris, 4 April 1790) was a French bishop of Senez.

== Life ==
Beauvais was born in Cherbourg on 17 October 1731, to a father who was an advocate in the Parlement of Paris, and became an abbé in the late 1750s.

Beauvais became known as one of the best preachers of the eighteenth century. His career was hindered by the radical political content of his sermons, which frequently criticized Louis XV and his court, as well as by Beauvais' own commoner background. Nevertheless, after the sermons he delivered to the court during Advent, 1768, and Lent, 1773, Beauvais was finally rewarded by being made Bishop of Senez.

In 1783, Beauvais resigned his bishopric and settled at Paris. In 1789, he was made a member of the States-General.

== Works ==
Beauvais was famous in his own day for his sermons openly criticizing the French aristocracy, including those delivered directly to Louis XV and his court. Taking up the mantle of the defender of the poor, Beauvais condemned the lifestyles of the wealthy, exhorting the royal family to exhibit greater personal virtue, practice chastity, and make appointments based on merit.

A collected volume of Beauvais' sermons were printed at Paris in 1806, prefaced by an account, written by the Abbé Boulogne, of the preacher and his discourses. Beauvais' most famous sermons include his funeral oration on Louis XV, and his panegyrics on St. Augustine and St. Louis.
