= Charles Joachim Colbert =

French bishop (1667–1738)

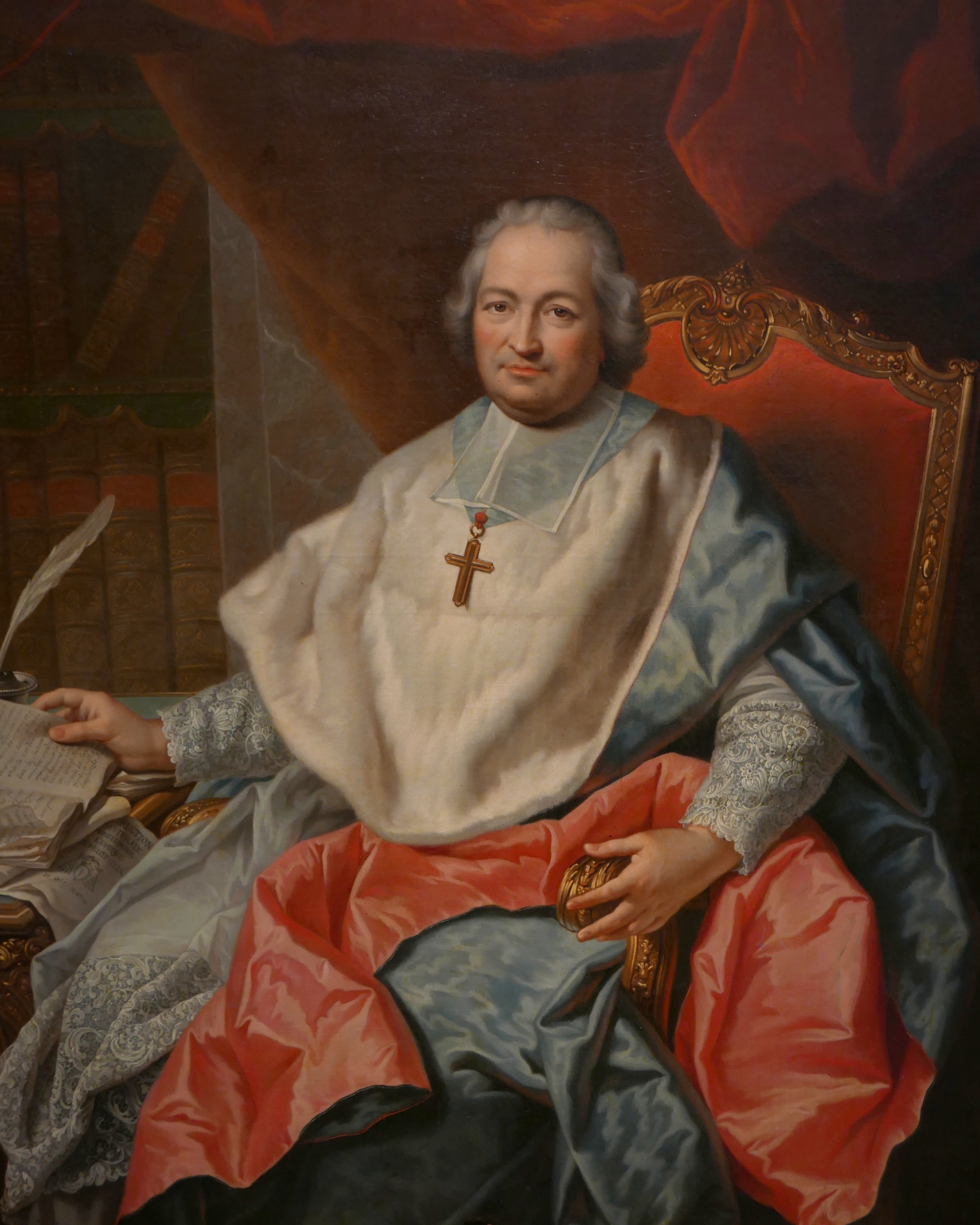
Portrait of Charles Joachim Colbert by Jean Raoux

Charles Joachim Colbert (11 June 1667 – 8 April 1738) was a bishop of Montpellier from 1697.

He was a son of Charles Colbert, marquis de Croissy and a nephew of Jean-Baptiste Colbert.
As an ardent Jansenist he had père François-Aimé Pouget edit the noted Catéchisme de Montpellier. His writings were condemned by Rome. He was also part of the 'Appelant' movement alongside Jean Soanen, Pierre de La Broue and Pierre de Langle, calling for a church council to discuss the papal bull Unigenitus.
