= Scala Regia (Vatican) =

Staircase designed by Gian Lorenzo Bernini in Vatican City

- Stairs
- English: Royal Staircase
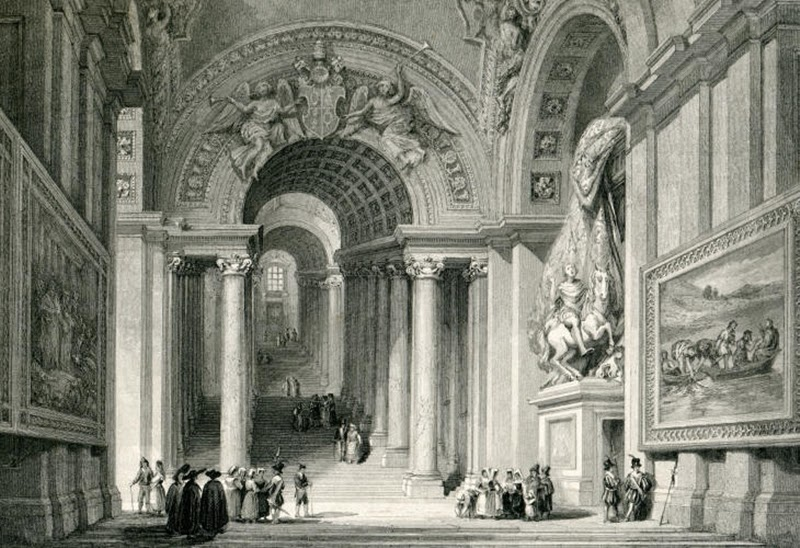
- The base of Scala Regia, viewed from the Portone di Bronzo. To the right is the equestrian statue of Constantine the Great; straight ahead is the coat of arms of Pope Alexander VII.
- Design: Gian Lorenzo Bernini
- Constructed: 16th century
- Location: Rome, Italy
- Interactive map of Scala Regia
- Coordinates: 41°54′10″N 12°27′18″E

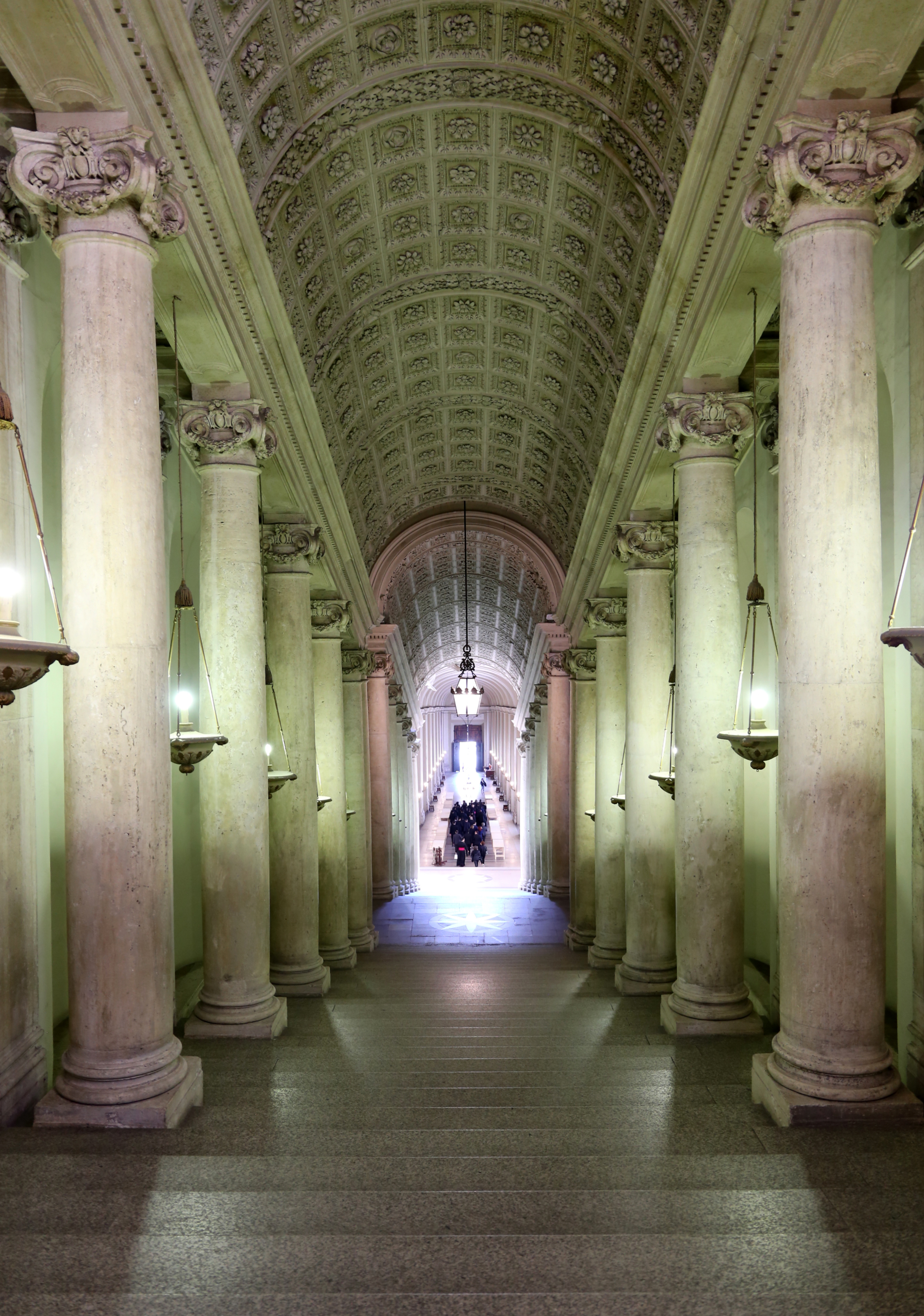
Scala Regia

Scala Regia (Note: Ecclesiastical Latin: [ˈskala ˈredʒi.a], Italian: [ˈskaːla ˈrɛːdʒa]; English: Royal Staircase) is a flight of steps in the Vatican City and is part of the formal entrance to the Vatican. It was designed by Gian Lorenzo Bernini.

The official entrance to the Apostolic Palace is the Portone di Bronzo at the north side of St Peter's Square. The door opens to the Scala Regia, which leads up to the Sala Regia, which in turn connects to the Sistine Chapel and the Pauline Chapel. Tourists are allowed to climb the staircase to enter the Sala Regia.

The Scala Regia was built by Antonio da Sangallo the Younger in the early 16th century and was restored by Gian Lorenzo Bernini from 1663 to 1666.

The site for the stairs, a comparatively narrow sliver of land between church and palace, is awkwardly shaped with irregular converging walls. Bernini used a number of typically theatrical, baroque effects in order to exalt this entry point into the Vatican. The staircase proper takes the form of a barrel-vaulted colonnade that necessarily becomes narrower at the end of the vista, exaggerating the distance. Above the arch at the beginning of this vista is the coat of arms of Alexander VII, flanked by two sculpted angels.

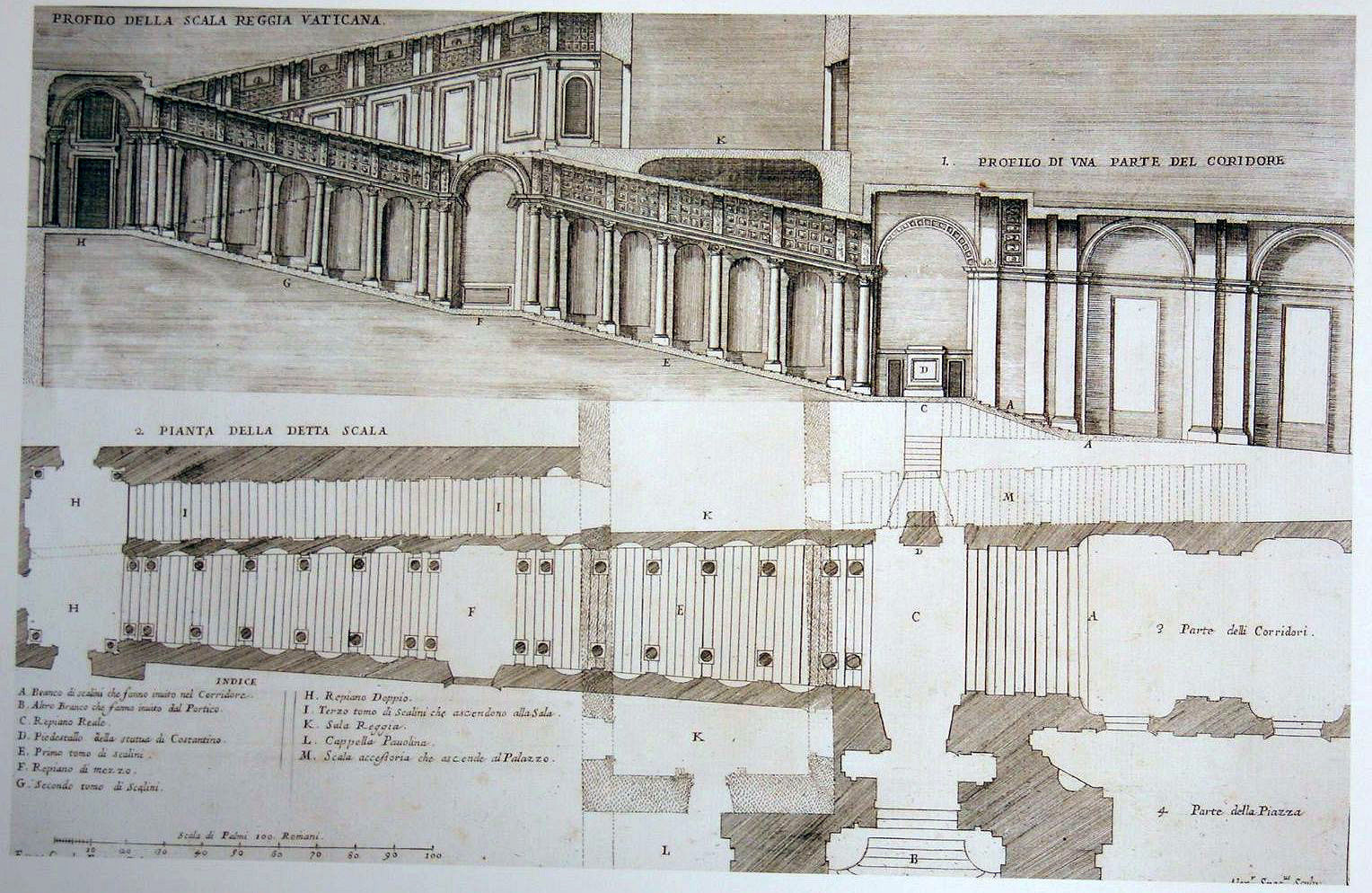
Plan of the Scala Regia

At the base of the stairs, Bernini placed his equestrian statue of the Roman emperor Constantine the Great. It is meant to display the event, before the Battle of the Milvian Bridge when at Saxa Rubra north of Rome along the Tiber, Constantine sees a vision of the cross with the words In Hoc Signo Vinces (In this sign, you will conquer). The phrase appears prominently placed as a motto on a ribbon unfurled with a passion cross to its left, beneath a window over the Scala Regia, adjacent to the statue of Constantine. Emperors and other monarchs, having paid respects to the Pope, descended the Scala Regia, and would observe the light shining down through the window, with the motto, reminiscent of Constantine's vision, and be reminded to follow the Cross.

In Bernini's statue of Constantine, he is awed and his horse rears, as Constantine realizes that he will win only with the power of the Christ. The moral of this story would not have been lost upon royal visitors to the pope, or for that matter, Cardinals accompanying a deceased pontiff's cortege, who are meant to see the leader of the church as the embodiment of the divine power that over-rules the kings of the world. This theme is often repeated in Vatican artworks such as Giulio Romano's fresco of The Battle of Milvian Bridge, located in the Sala di Costantino ("Hall of Constantine") as well as the marble relief in St. Peter's of Algardi's Fuga d'Attila.

Pope Clement XI later installed a statue of Charlemagne at the opposite end of the portico of St. Peter's Basilica, as a pendant to that of Constantine.

== See also ==
- List of works by Gian Lorenzo Bernini
- Index of Vatican City-related articles
