= Senez =

Senez Seneç (Occitan)
- Commune
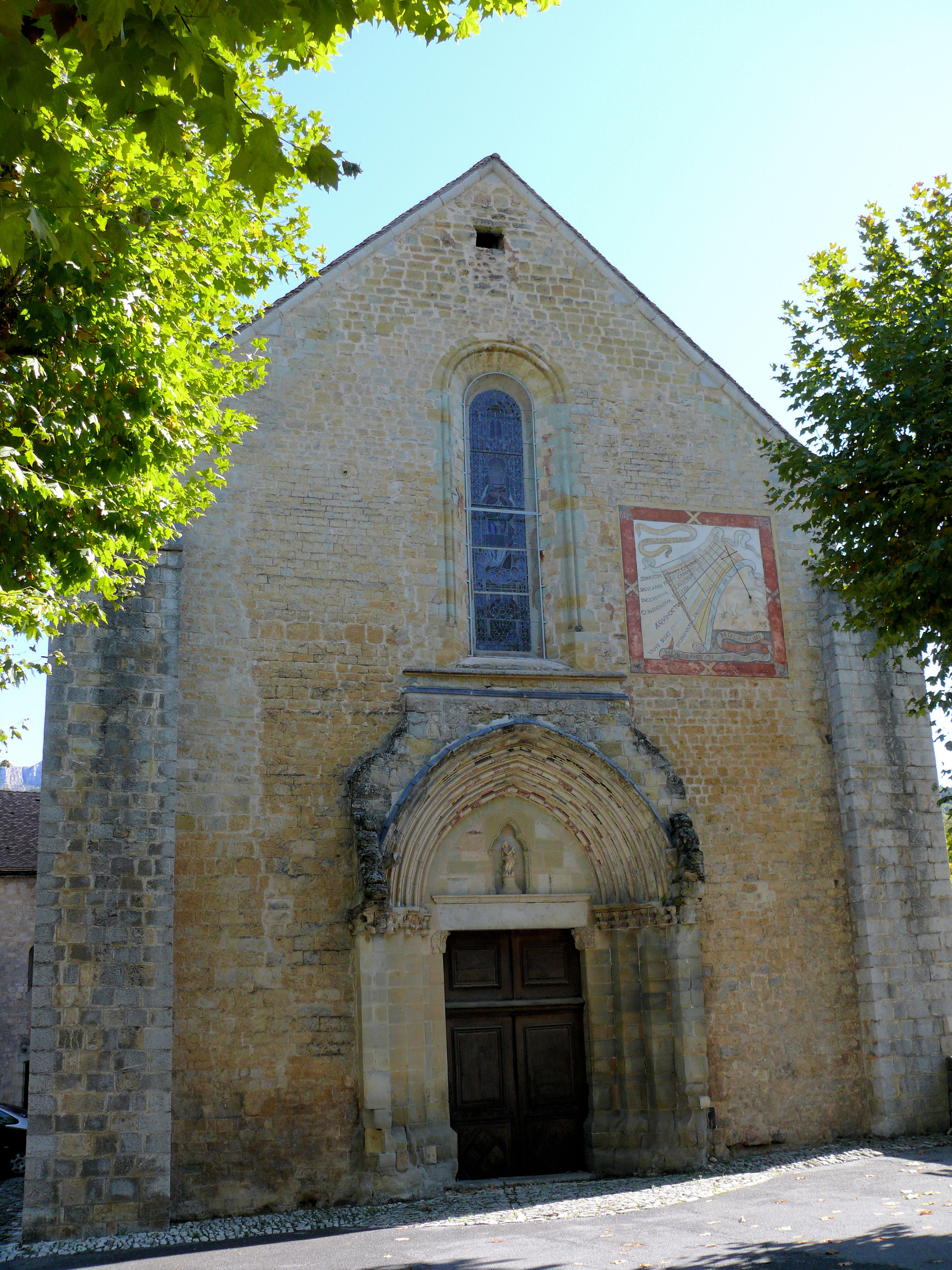
- The cathedral of Our Lady of the Assumption, in Senez

- Coat of arms
- Location of Senez
- Location within France Location within Provence-Alpes-Côte d'Azur
- Coordinates: 43°54′52″N 6°24′28″E
- Country: France
- Region: Provence-Alpes-Côte d'Azur
- Department: Alpes-de-Haute-Provence
- Arrondissement: Castellane
- Canton: Riez

Government
  - Mayor (2026–32): Gilles Durand
- Area^{1}: 70.27 km^{2} (27.13 sq mi)
- Elevation: 780 m (2,560 ft)
- Highest elevation: 1,720 m (5,640 ft)
- Lowest elevation: 748 m (2,454 ft)
- Population (2023): 154
  - Density: 2.19/km^{2} (5.68/sq mi)
- Time zone: UTC+01:00 (CET)
  - Summer (DST): UTC+02:00 (CEST)
- INSEE/Postal code: 04204 /04330
- ^{1} French Land Register data, which excludes lakes, ponds, glaciers > 1 km^{2} (0.386 sq mi or 247 acres) and river estuaries.

Senez (Occitan: Seneç) is a rural commune in the Alpes-de-Haute-Provence department in the southeastern Provence-Alpes-Côte d'Azur region in France.

== Ecclesiastical history ==
Marcellus I, the first known bishop of Senez, attended the Council of Agde in 506 CE; nevertheless, Senez must have been an episcopal city as early as 439 CE.

Jean IV Soanen, the Oratorian, noted for his opposition to the Bull "Unigenitus", was Bishop of Senez from 1696 until the time of his deposition in 1727.

By the Concordat of 1801, the diocese of Digne was made to include the two departments of the Hautes-Alpes and Basses Alpes, in addition to the former diocese of Digne, the archdiocese of Embrun, the dioceses of Gap, Sisteron, and Senez, a very considerable part of the diocese of Glandèves and diocese of Riez, and fourteen parishes in the Archdiocese of Aix and the Diocese of Apt.

In 1822 Gap was made an episcopal see and, thus divested of the department of the Hautes Alpes, the present diocese of Digne covers the territory formerly included in the dioceses of Digne, Senez, Glandèves, Riez, and Sisteron.

== Demographics ==
Historical population
Year	Pop.	±% p.a.
1968	182	—
1975	134	−4.28%
1982	153	+1.91%
1990	121	−2.89%
1999	145	+2.03%
2007	179	+2.67%
2012	162	−1.98%
2017	167	+0.61%
2023	154	−1.34%
Source: INSEE

== See also ==
- Senez Cathedral
- Communes of the Alpes-de-Haute-Provence department
