= Unigenitus =

Papal bull regarding Jansenism

Unigenitus Dei Filius Latin for 'Only-begotten Son of God' Apostolic constitution of Pope Clement XI
- Signature date: 8 September 1713
- Subject: Condemnation of Jansenism

Unigenitus (named for its Latin opening words Unigenitus Dei Filius, or 'Only-Begotten Son of God') is an apostolic constitution in the form of a papal bull promulgated by Pope Clement XI in 1713. It opened the final phase of the Jansenist controversy in France. Unigenitus censured 101 propositions of Pasquier Quesnel as:

false, captious, ill-sounding, offensive to pious ears, scandalous, pernicious, rash, injurious to the Church and its practices, contumelious to Church and State, seditious, impious, blasphemous, suspected and savouring of heresy, favouring heretics, heresy, and schism, erroneous, bordering on heresy, often condemned, heretical, and reviving various heresies, especially those contained in the famous propositions of Jansenius.

== Background ==
In 1671, Pasquier Quesnel had published a book entitled Abrégé de la morale de l'Evangile ('Morality of the Gospel, Abridged'). It contained the four Gospels in French, with short explanatory notes, serving as aids for meditation. The work was approved by the Bishop of Châlons-sur-Marne. Enlarged editions followed, containing an annotated French text of the complete New Testament, in 1678 and 1693–1694. This last edition was highly recommended by the new Bishop of Châlons, Louis Antoine de Noailles. While the first edition of the work contained only a few Jansenist points, its tendency became more apparent in the second edition, and in its complete form, as it appeared in 1693, it was – in the words of the 1912 Catholic Encyclopedia – "pervaded with practically all the errors of Jansenism".

Several bishops forbade it to be read, and Pope Clement XI condemned it in a brief on July 13, 1708, that was not accepted in France because its wording and its manner of publication were not in harmony with the accepted prerogatives of the Gallican church. Noailles, who had become Archbishop of Paris and cardinal meanwhile, and who in 1702 discarded a relic that had long been venerated at Châlons as the umbilical cord of Jesus, was not prepared to withdraw the approbation which he had given to the book, and Jansenism again raised its head.

== Production ==
To put an end to this situation several bishops, supported by Louis XIV himself, asked the Pope to issue a bull in place of the unacceptable brief. The Bull would have to avoid every expression contrary to the "Gallican Liberties" and to be submitted to the French government before publication. To avoid further scandal, Clement yielded to these humiliating conditions, and in February 1712, appointed a special congregation of cardinals and theologians to cull from the work of Quesnel such propositions as were deserving of ecclesiastical censure. The most influential member of this congregation was Cardinal Agostino Fabroni.

The bull, which was produced with the contribution of a committee including Cardinal Fabroni and Gregorio Selleri, lector at the College of Saint Thomas, rejected 101 propositions from the Réflexions morales of Quesnel as heretical, and as reviving propositions already condemned in the writings of Jansen.

It took the congregation eighteen months to complete its task, the result of which was published as the Bull Unigenitus at Rome on 8 September 1713.

== Content ==
The bull begins with Christ's warning against false prophets, especially such as "secretly spread evil doctrines under the guise of piety and introduce ruinous sects under the image of sanctity".

It then lists 101 condemned propositions which are taken verbatim from the last edition of Quesnel's work, with the Bible verses the Quesnel used to justify the proposition. Some of the condemned propositions include: grace works with omnipotence and is irresistible; without grace man can only commit sin; Christ died for the elect only; every love that is not supernatural is evil; without supernatural love there can be no hope in God, no obedience to His law, no good work, no prayer, no merit, no religion; the prayer of the sinner and his other good acts performed out of fear of punishment are only new sins; the Church comprises only the just and the elect; the reading of the Bible is for all; sacramental absolution should be postponed till after satisfaction; the chief pastors can exercise the Church's power of excommunication only with the consent, at least presumed, of the whole body of the Church; unjust excommunication does not exclude the excommunicated from union with the Church.

The bull also condemns such things as that the reading of Sacred Scripture is for all, that it is useful and necessary at all times, in all places, and for every kind of person, to study and to know the spirit, the piety, and the mysteries of Sacred Scripture, and that its sacred obscurity is no reason for the laity to dispense themselves from reading it, and that doing so is harmful. (79–81, 83–86)

The bull finds fault with many other statements in the book of Quesnel, without, however, specifying them, and, in particular, with the translation of the New Testament, which, as the Bull reads, has been censurably altered (Latin: damnabiliter vitiatum) and is in many ways similar to a previously condemned French translation.

== Reception ==
According to John McManners, "The complicated diplomatic manoeuvring leading to its promulgation was prompted by the Jesuits and their sympathizers, enemies of Cardinal Noailles, and by the aged King Louis XIV, which wished to destroy the Jansenists as ‘a republican party in Church and State’, while upholding the independence of the Gallican Church".

Louis XIV received the Bull at Fontainebleau on 24 September 1713, and sent a copy to Noailles, who, probably before receiving it, had revoked, on September 28, his approbation of the "Moral Reflections" given in 1695. The king also convoked the French clergy to convene at Paris to accept the bull.

At the first session, Noailles appointed a committee presided over by Cardinal Louis Constantin de Rohan of Strasburg to decide upon the most suitable manner of accepting the Bull. Noailles's attempts to prevent an unconditional acceptance proved fruitless and the bull was accepted and officially registered. But a pastoral instruction of Noailles forbade his priests under pain of suspension to accept the Bull without his authorization; that was condemned by Rome.

The bishops of France were divided. The Pope felt that his authority was threatened and intended to summon Noailles before the Curia and, if needs be, dismiss him from the cardinalate. But the king and his councillors, seeing in this mode of procedure a trespass upon the "Gallican Liberties", proposed instead the convocation of a national council which would judge and pass sentence upon Noailles and his faction.

The Pope did not relish the idea of convoking a national council, which might unnecessarily protract the quarrel and endanger the papal authority. He, however, drew up two briefs, the one demanding the unconditional acceptance of the bull by Louis Antoine de Noailles within fifteen days, on pain of turning in the red hat (sign of his rank as cardinal) and incurring canonical punishment, the other more paternally pointing out the gravity of the cardinal's offence. Both briefs were put in the hand of the king, with the request to deliver the less severe text should there be a well-founded hope of the cardinal's speedy submission. In fact, Noailles gave no hope of submission, while, on the other, the more severe of the Briefs was rejected by the king as subversive of the "Gallican Liberties". Louis XIV, therefore, again pressed for the convocation of a national council, but died September 1, 1715, before it could be convened.

Philippe II of Orléans, now Regent of France, favoured the opponents of the Bull. The Sorbonne passed a resolution on January 4, 1716, annulling its previous registration of the Bull, and twenty-two Sorbonnists who protested were removed from the faculty. The Universities of Nantes and Rheims now also rejected the Bull. In consequence on November 1 Clement XI withdrew from the Sorbonne all the papal privileges which it possessed and attempted to deprive it of the power of conferring academic degrees.

Clement XI had sent two Briefs to France on May 1, 1716. One, addressed to the regent, severely reproved him for favouring the opponents of the Bull; the other, addressed to the opposition, threatened to deprive Noailles of the purple, and to proceed canonically against all who would not accept the Bull within two months. These Briefs were not accepted by the regent because their text had not been previously submitted to his ministers. But he sent to Rome, Chevalier, the Jansenist Vicar-General of Meaux whom the Pope did not, however, admit to his presence, when it became known that his sole purpose was to wrest the admission from Clement XI that the Bull was obscure and required an explanation. In a consistory held on June 27, 1716, the Pope delivered a passionate allocution, lasting three hours, in which he informed the cardinals of the treatment which the Bull had received in France, and expressed his purpose of divesting Noailles of the cardinalate. The following November he sent two new Briefs to France, one to the regent, whose co-operation he asked in suppressing the opposition to the Bull; the other to the acceptants, whom he warned against the intrigues of the recalcitrants, and requested to exhort their erring brethren to give up their resistance.

On March 1, 1717, four bishops (Soanen of Senez, de La Broue of Mirepoix, Colbert of Montpellier and Delangle of Boulogne) drew up an appeal from the Bull to a general council, thus founding the party hereafter known as the "appellants". Between March 5 and May 13, they were joined by the faculties of the Sorbonne, of Rheims, and Nantes; likewise by the Bishops of Verdun, Pamiers, Châlons, Condom, Agen and St. Malo, and Auxerre; and more than a year later by the Bishops of Laon, Bayonne and Angoulême.

Though a personal letter of the Pope, dated March 25, and a joint letter of the cardinals at Rome urgently implored Noailles to submit, he also drew up an appeal on April 3, "from the pope manifestly mistaken, and from the Constitution Unigenitus, in virtue of the decrees of the Councils of Constance and Basle, to the Pope better informed and to a general council to be held without constraint and in a safe place". He did not, however, publish his appeal for the present, but deposited it in the archives of the officialité of Paris. On May 6, he wrote a long letter to the Pope, in which he endeavours to justify his position and that of his adherents. A few months later his appeal from the Bull was published. The appellants were soon joined by many priests and religious, especially from the Dioceses of Paris and Rheims. To swell the list of appellants the names of laymen and even laywomen were accepted. The number of appellants is said to have reached 1,800 to 2,000, pitifully small for the approximately 1,500,000 livres ($300,000) distributed as bribes.

On March 8, 1718, appeared a Decree of the Inquisition, approved by Clement XI, which condemned the appeal of the four bishops as schismatic and heretical, and that of Noailles as schismatic and approaching to heresy. Since they did not withdraw their appeal within a reasonable time, the Pope issued the Bull "Pastoralis officii" on August 28, 1718, excommunicating all that refused to accept the Bull Unigenitus. But they appealed also from this second Bull. Noailles finally made an ambiguous submission on 13 March 1720, by signing an explanation of the Bull Unigenitus, drawn up by order of the French secretary of State, Guillaume Cardinal Dubois, and, later, approved by ninety-five bishops.

After much pressure from the king of France and the bishops, Noailles made public this ambiguous acceptance of the Bull in his pastoral instruction of November 18, 1720. But this did not satisfy Clement XI, who required an unconditional acceptance. After the death of Clement XI, March 19, 1721, the appellants continued in their obstinacy during the pontificates of Innocent XIII (1721–1724) and Benedict XIII (1724–1730). Noailles, the soul of the opposition, finally made a sincere and unconditional submission on October 11, 1728, and died soon after (May 2, 1729). The Apostolic See, in concerted action with the new Archbishop of Paris, Vintimille, and the French Government, gradually brought about the submission of most of the appellants.

== See also ==
- Jansenism and Jansenism § Legacy
- Formulary controversy
- The bull and Cardinal de Noailles's intransigent response are parodied in Claude Prosper Jolyot de Crébillon's second novel L'Ecumoire (The Skimmer, 1734).
