= Pasquier Quesnel =

French Jansenist theologian

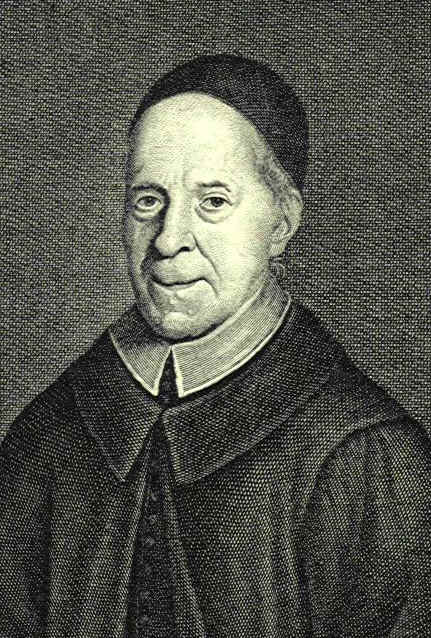
Pasquier Quesnel.

Pasquier Quesnel, CO (French pronunciation: [pa(s)kje kenɛl]; 14 July 1634 – 2 December 1719) was a French Jansenist theologian.

== Life ==
Quesnel was born in Paris and graduated from the Sorbonne with distinction in 1653. He joined the French Oratory in 1657, where he soon became prominent. He took a leading part in scholarly controversy, for example against Joseph Anthelmi.

His Jansenist sympathies led to his banishment from Paris in 1681, following the formulary controversy. He took refuge with the friendly Cardinal Coislin, bishop of Orléans. Four years later, anticipating persecution, he fled to Brussels and resided with Antoine Arnauld.

He remained there until 1703, when he was arrested by order of the archbishop of Mechelen. After a three month imprisonment, he made a dramatic escape and settled at Amsterdam, where he spent the remainder of his life. After Antoine Arnauld's death in 1694, Quesnel was generally regarded as the leader of the Jansenist party. His Réflexions morales sur le Nouveau Testament (transl. Moral reflections on the New Testament) played almost as large a part in its literature as Jansen's Augustinus itself.

Quesnel's book was a devotional commentary on the New Testament, in which he explained the aims and ideals of the Jansenist party better than any earlier writer. As such, it became the chief object of Jesuit attack. It appeared in many forms and under various titles, the original germ going back as far as 1668; the first complete edition was published in 1692.

The papal bull Unigenitus, in which 101 sentences from the Réflexions morales were condemned as heretical, was obtained from Clement XI on 8 September 1713. Quesnel died at Amsterdam in 1719. Unigenitus marked the end of Catholic toleration of Jansenist doctrine.
