= Périer =

Périer may refer to:

- Le Périer, a town and commune in the Isère département, in France

== People with the surname ==
- Albert James Perier (1870–1964) Australian photographer
- Antoine-Alexis Perier de Salvert (1691–1759) French naval officer
- Bonaventure des Périers (c. 1501–1544), French author
- Casimir Pierre Périer (1777–1832), French entrepreneur and politician
- Claude Perier (1742–1801), wealthy bourgeois, father of Casimir Pierre Perier, owner of Vizille chateau
- Étienne Perier (governor), the fifth governor of the Louisiana colony
- Étienne Périer (director) (1931–2020), Belgian film director
- Florin Périer, husband of Blaise Pascal's elder sister Gilberte
- François Périer (1919–2002), French actor
- Gilberte Périer (1620–1687), sister and biographer of Blaise Pascal
- Jean-Marie Périer (born 1940), French photographer
- Marguerite Périer (1646–1733), French nun and follower of Jansenism, niece of Blaise Pascal
- René de Saint-Périer (1877–1950), French prehistorian, discoverer of the Venus of Lespugue in 1922

== See also ==
- Casimir-Perier (surname)
- Périers (disambiguation), various meanings, including use as a surname
- Perrier (disambiguation)
