= Jacqueline Pascal =

French poet and nun (1625–1661)

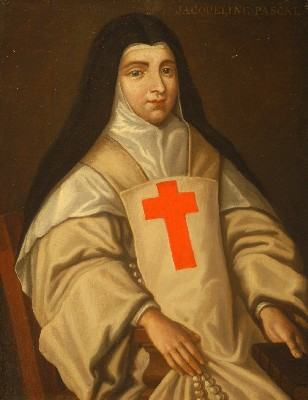
Jacqueline Pascal

Jacqueline Pascal (October 5, 1625 – October 4, 1661) was a French poet and Jansenist nun. The sister of Gilberte Périer and Blaise Pascal, she began writing poetry at a young age and gained recognition for it. As an adult, she became a Jansenist and entered the Port-Royal abbey as a nun.

== Biography ==
=== Early life ===
Jacqueline Pascal (Note: Biographer Frédéric Delforge says the name on her baptismal certificate was Jacquette, but her family called her Jacqueline.) was born on October 5, 1625 in Clermont, France to Étienne Pascal and Antoinette Begon. She had two older siblings, Gilberte Périer and Blaise Pascal, as well as two older siblings who died in infancy. She was baptized on October 10, 1625 into a Roman Catholic family. Antoinette died in 1626, and Étienne, a lawyer, decided to educate his children at home. The family lived in Clermont for the first years of Jacqueline's life, before moving to Paris in 1631. At the age of seven, Gilberte tried to teach Jacqueline how to read, which Jacqueline expressed disinterest in. When Gilberte introduced her to poetry, Jacqueline began reading and writing extensively. In 1636, she and two friends, also young girls, wrote and performed in a five-act play. After writing a poem for Anne of Austria, Jacqueline was summoned to her court to demonstrate her artistic abilities, where she wrote poems on demand for the ladies of the court. A collection of her work, Poetry of the Young Pascal, was published in 1638 by a family friend. During this time, the Pascal family was well-connected in Parisian society. Later in 1638, her poetry took on more religious themes, and she became ill with smallpox. She recovered, but had life-long scarring from it.

Following protests in Paris by stockholders in 1639, Étienne fled Paris after an order for his arrest was issued. Jacqueline petitioned Cardinal Richelieu to pardon him. Richelieu acquiesced and the family moved to Normandy when Étienne was appointed as a tax collector in Rouen. While there, Jacqueline composed On the Conception of the Virgin, which won the 1640 Prix de la Tour literary award. Jacqueline continued to study history, philosophy, and poetry during this time. In 1646, Étienne was injured in a fall and was treated by two Jansenists who proselytized to the family. Jacqueline converted, as did her father and siblings. Jacqueline was inspired by the works of the abbé de Saint-Cyran and read numerous Jansenist texts. Their shared religious belief brought Jacqueline and Blaise closer together, and she cared for him during his periods of illness. While visiting Paris in 1647, she began attending the Port-Royal de Paris, a Jansenist stronghold, and Jacqueline decided she wished to become a nun. Étienne objected to this, and Jacqueline could only visit Port-Royal in secret. While living with her sister in Auvergne to avoid civil unrest in Paris, Jacqueline practiced a monastic lifestyle in preparation for entering Port-Royal, secluding herself from her family, making items for the poor, and practicing mortification. During this time, she communicated extensively with Port-Royal, writing to the abbess Agnès Arnauld and Antoine Singlin, the chaplain. Mother Agnès expressed concern at Jacqueline's strict austerity and agitation that she had not yet joined the convent.

=== Religious life ===
She returned to Paris in 1650, and her father died in 1651; before his death he relented and did not oppose Jacqueline's entry into Port-Royal. Étienne divided his will equally among his three children, which was not customary for the time. She entered Port-Royal as a novice on May 26, 1652, despite tensions with her family over her choice, and was given the name Soeur Jacqueline de Sainte-Euphémie. Before her profession as a nun in 1653, Jacqueline intended to use her entire inheritance as a dowry for her admission to Port-Royal; the convent did not require any dowry but would have expected one of a woman of her financial means. Her siblings strongly objected to this and threatened legal action. During her time in the novitiate, Jacqueline struggled with detaching herself from her family and their financial issues. Two days before her profession, they reached an agreement and Blaise donated a portion of her inheritance to the convent, as nuns at the time were considered civially dead.

Jacqueline's profession as a nun occurred on June 5, 1653. She was appointed headmistress of the Port-Royal convent school immediately after her profession. In late 1654, Blaise underwent a religious transformation, which pleased Jacqueline. Jacqueline's niece, Marguerite Périer, visited Port-Royal in 1656 while suffering from a "lacrimal fistula" and was seemingly miraculously cured after a religious artifact was pressed against her eye. Jacqueline provided attestation of this healing and wrote a verse to memorialize it. Antoine Singlin, the chaplain and Jacqueline's spiritual advisor, directed her to write Règlements pour les Enfants (transl. A Rule for Children) in 1657, a summary of her recommendations for education as a result of her teaching experience at the convent. Jacqueline was appointed subprioress of the Port-Royal de Paris in 1659, and subprioress of the Port-Royal des Champs in 1660.

Jansenism was controversial at the time, and was persecuted by the Catholic Church and French government. Several papal bulls had been issued condemning Jansenism and French leaders campaigned against Port-Royal in the 1650s. In 1661, Louis XIV condemned Jansenism and appointed a new chaplain of Port-Royal after expelling all students and novices. The Port-Royal nuns were ordered to sign a formulary in June disclaiming Jansenism, which Jacqueline initially refused to do. A few days after the order, she was counseled and pressured into signing the official Jansenist statement. Shortly after, she experienced a brief and unknown illness, and died October 4, 1661. She was buried in the nun's cemetery at Port-Royal des Champs. After her death, she was claimed as the protomartyr of the Jansenist movement by its adherents.

== Writing ==
Pascal wrote extensively throughout her life, both poetry and letters. Her oldest surviving poetry dates to 1637; any of her earlier verses were not preserved. Some of her poetry was published in a 1908 anthology by Alphonse Séché.

Gilberte Périer's letters were preserved after her death and published in 1845 by Armand-Prosper Faugère. The collection of letters contains many letters between Pascal and Périer. A similar collection of letters written by Pascal were compiled in Œuvres complètes de Blaise Pascal, a collection of letters by her brother Blaise, published by Jean Mesnard.

After entering Port-Royal, Pascal ceased writing poetry, with two exceptions: a translation of a hymn and a poem to celebrate the healing of Marguerite Périer. In 1651, she wrote a meditation on the death of Jesus, Le Mystère de la Mort de Notre-Seigneur Jésus-Christ (transl. On the Mystery of the Death of Our Lord Jesus Christ). Her educational treatise, A Rule for Children, was first published in 1655 in the Netherlands. It was written from her experience teaching students at Port-Royal, and recommended strict asceticism in line with Jansenist thought. After the death of Angélique Arnauld in 1661, Pascal wrote a memoir dedicated to her.
