= Carrosses à cinq sols =

Early public transport service

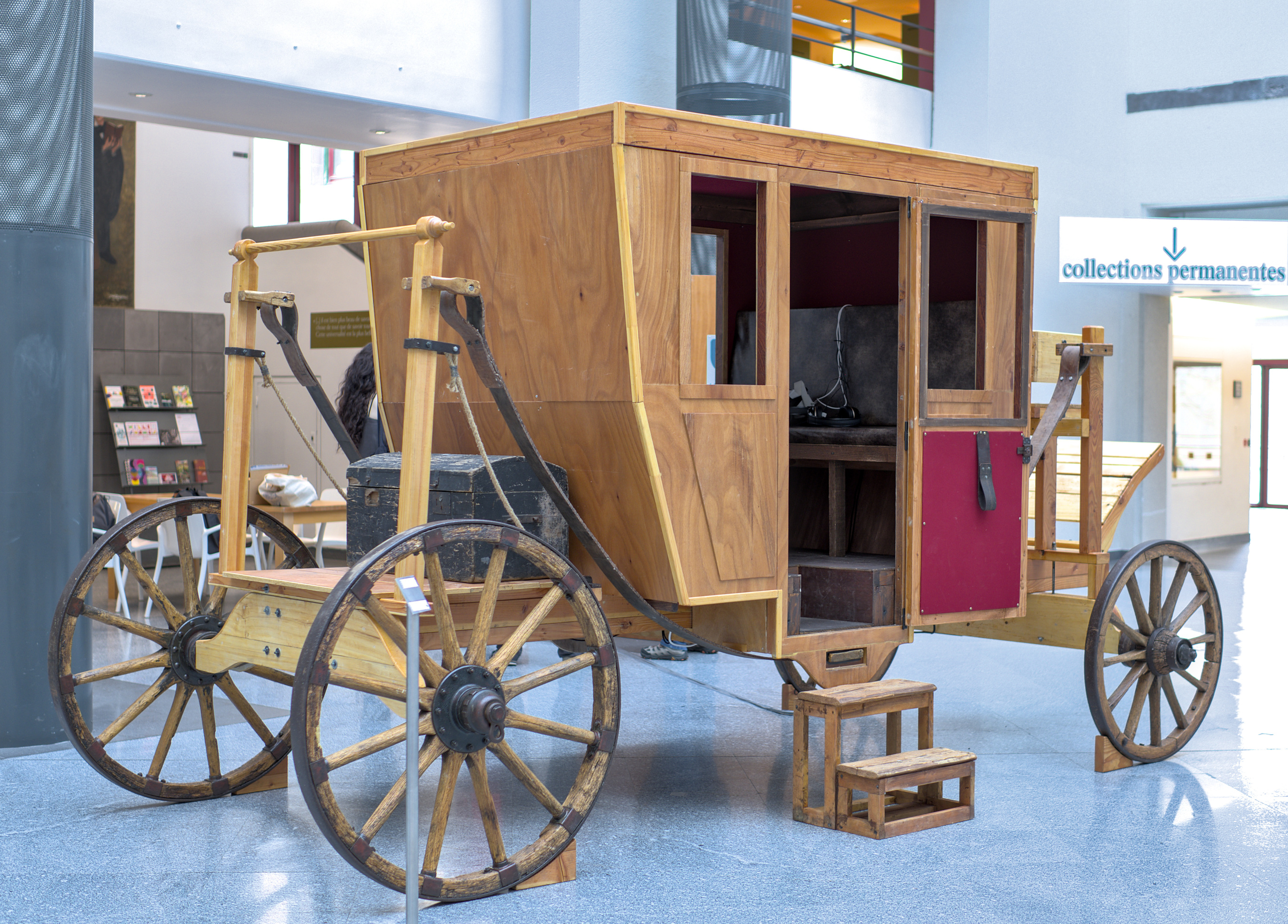
- Replica coach in the Musée d'art Roger-Quilliot, Clermont-Ferrand

Overview
- Area served: Paris
- Transit type: Horse-drawn omnibus
- Number of lines: 5

Operation
- Began operation: March 18, 1662
- Ended operation: c. 1677

The carrosses à cinq sols (English: five-sol coaches) was the first modern form of public transport in the world, developed by mathematician and philosopher Blaise Pascal and operated in Paris in the 1660s.

== History ==
Paris in the era of Louis XIV was one of the world's most populous cities, containing more than 500,000 residents in 22,000 residences, 500 major roads, 100 public squares, and 9 bridges. The narrow Parisian road network was created during the medieval times, and did not make the establishment of public transportation attractive.

In a corporation founded in November 1661 on the initiative of Blaise Pascal, with the participation of the Duke of Roannez (governor and lieutenant-general of the province of Poitou), the Marquis de Sourches (knight of the king's orders and Grand Provost of the Hotel), and the Marquis de Crenan, the entrepreneurs presented a request to establish an operation for "carriages which would always make the same journeys...and would always leave at scheduled times, without waiting to be filled up, even empty, without the people that enjoy that commodity having to pay for the empty seats".

The system of public coaches was approved and instituted by a judgement of the King's Counsel on 19 January 1662, and signed by Louis XIV. The letters patent granted them the exclusive right of operating such a service. After the first trials starting 26 February, five routes were progressively started from 18 March 1662, linking multiple historical quarters of Paris. From its inception, the new service was received positively.

Against the wishes of the King, the Parlement of Paris barred the commoners (soldiers, pages, liverymen, and laborers) from riding in the carriages "to assure the greater comfort and freedom of the bourgeois and meritous classes". These "safety" measures, along with others such as a police ordinance that threatened "whipping and greater penalties" for those who interfered with proper operation on the service, and a fare increase from five to six French sols, eventually caused public opinion to turn against the service, causing the enterprise's profitability to decline.

According to Marc Gaillard, the service ran until 1677. Though the precise fate of the carrosses à cinq sols is not documented by any contemporary sources, certain historians suggest that the service disappeared only a few years after the parlement's restrictive measures entered effect. The franchise for the service was recorded as having been transferred to the Sieur de Givry, although it does not confirm whether a service was actually running at the time.

== Operations and routes ==
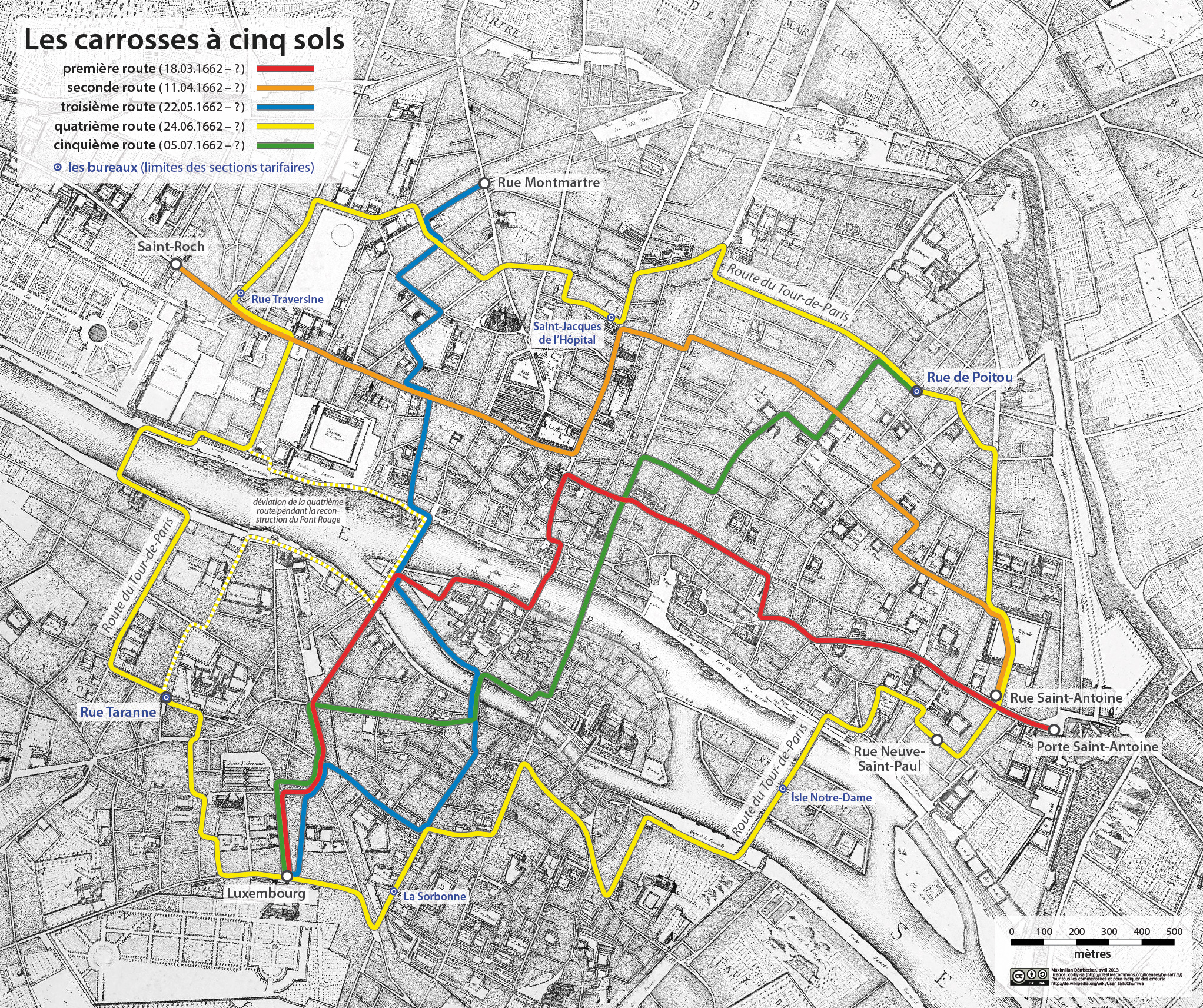
Network map of the carrosses à cinq sols

The coaches used for the service were pulled by four horses and were staffed by a coachman and a footman. Each employee wore a blue jersey with the coat of arms of the king and of the city of Paris. The vehicles themselves, which carried eight passengers, only stopped on their routes when passengers requested to board or alight at stops.

The first line ran from the Porte Saint-Antoine to Luxembourg Palace via the Pont au Change, the Pont Neuf, and Rue Dauphine. The second line, which linked Rue Saint Antoine and Rue Saint-Denis, began operation on 11 April. The third route, which linked Luxembourg Palace with Rue Montmartre via the Pont Saint-Michel, began operation on 2 May. The fourth route, beginning service on 24 June, contained two new innovations: a circular route and distance-based fares, which were implemented by dividing the circular route into six sections; riders paid five sols when they passed two sections. The fifth route, which connected Luxembourg Palace and Rue de Poitou, started operation on 5 July 1662.

== Legacy ==
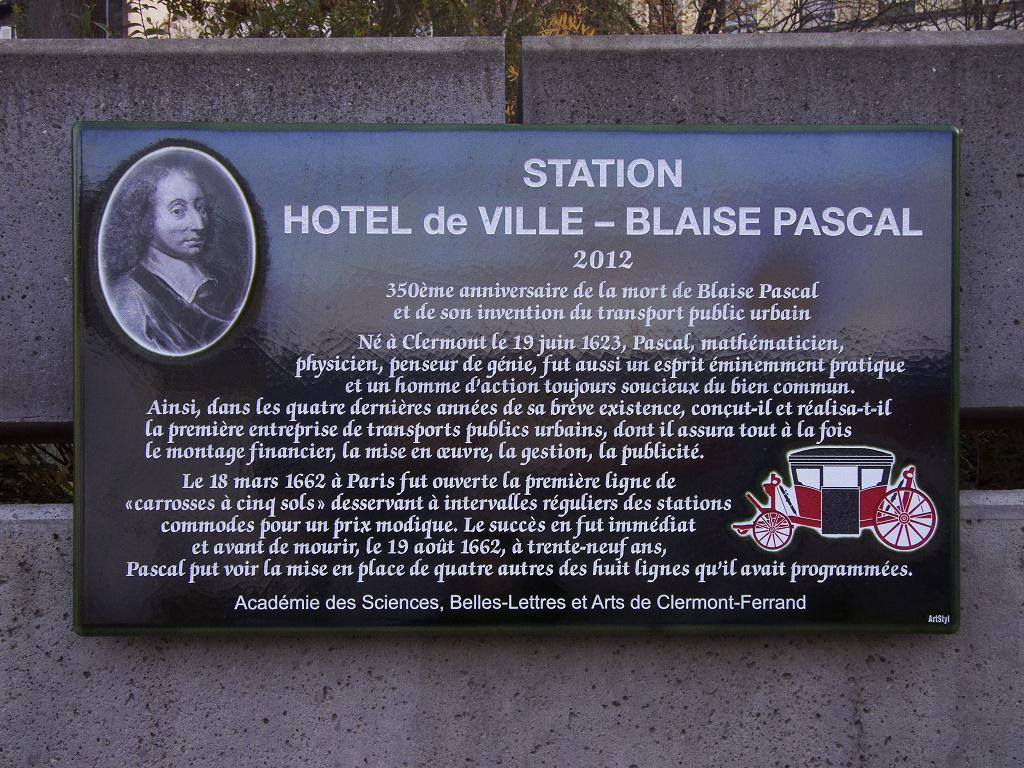
Commemorative plaque for the 350th anniversary of the launch of the carrosses à cinq sols in Paris; this plaque is located in Clermont-Ferrand, the birthplace of Blaise Pascal.

The carrosses à cinq sols exhibited the characteristics of a modern public transit system. It had consistent routes, fixed schedules with regular departures (7½ minutes on the first line), and fares that varied based on distance. However, the social hierarchy of France during this period, coupled with the tendency for residents to live close to where they worked, were factors that significantly reduced demand for the service. The demand for a public transportation service would diminish for another 150 years until the omnibus, the first method of public transport since the carrosses à cinq sols, was introduced in 1823.

== See also ==
- Fiacre (carriage)
- Hackney coach
- Stagecoach
