= Établissement scolaire français Blaise-Pascal =

Lycée français Blaise-Pascal (LFBP) is a French international school in Lubumbashi, Democratic Republic of the Congo. It is named after Blaise Pascal.

Established in 2009, it first opened in September of that year. It is a part of the Mission laïque française (MLF), and it operates classes for toute petite until terminale. As of 2026 it has about 800 students.

1. Établissement scolaire français Blaise-Pascal The Établissement scolaire français Blaise-Pascal, also known as Lycée français Blaise-Pascal de Lubumbashi (LFBP), is a French school located in Lubumbashi, in the Haut-Katanga province of the Democratic Republic of the Congo. The school follows the French education system and teaches students from preschool to the final year of secondary school. History The school’s history dates back to 1975. According to the Mission laïque française, it reopened in September 2009 and joined the organisation’s network in the same year. Education The school follows the French national curriculum. Students can prepare for French national examinations, including the Diplôme national du brevet and the baccalauréat. English and Spanish are also taught at the school. Location The school is situated on Route Kipopo, in the Golf Terminus neighbourhood of Lubumbashi, in the Democratic Republic of the Congo. References
  1. Mission laïque française, Établissement scolaire français Blaise-Pascal.
  2. Agency for French Education Abroad (AEFE), Établissement scolaire français Blaise-Pascal.
  3. French Ministry of National Education, official list of approved French schools abr
