= Gilberte Périer =

French biographer, sister of Blaise Pascal

Françoise Gilberte Périer
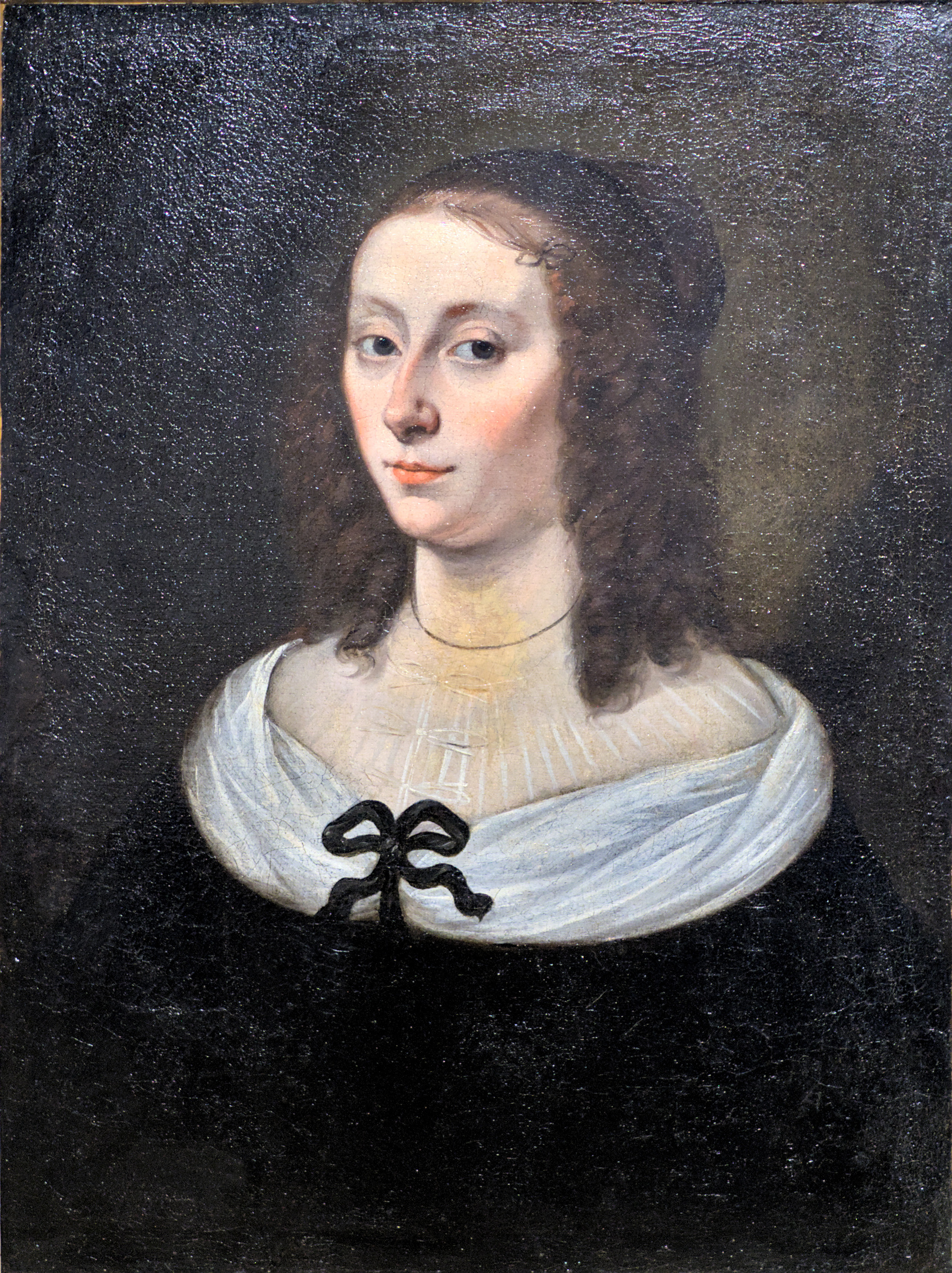
- Portrait of Gilberte Périer, Mandet Museum, Riom, France
- Born: Françoise Gilberte Pascal; 1 January 1620; Clermont-Ferrand, France
- Died: 25 April 1687 (aged 67); Paris, France
- Occupation: Biographer
- Known for: Pensées de Pascal
- Children: 6
- Father: Étienne Pascal

Françoise Gilberte Périer (1 January 1620 – 25 April 1687) was a French biographer and the older sister of Blaise Pascal whose biography she wrote.

== Biography ==
Françoise Gilberte Pascal was the eldest of three surviving children born to mathematician Étienne Pascal (1588–1651) and his wife Antoinette Pascal, nee Bégon (1596–1626). Her paternal grandfather was Martin Pascal, treasurer of France.

When Gilberte's mother died in 1626, her father moved the family to Paris and employed a governess, Louise Delfault, to bring up his children. However, Étienne chose to educate them himself. In Paris, Gilberte ran her father's household for years before following him to a new position in Rouen.

There, in June 1641, Gilberte married Florin Périer (1605–1672), a lawyer at the Supreme Tax Court in Clermont-Ferrand. He was not only a colleague of her father Étienne, but he was also her cousin. Her marriage produced four daughters (Marguerite Périer (1646–1733), Jacqueline (1644–1696), Marie (1647–1649) and Louise (1651–1713)) and two sons (Blaise (1653–1684) and Étienne (1642–1680)).

In 1646, like her husband, she had a religious conversion to Jansenism, a separatist movement in Roman Catholicism, and sent her children to Port-Royal Abbey, Paris to be educated. Increasingly, Gilberte withdrew from public life and later chose to live in solitude. Her religiosity was, however, of a gentler nature than that of her better-known younger sister, Jacqueline Pascal.

Gilberte was exceptionally well educated, studied philosophy and theology, was known for her eloquence and spoke several languages. Pascal made her his executor, and in 1670 she published the Pensées de Pascal (Thoughts of Pascal). However, despite their efforts, the text was not printed unchanged. In 1663 she published biographies of Pascal and her sister, Jacqueline. Gilberte also helped Pascal prepare his Apologie de la religion chrétienne (Apology of the Christian Religion) from which he drew the Pensées.
