= Étienne Pascal =

French tax officer and mathematician

- Born: 2 May 1588; Clermont-Ferrand, Province of Auvergne, France
- Died: 24 September 1651 (aged 63); Paris, France
- Education: Paris (law degree in 1610)
- Known for: Pascal's limaçon
- Spouse: Antoinette Begon
- Children: Gilberte Périer, Blaise Pascal, Jacqueline Pascal
- Scientific career
- Fields: Tax officer, amateur mathematician

Étienne Pascal (French: [etjɛn paskal]; 2 May 1588 – 24 September 1651) was a French chief tax officer and the father of Blaise Pascal (1623–1662).

== Biography ==
Pascal was born in Clermont to Martin Pascal, the treasurer of France, and Marguerite Pascal de Mons. He had three daughters, two of whom survived past childhood: Gilberte (1620–1687) and Jacqueline (1625–1661). His wife Antoinette Begon died in 1626.

He was a tax official, lawyer, and a wealthy member of the petite noblesse, who also had an interest in science and mathematics. He was trained in the law at Paris and received his law degree in 1610. That year, he returned to Clermont and purchased the post of counsellor for Bas-Auvergne, the area surrounding Clermont.

In 1631, five years after his wife's death, Pascal moved with his children to Paris. They hired Louise Delfault, a maid who eventually became an instrumental member of the family. Pascal, who never remarried, decided to home-educate his children, who showed extraordinary intellectual ability, particularly his son Blaise.

Pascal served on a scientific committee (whose members included Pierre Hérigone and Claude Mydorge) to determine whether Jean-Baptiste Morin's scheme for determining longitude from the Moon's motion was practical.

The limaçon was first studied and named by Pascal, and so this mathematical curve is often called Pascal's limaçon.

Pascal died in Paris.
