= Périers =

Périers or Perrières is the name or part of the name of several communes in France:

- Périers, Manche, in the Manche département
- Périers-en-Auge, in the Calvados département
- Périers-sur-le-Dan, in the Calvados département
- Perrières, in the Calvados département
