= Casimir-Perier (surname) =

Casimir-Perier is a surname. Notable people with the surname include:

- Jean Casimir-Perier (1847–1907), French politician, fifth president of the French Third Republic (grandson of Casimir Pierre Perier)
- Auguste Casimir-Perier (1811–1876), French diplomat, son of Casimir Pierre Perier
