= Marguerite Périer =

French nun, niece of Blaise Pascal

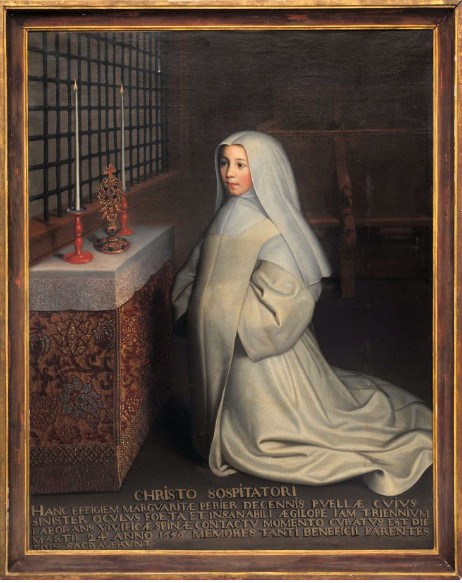
- Ex-voto portrait of Marguerite Périer attributed to François Quesnel
- Born: 6 April 1646; Clermont-Ferrand, France
- Died: 14 April 1733 (aged 87); Clermont-Ferrand, France
- Occupation: Nun

Marguerite Périer (6 April 1646 – 14 April 1733) was a French nun and follower of Jansenism. She was the niece of Blaise Pascal, and wrote a biography of her uncle that has been preserved.

== The miracle of the Holy Thorn ==
Marguerite Périer was born in Clermont-Ferrand on 6 April 1646. She was the third of six children of Florin Périer (1605–1672), Seigneur de Bienassis, and Gilberte Périer (1620–1687).

Marguerite was the niece and goddaughter of Blaise Pascal. Her father was interested in mathematics and collaborated with Blaise Pascal in various scientific experiments. He would publish some of Pascal's treatises after Pascal died.

Marguerite was placed in the care of Port-Royal Abbey, Paris, in January 1654. Since the previous year she had been suffering from a serious eye problem described as a "lacrimal fistula". Preparations were being made to treat it surgically when on 24 March 1656 the child declared herself cured from placing her eye against a reliquary containing part of Christ's crown of thorns. (Note: The relic was supposed to be one of the thorns of the crown of Christ. It was gathered by Pierre Le Roy de La Poterie, a cousin of the Arnaulds and neighbor of Port-Royal) Various doctors judged the cure miraculous in the weeks that followed. However, Guy Patin, former dean of the Paris Faculty of Medicine, disputed the testimony of "these approvers of miracles". He said that some were too closely associated with Port-Royal to avoid bias, and others were unqualified "barber surgeons".

The event was widely publicized and for a while stopped the persecutions against the abbey. This miracle was central to the politico-religious debates of the time. The Jansenists saw it as a sign of God's support for their cause. Father François Annat, Jesuit and confessor of the king, responded with Le Rabat-joie des jansénistes. Without questioning the reality of the miracle, which was recognized by the church, he strongly attacked Port-Royal and interpreted the event as an invitation from God to abandon the Jansenist heresy. Antoine Arnauld and Sébastien-Joseph du Cambout responded to Annat.

According to Gilberte Périer in her Vie de Pascal, her brother experienced renewed certainty and joy by the grace of God to his goddaughter. It helped bring about the reconciliation between Pascal and his sister, and the faith preached at Port-Royal. According to legend the episode was the starting point of Pascal's reflections, recorded in his Pensées. Pascal addressed his seventeenth Provincial Letter to Father Annat.

However the miracle would be challenged later: medical knowledge has evolved. Marguerite probably only suffered from a tear duct obstruction.

== Austere and retired life ==
In 1661 all the residents of Port-Royal were thrown out. Marguerite Périer then led a secluded life, divided between Paris and Clermont. However, she maintained strong links with her friends of Port-Royal. In 1700, on the request of her brother Canon Louis Périer, she accepted the charge of running the Hôtel-Dieu in Clermont-Ferrand, but gave up this position in 1702 in a difficult political environment. She devoted herself to charitable works, settled permanently with her brother in Clermont-Ferrand and founded a mission in Cournon-d'Auvergne.

After the death of her brother in 1713 she devoted herself to the memory of Port-Royal by writing her memoirs (since lost) and Additions au nécrologe de Port-Royal (Additions to the Obituaries of Port-Royal) and by reviewing writings about her uncle. She then sold her property, established the general hospital of Clermont as her universal legatee (and thus the legatee of the Pascal and Périer families) and bequeathed her uncle's papers and one of his arithmetic machines to the Oratory of Jesus. She remained faithful to Jansenism until the end, appealing the bull Unigenitus in 1720. She was at first denied the last sacraments, which she obtained only on the express authority of the Bishop of Clermont. She died on 14 April 1733, 71 years after her uncle, at the age of 87, a great age at that time.

An ex-voto painting of the young Marguerite Périer kneeling at the altar that held the reliquary was completed in 1657 and has been preserved. It has been attributed to François Quesnel. Her biographies of her mother and her uncle Blaise Pascal have also been preserved, and are valuable historical sources.

== Bibliography ==
- Faugère, Prosper (1845), Lettres, opuscules et mémoires de madame Périer et de Jacqueline, sœurs de Pascal, et de Marguerite Périer, sa nièce / publ. sur les manuscrits originaux par M. P. Faugère, Paris: A. Vaton

== Sources ==
- Annat, François, Le Rabat-joie des jansénistes, ou observations nécessaires sur ce qu'on dit être arrivé à Port-Royal au sujet de la Sainte Épine, par un docteur de l'Eglise catholique (in French), p. 12
- Arnauld, A.; Pontchâteau, S.-J. de (1656), Réponse à un écrit publié sur le sujet des miracles qu'il a plu à Dieu de faire à Port-Royal depuis quelque temps par une Sainte Epine de la couronne de Notre Seigneur (in French), Paris, p. 40
- Ex-voto de Marguerite Périer (in French), BnF: Bibliotheque nationale de France
- Gouhier, Henri (1984), Blaise Pascal : Commentaires (in French), Vrin
- McKenna, A. (2004), "Périer, Marguerite", in McKenna, A.; Lesaulnier, J. (eds.), Dictionnaire de Port-Royal (in French), Paris: H. Champion
- Pierfit, "Marguerite PÉRIER", geneanet (in French)
- Richmond, Lisa (April 1998), The Composition, Publication, and Influence of Gilberte Perier's La Vie de Monsieur Pascal, The University of British Columbia
- Sainte-Beuve, Charles Augustin (1848), "XI", Port-Royal (in French), vol. III, Paris: L. Hachette
