= Perrier (disambiguation) =

Perrier is a brand of bottled mineral water.

Perrier may also refer to:

== People ==
- Bridget Perrier (born 1977), Canadian anti-prostitution activist
- Carlo Perrier (1886–1948), Italian mineralogist
- Denise Perrier (born 1935), French beauty queen
- Edmond Perrier (1844–1921), French zoologist
- Florent Perrier (born 1973), French ski mountaineer
- François Perrier (painter) (1590–1650), French painter
- François Perrier (French Army officer) (1835–1888), French geodesist
- François Perrier (psychoanalyst) (1922–1990), French psychoanalyst
- Georges Perrier (born 1943), French chef
- Georges Perrier (geodesist) (1872–1946), French geodesist and general
- Grace Perrier (1875–1979), Australian librarian
- Joseph Marie Henry Alfred Perrier de la Bâthie (1873–1958), French botanist
- Marcel Germain Perrier (1933–2017), French Roman Catholic bishop
- Marie-Jacques Perrier (1924– 2012), French singer, fashion journalist and author
- Mireille Perrier (born 1959), French actress
- Sébastien Perrier (born 1987), French ski mountaineer

== Other uses ==
- Perrier à boîte, a type of small breech-loading cannon
- Perrier noir, a French wine grape that is also known as Mornen noir
- Perrier, Puy-de-Dôme, a commune of the Puy-de-Dôme département, France
- Perrier, a traction (man-powered) trebuchet
- Edinburgh Comedy Awards, an award formerly known as Perrier, presented at the Edinburgh Festival Fringe
