= Blaise Pascal =

French polymath (1623–1662)

- Pascal, c. 1691
- Born: 19 June 1623; Clermont-Ferrand, France
- Died: 19 August 1662 (aged 39); Paris, France
- Father: Étienne Pascal
- Relatives: Marguerite Périer (niece); Jacqueline Pascal (sister); Gilberte Périer (sister)

Philosophical work
- Era: 17th-century philosophy
- Region: Western philosophy
- School: Cartesianism; Jansenism; Fideism
- Main interests: Theology; Mathematics; Philosophy; Physics
- Notable ideas: Probability theory; Pascal distribution Pascal's wager; Pascal's triangle; Pascal's law; Pascal's rule; Pascal's theorem; Pascal's calculator

Blaise Pascal (Note: /pæˈskæl/ pass-KAL, also UK: /-ˈskɑːl, ˈpæskəl, -skæl/ -KAHL, PASS-kəl, -kal, US: /pɑːˈskɑːl/ pahs-KAHL; French: [blɛz paskal]) (19 June 1623 – 19 August 1662) was a French mathematician, physicist, inventor, philosopher, and Catholic writer.

Pascal was a child prodigy who was educated by his father Étienne Pascal, a tax collector in Rouen. His earliest mathematical work was on projective geometry; he wrote a significant treatise on the subject of conic sections at the age of 16. He later corresponded with Pierre de Fermat on probability theory, strongly influencing the development of modern economics and social science. In 1642, he started some pioneering work on calculating machines (called Pascal's calculators and later Pascalines), establishing him as one of the first two inventors of the mechanical calculator.

Like his contemporary René Descartes, Pascal was also a pioneer in the natural and applied sciences. Pascal wrote in defence of the scientific method and produced several controversial results. He made important contributions to the study of fluids, and clarified the concepts of pressure and vacuum by generalising the work of Evangelista Torricelli. The SI unit for pressure is named for Pascal. Following Torricelli and Galileo Galilei, in 1647, he rebutted the likes of Aristotle and Descartes who insisted that nature abhors a vacuum.

He is also credited as the inventor of modern public transportation, having established the carrosses à cinq sols, the first modern public transport service, shortly before his death in 1662.

In 1646, he and his sister Jacqueline identified with the religious movement within Catholicism known by its detractors as Jansenism. Following a religious experience in late 1654, he began writing influential works on philosophy and theology. His two most famous works date from this period: the Lettres provinciales and the Pensées, the former set in the conflict between Jansenists and Jesuits. The latter contains Pascal's wager, known in the original as the Discourse on the Machine, a fideistic probabilistic argument for why one should believe in God. In that year, he also wrote an important treatise on the arithmetical triangle. Between 1658 and 1659, he wrote on the cycloid and its use in calculating the volume of solids. Following several years of illness, Pascal died in Paris at the age of 39.

== Early life and education ==
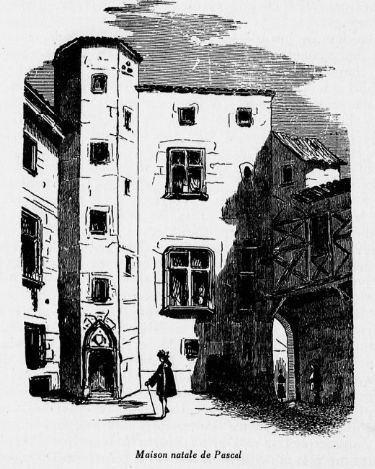
Pascal's birthplace

Pascal was born in Clermont-Ferrand, which is in France's Auvergne region, by the Massif Central. He lost his mother, Antoinette Begon, at the age of three. His father, Étienne Pascal, also an amateur mathematician, was a local judge and member of the "Noblesse de Robe". Pascal had two sisters, the younger Jacqueline and the elder Gilberte.

=== Move to Paris ===
In 1631, five years after the death of his wife, Étienne Pascal moved with his children to Paris. The newly arrived family soon hired Louise Delfault, a maid who eventually became a key member of the family. Étienne, who never remarried, decided that he alone would educate his children.

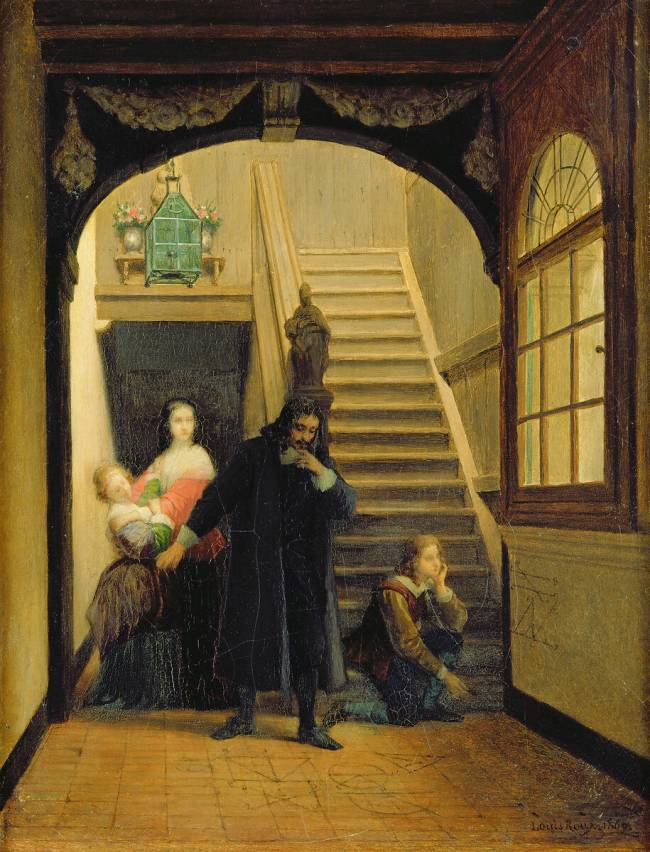
A scene from Pascal's youth

The young Pascal showed an extraordinary intellectual ability, with an amazing aptitude for mathematics and science. Etienne had tried to keep his son from learning mathematics; but by the age of 12, Pascal had rediscovered, on his own, using charcoal on a tile floor, Euclid’s first thirty-two geometric propositions, and was thus given a copy of Euclid's Elements.

==== Essay on Conics ====
Particularly of interest to Pascal was a work of Desargues on conic sections. Following Desargues' thinking, the 16-year-old Pascal produced, as a means of proof, a short treatise on what was called the Mystic Hexagram, Essai pour les coniques (Essay on Conics) and sent it — his first serious work of mathematics — to Père Mersenne in Paris; it is known still today as Pascal's theorem. It states that if a hexagon is inscribed in a circle (or conic), then the three intersection points of opposite sides lie on a line (called the Pascal line).

Pascal's work was so precocious that René Descartes was convinced that Pascal's father had written it. When assured by Mersenne that it was, indeed, the product of the son and not the father, Descartes replied: "I do not find it strange that he has offered demonstrations about conics more appropriate than those of the ancients," adding, "but other matters related to this subject can be proposed that would scarcely occur to a 16-year-old child."

=== Leaving Paris ===
In France at that time, offices and positions could be—and were—bought and sold. In 1631, Étienne sold his position as second president of the Cour des Aides for 65,665 livres. The money was invested in a government bond which provided, if not a lavish, then certainly a comfortable income which allowed the Pascal family to move to, and enjoy, Paris, but in 1638 Cardinal Richelieu, desperate for money to carry on the Thirty Years' War, defaulted on the government's bonds. Suddenly, Étienne Pascal's worth had dropped from nearly 66,000 livres to less than 7,300.

Like so many others, Étienne was eventually forced to flee Paris because of his opposition to the fiscal policies of Richelieu, leaving his three children in the care of his neighbour Madame Sainctot, a great beauty with an infamous past who kept one of the most glittering and intellectual salons in all of France. It was only when Jacqueline performed well in a children's play with Richelieu in attendance that Étienne was pardoned. In time, Étienne was back in good graces with the Cardinal and in 1639 had been appointed the king's commissioner of taxes in the city of Rouen—a city whose tax records, thanks to uprisings, were in utter chaos.

=== Pascaline ===
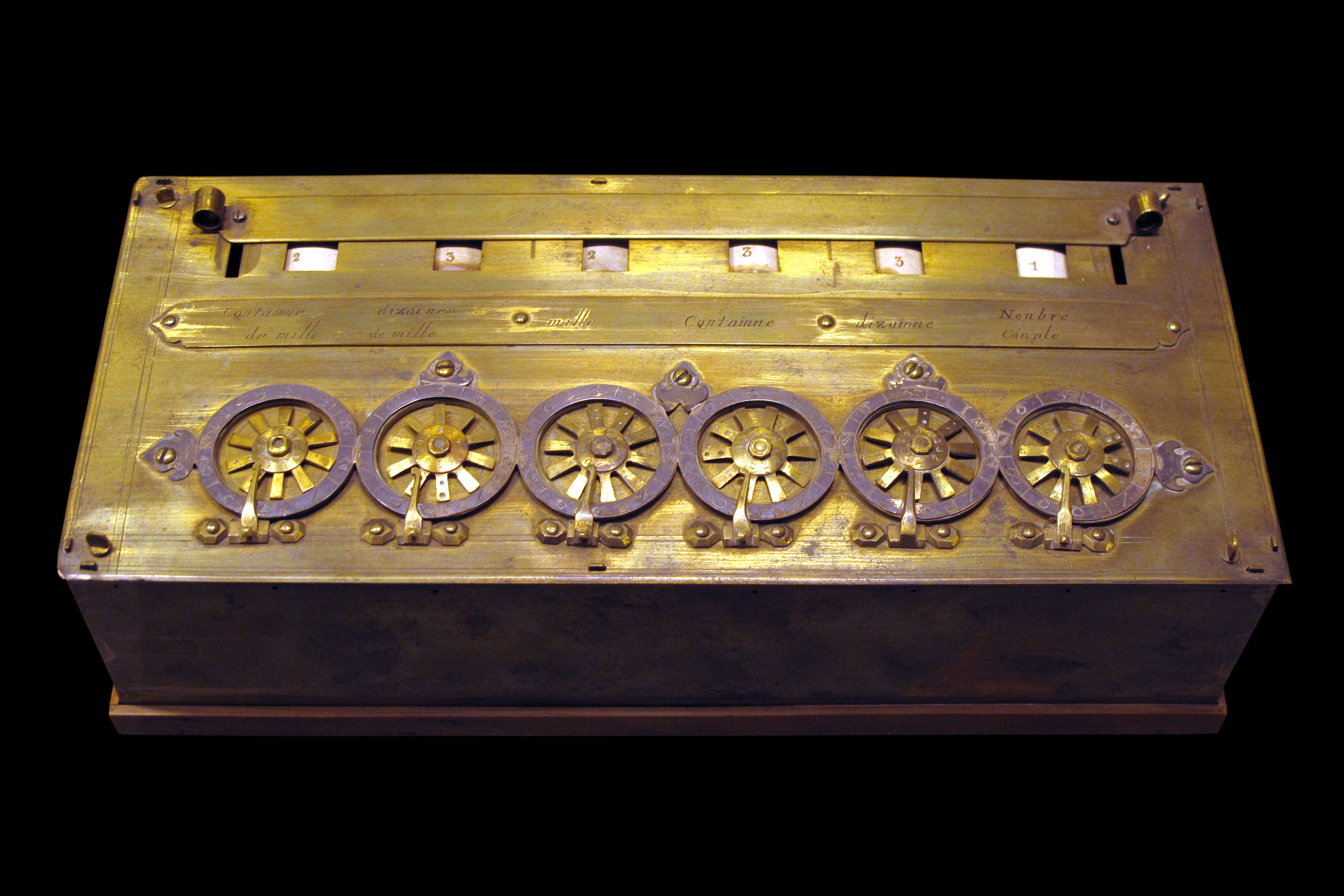
An early Pascaline on display at the Musée des Arts et Métiers, Paris

In 1642, in an effort to ease his father's endless, exhausting calculations and recalculations of taxes owed and paid (into which work the young Pascal had been recruited), Pascal, not yet 19, constructed a mechanical calculator capable of addition and subtraction, called Pascal's calculator or the Pascaline. Of the eight Pascalines known to have survived, four are held by the Musée des Arts et Métiers in Paris and one more by the Zwinger museum in Dresden, Germany, which exhibit two of his original mechanical calculators.

Although these machines are pioneering forerunners to a further 400 years of development of mechanical methods of calculation, and in a sense to the later field of computer engineering, the calculator failed to be a great commercial success. Partly because it was still quite cumbersome to use in practice, but probably primarily because it was extraordinarily expensive, the Pascaline became little more than a toy, and a status symbol, for the very rich both in France and elsewhere in Europe. He also presented the first mechanical calculator to Christina, Queen of Sweden in 1652. Pascal continued to make improvements to his design through the next decade, and he refers to some 50 machines that were built to his design. He built 20 finished machines over the following 10 years.

== Mathematics ==
=== Probability ===
In 1654, prompted by his friend the Chevalier de Méré, Pascal corresponded with Pierre de Fermat on the subject of gambling problems, and from that collaboration was born the mathematical theory of probability. The specific problem was that of two players who want to finish a game early and, given the current circumstances of the game, want to divide the stakes fairly, based on the chance each has of winning the game from that point. The notion of expected value evolved from this discussion. John Ross writes, "Probability theory and the discoveries following it changed the way we regard uncertainty, risk, decision-making, and an individual's and society's ability to influence the course of future events." Pascal, in the Pensées, used a probabilistic argument, Pascal's wager, to justify belief in God and a virtuous life. However, Pascal and Fermat, though doing important early work in probability theory, did not develop the field very far. Christiaan Huygens, learning of the subject from the correspondence of Pascal and Fermat, wrote the first book on the subject. Later figures who continued the development of the theory include Abraham de Moivre and Pierre-Simon Laplace. The work done by Fermat and Pascal on the calculus of probabilities laid important groundwork for Leibniz's formulation of the calculus.

=== Treatise on the Arithmetical Triangle ===
Pascal's triangle. Each number is the sum of the two directly above it. The triangle demonstrates many mathematical properties in addition to showing binomial coefficients.

Pascal's Traité du triangle arithmétique, written in 1654 but published posthumously in 1665, described a convenient tabular presentation for binomial coefficients which he called the arithmetical triangle, but is now called Pascal's triangle. The triangle can also be represented:

	0	1	2	3	4	5	6
0	1	1	1	1	1	1	1
1	1	2	3	4	5	6	
2	1	3	6	10	15		
3	1	4	10	20			
4	1	5	15				
5	1	6					
6	1						

He defined the numbers in the triangle by recursion: Call the number in the (m + 1)th row and (n + 1)th column t_{mn}. Then t_{mn} = t_{m−1,n} + t_{m,n−1}, for m = 0, 1, 2, ... and n = 0, 1, 2, ... The boundary conditions are t_{m,−1} = 0, t_{−1,n} = 0 for m = 1, 2, 3, ... and n = 1, 2, 3, ... The generator t_{00} = 1. Pascal concluded with the proof,

$$t_{mn} = \frac{(m+n)(m+n-1)\cdots(m+1)}{n(n-1)\cdots 1}.$$

In the same treatise, Pascal gave an explicit statement of the principle of mathematical induction. In 1654, he proved Pascal's identity relating the sums of the p-th powers of the first n positive integers for p = 0, 1, 2, ..., k.

That same year, Pascal had a religious experience, and he mostly gave up work in mathematics.

=== Cycloid ===
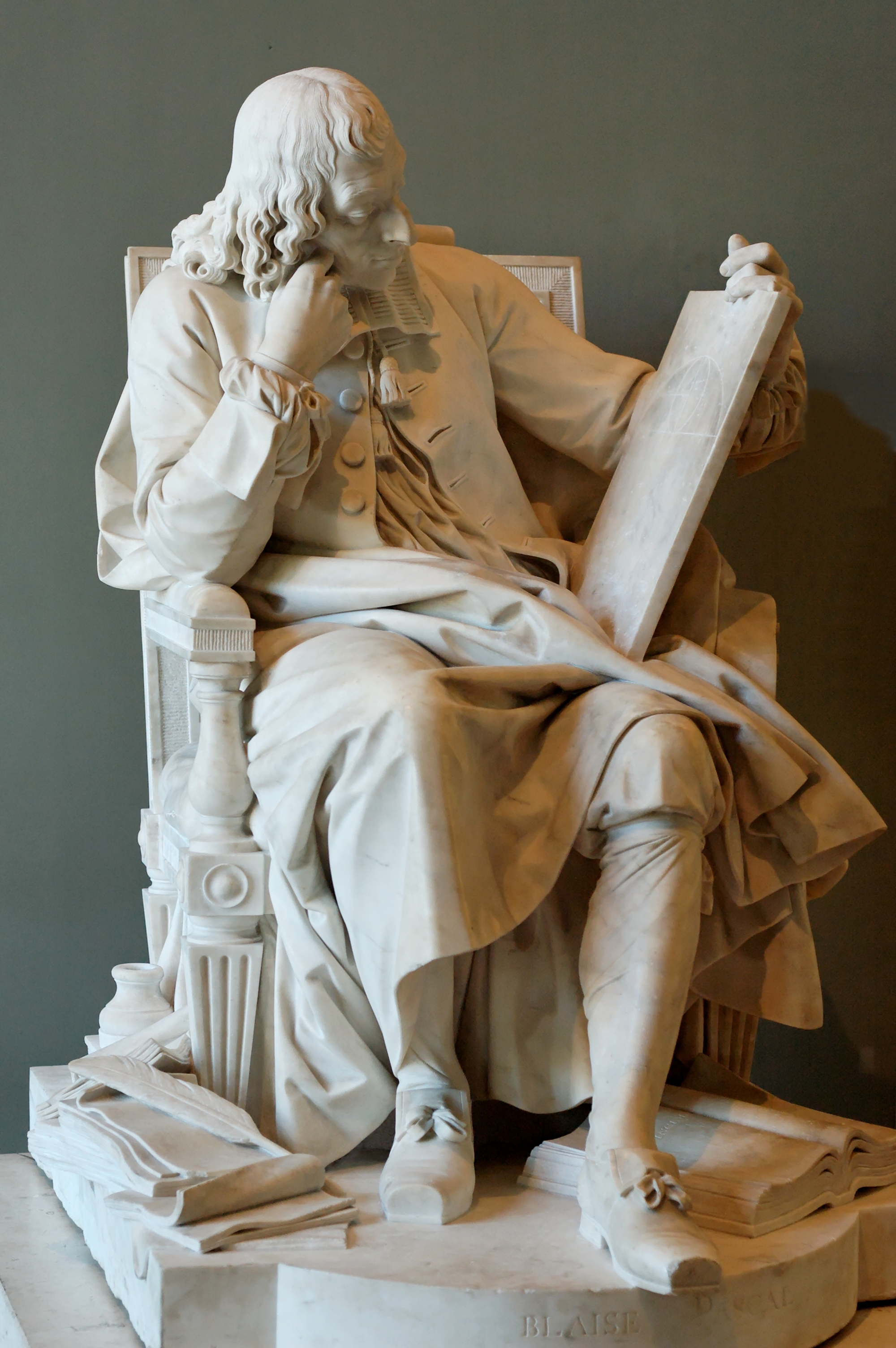
Pascal studying the cycloid, by Augustin Pajou, 1785, Louvre

In 1658, Pascal, while suffering from a toothache, began considering several problems concerning the cycloid. His toothache disappeared, and he took this as a heavenly sign to proceed with his research. Eight days later he had completed his essay and, to publicize the results, proposed a contest.

Pascal proposed three questions relating to the centre of gravity, area and volume of the cycloid, with the winner or winners to receive prizes of 20 and 40 Spanish doubloons. Pascal, Gilles de Roberval and Pierre de Carcavi were the judges, and neither of the two submissions (by John Wallis and Antoine de Lalouvère) were judged to be adequate. While the contest was ongoing, Christopher Wren sent Pascal a proposal for a proof of the rectification of the cycloid; Roberval claimed promptly that he had known of the proof for years. Wallis published Wren's proof (crediting Wren) in Wallis's Tractus Duo, giving Wren priority for the first published proof.

== Physics ==
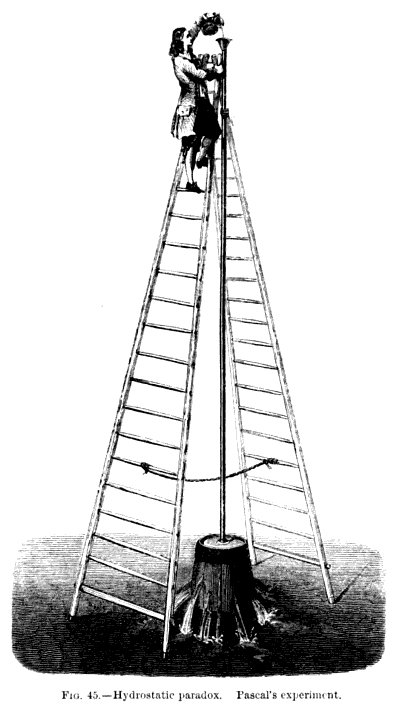
An illustration of the (apocryphal) Pascal's barrel experiment

Pascal contributed to several fields in physics, most notably the fields of fluid mechanics and pressure. In honour of his scientific contributions, the name Pascal has been given to the SI unit of pressure and Pascal's law (an important principle of hydrostatics). He introduced a primitive form of roulette and the roulette wheel in his search for a perpetual motion machine. Blaise Pascal Chairs are given to outstanding international scientists to conduct their research in the Ile de France region.

=== Fluid dynamics ===
His work in the fields of hydrodynamics and hydrostatics centred on the principles of hydraulic fluids. His inventions include the hydraulic press (using hydraulic pressure to multiply force) and the syringe. He proved that hydrostatic pressure depends not on the weight of the fluid but on the elevation difference. He allegedly demonstrated this principle by attaching a thin tube to a barrel full of water and filling the tube with water up to the level of the third floor of a building. This caused the barrel to leak, in what became known as Pascal's barrel experiment.

=== Vacuum ===
By 1647, Pascal had learned of Evangelista Torricelli's experimentation with barometers. Having replicated an experiment that involved placing a tube filled with mercury upside down in a bowl of mercury, Pascal questioned what force kept some mercury in the tube and what filled the space above the mercury in the tube. At the time, most scientists, including Descartes, believed in a plenum, i.e. some invisible matter filled all of space, rather than a vacuum ("Nature abhors a vacuum)." This was based on the Aristotelian notion that everything in motion was a substance, moved by another substance. Furthermore, light passed through the glass tube, suggesting a substance such as aether rather than a vacuum filled the space.

Following more experimentation in this vein, in 1647 Pascal produced Experiences nouvelles touchant le vide ("New experiments with the vacuum"), which detailed basic rules describing to what degree various liquids could be supported by air pressure. It also provided reasons why it was indeed a vacuum above the column of liquid in a barometer tube. This work was followed by Récit de la grande expérience de l'équilibre des liqueurs ("Account of the great experiment on equilibrium in liquids") published in 1648.

==== First atmospheric pressure vs. altitude experiment ====
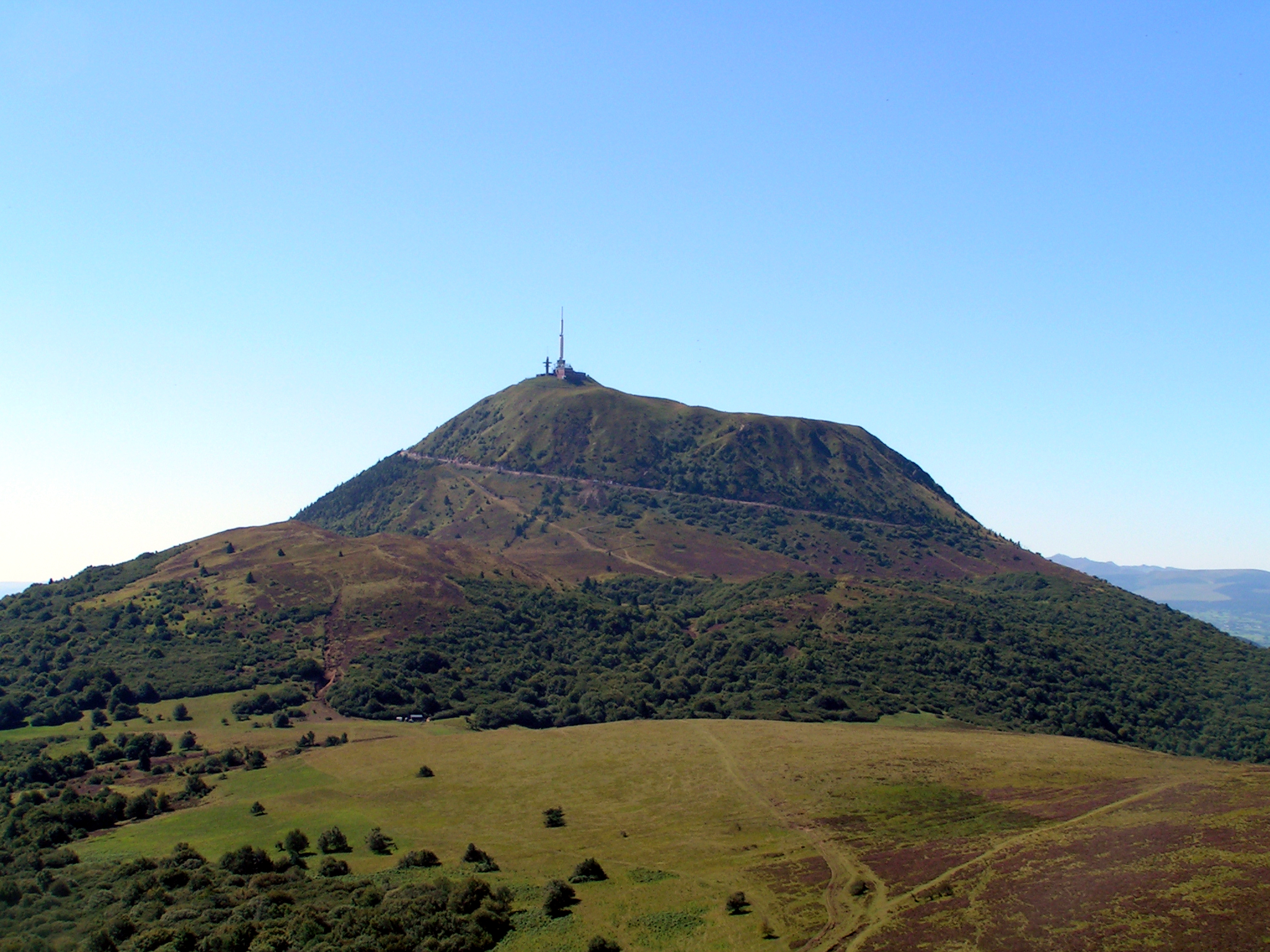
Puy de Dôme

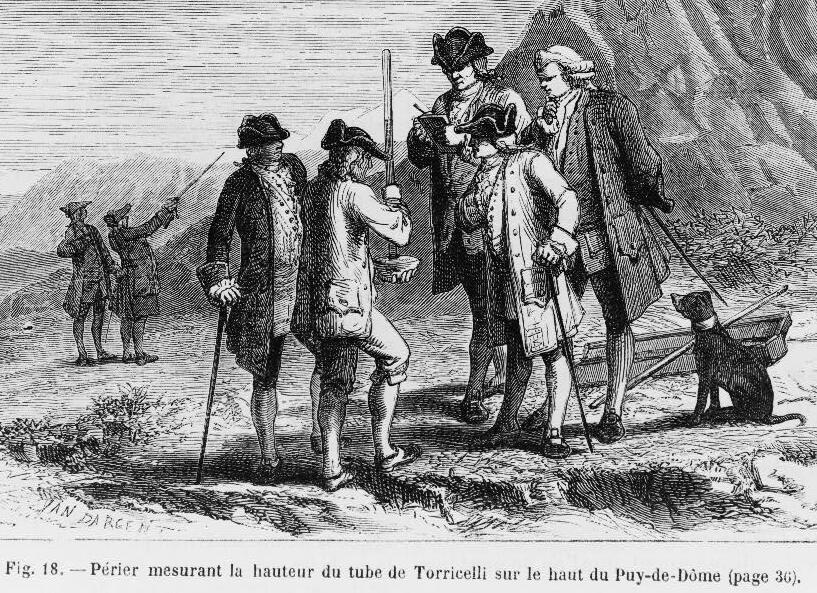
Florin Périer on the Puy de Dôme

The Torricellian vacuum found that air pressure is equal to the weight of 30 inches of mercury. If air has a finite weight, Earth's atmosphere must have a maximum height. Pascal reasoned that if true, air pressure on a high mountain must be less than at a lower altitude. He lived near the Puy de Dôme mountain, 4,790 feet (1,460 m) tall, but his health was poor, so he could not climb it. On 19 September 1648, after many months of Pascal's friendly but insistent prodding, Florin Périer, husband of Pascal's elder sister Gilberte, was finally able to carry out the fact-finding mission vital to Pascal's theory. The account, written by Périer, reads:

The weather was chancy last Saturday...[but] around five o'clock that morning...the Puy-de-Dôme was visible...so I decided to give it a try. Several important people of the city of Clermont had asked me to let them know when I would make the ascent...I was delighted to have them with me in this great work...

...at eight o'clock we met in the gardens of the Minim Fathers, which has the lowest elevation in town....First I poured 16 pounds of quicksilver...into a vessel...then took several glass tubes...each four feet long and hermetically sealed at one end and opened at the other...then placed them in the vessel [of quicksilver]...I found the quick silver stood at 26" and 3 1/2 lines above the quicksilver in the vessel...I repeated the experiment two more times while standing in the same spot...[they] produced the same result each time...

I attached one of the tubes to the vessel and marked the height of the quicksilver and...asked Father Chastin, one of the Minim Brothers...to watch if any changes should occur through the day...Taking the other tube and a portion of the quick silver...I walked to the top of Puy-de-Dôme, about 500 fathoms higher than the monastery, where upon experiment...found that the quicksilver reached a height of only 23" and 2 lines...I repeated the experiment five times with care...each at different points on the summit...found the same height of quicksilver...in each case...

Pascal replicated the experiment in Paris by carrying a barometer up to the top of the bell tower at the church of Saint-Jacques-de-la-Boucherie, a height of about 50 metres. The mercury dropped two lines. He found with both experiments that an ascent of 7 fathoms lowers the mercury by half a line. (Note: 1 ligne = 2.256 mm, and 1 toise = 1.949 m. Mercury density is 13.534 g/cm3. So by Pascal's numbers, the density of air is about 1.1 kg/m^{3}.) Note: Pascal used pouce and ligne for "inch" and "line", and toise for "fathom".

In a reply to Étienne Noël, who believed in the plenum, Pascal wrote, echoing contemporary notions of science and falsifiability: "In order to show that a hypothesis is evident, it does not suffice that all the phenomena follow from it; instead, if it leads to something contrary to a single one of the phenomena, that suffices to establish its falsity."

== Adult life: religion, literature, and philosophy ==
=== Religious conversion ===
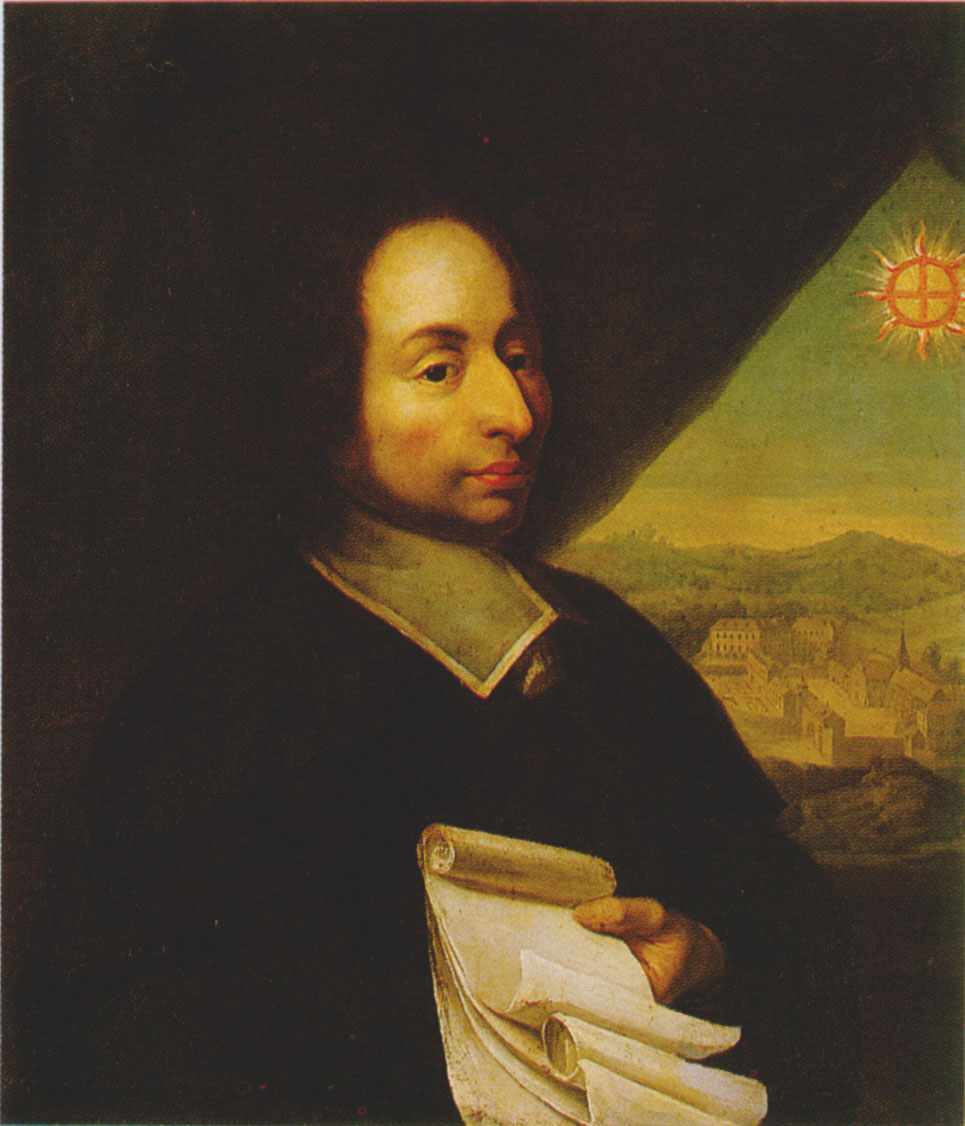
Portrait of Pascal

In the winter of 1646, Pascal's 58-year-old father broke his hip when he slipped and fell on an icy street of Rouen; given the man's age and the state of medicine in the 17th century, a broken hip could be a very serious condition, perhaps even fatal. Rouen was home to two of the finest doctors in France, Deslandes and de la Bouteillerie. The elder Pascal "would not let anyone other than these men attend him.... It was a good choice, for the old man survived and was able to walk again...." Treatment and rehabilitation took three months, during which time La Bouteillerie and Deslandes had become regular visitors.

Both men were followers of Jean Guillebert, a proponent of a splinter group from Catholic teaching known as Jansenism. This still fairly small sect was making surprising inroads into the French Catholic community at that time. It espoused rigorous Augustinism. Blaise spoke with the doctors frequently, and after their successful treatment of his father, borrowed from them works by Jansenist authors. In this period, Pascal experienced a sort of "first conversion" and began to write on theological subjects in the course of the following year.

Pascal fell away from this initial religious engagement and experienced a few years of what some biographers have called his "worldly period" (1648–54). His father died in 1651 and left his inheritance to Pascal and his sister Jacqueline, for whom Pascal acted as conservator. Jacqueline announced that she would soon become a postulant in the Jansenist convent of Port-Royal. Pascal was deeply affected and very sad, not because of her choice, but because of his chronic poor health; he needed her just as she had needed him.

Suddenly there was war in the Pascal household. Blaise pleaded with Jacqueline not to leave, but she was adamant. He commanded her to stay, but that didn't work, either. At the heart of this was...Blaise's fear of abandonment...if Jacqueline entered Port-Royal, she would have to leave her inheritance behind...[but] nothing would change her mind.

By the end of October in 1651, a truce had been reached between brother and sister. In return for a healthy annual stipend, Jacqueline signed over her part of the inheritance to her brother. Gilberte had already been given her inheritance in the form of a dowry. In early January, Jacqueline left for Port-Royal. On that day, according to Gilberte concerning her brother, "He retired very sadly to his rooms without seeing Jacqueline, who was waiting in the little parlor." In early June 1653, after what must have seemed like endless badgering from Jacqueline, Pascal formally signed over the whole of his sister's inheritance to Port-Royal, which, to him, "had begun to smell like a cult". With two-thirds of his father's estate now gone, the 29-year-old Pascal was now consigned to genteel poverty.

For a while, Pascal pursued the life of a bachelor. During visits to his sister at Port-Royal in 1654, he displayed contempt for affairs of the world but was not drawn to God.

==== Memorial ====
On 23 November, 1654, between 10:30 and 12:30 at night, Pascal had an intense religious experience and immediately wrote a brief note to himself which began: "Fire. God of Abraham, God of Isaac, God of Jacob, not of the philosophers and the scholars..." and concluded by quoting Psalm 119:16: "I will not forget thy word. Amen." He seems to have carefully sewn this document into his coat and always transferred it when he changed clothes; a servant discovered it only by chance after his death. This piece is now known as the Memorial. The story of a carriage accident as having led to the experience described in the Memorial is disputed by some scholars. His belief and religious commitment revitalized, Pascal visited the older of two convents at Port-Royal for a two-week retreat in January 1655. For the next four years, he regularly travelled between Port-Royal and Paris. It was at this point, immediately after his conversion, that he began writing his first major literary work on religion, the Provincial Letters.

== Literature ==
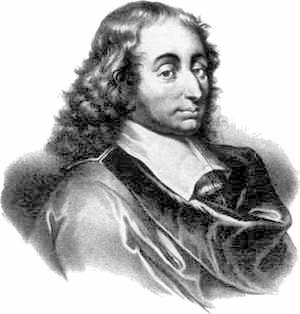
Pascal

In literature, Pascal is regarded as one of the most important authors of the French Classical Period and is read today as one of the greatest masters of French prose. Seymour Eaton called him "the greatest of all French thinkers". His use of satire and wit influenced later polemicists.

=== The Provincial Letters ===
Beginning in 1656–57, Pascal published his memorable attack on casuistry, a popular ethical method used by Catholic thinkers in the early modern period (especially the Jesuits, and in particular Antonio Escobar). Pascal denounced casuistry as the mere use of complex reasoning to justify moral laxity and all sorts of sins. The 18-letter series was published between 1656 and 1657 under the pseudonym Louis de Montalte and incensed Louis XIV. The king ordered that the book be shredded and burnt in 1660. In 1661, in the midst of the formulary controversy, the Jansenist school at Port-Royal was condemned and closed down; those involved with the school had to sign a 1656 papal bull condemning the teachings of Jansen as heretical. The final letter from Pascal, in 1657, had defied Alexander VII himself. Even Pope Alexander, while publicly opposing them, was nonetheless persuaded by Pascal's arguments.

Aside from their religious influence, the Provincial Letters were popular as a literary work. Pascal's use of humour, mockery, and vicious satire in his arguments made the letters ripe for public consumption and influenced the prose of later French writers like Voltaire and Jean-Jacques Rousseau.

It is in the Provincial Letters that Pascal made his oft-quoted apology for writing a long letter, as he had not had time to write a shorter one. From Letter XVI, as translated by Thomas M'Crie: 'Reverend fathers, my letters were not wont either to be so prolix, or to follow so closely on one another. Want of time must plead my excuse for both of these faults. The present letter is a very long one, simply because I had no leisure to make it shorter.'

Charles Perrault wrote of the Letters: "Everything is there—purity of language, nobility of thought, solidity in reasoning, finesse in raillery, and throughout an agrément not to be found anywhere else."

=== Philosophy ===
Émile Faguet called Pascal "one of the greatest of French philosophers". Pascal was a dualist and scientist following René Descartes.

==== Philosophy of religion ====
A scene of Desargues, Mersenne, Pascal, and Descartes

However, Pascal cared most of all about the philosophy of religion, writing that Descartes' philosophy was "useless and uncertain". He further wrote: "I cannot forgive Descartes. In all his philosophy he would have been quite willing to dispense with God, but he couldn't avoid letting him put the world in motion; afterwards he didn't need God anymore".

Pascal opposed both the rationalism of the likes of Descartes, stating "reason can decide nothing here", and the main countervailing epistemology, empiricism, preferring fideism. For Pascal, the nature of God was such that proofs cannot reveal Him. Humans "are in darkness and estranged from God" because "he has hidden Himself from their knowledge". Pascalian theology has grown out of his perspective that humans are, according to Wood, "born into a duplicitous world that shapes us into duplicitous subjects and so we find it easy to reject God continually and deceive ourselves about our own sinfulness".

===== Pensées =====
Man is only a reed, the weakest in nature, but he is a thinking reed.

— Blaise Pascal, Pensées, No. 200

Pascal's most influential theological work, referred to posthumously as the Pensées ("Thoughts"), is widely considered to be a masterpiece and a landmark in French prose. When commenting on one particular section (Thought #72), Sainte-Beuve praised it as the finest pages in the French language. Will Durant hailed the Pensées as "the most eloquent book in French prose".

The Pensées was not completed before his death. It was to have been a sustained and coherent examination and defence of the Christian faith, with the original title Apologie de la religion Chrétienne ("Defence of the Christian Religion"). The first version of the numerous scraps of paper found after his death appeared in print as a book in 1669 titled Pensées de M. Pascal sur la religion, et sur quelques autres sujets ("Thoughts of M. Pascal on religion, and on some other subjects") and soon thereafter became a classic.

One of the Apologie's main strategies was to use the contradictory philosophies of Pyrrhonism and Stoicism, personalized by Montaigne on one hand, and Epictetus on the other, in order to bring the unbeliever to such despair and confusion that he would embrace God.

==== Philosophy of mathematics ====
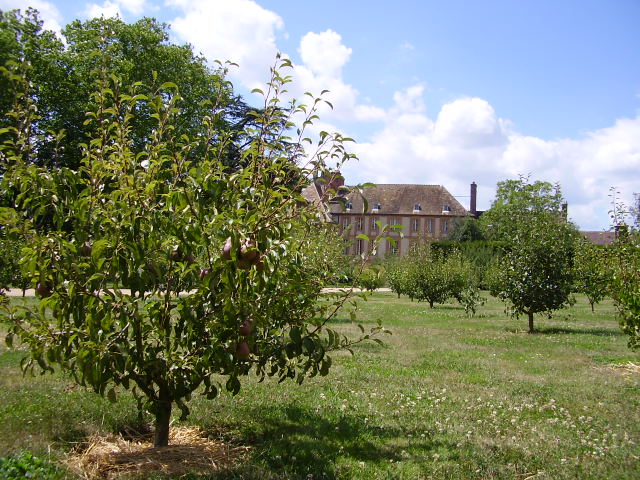
The orchards of Port-Royal

Pascal's major contribution to the philosophy of mathematics came with his De l'Esprit géométrique ("Of the Geometrical Spirit"), originally written as a preface to a geometry textbook for one of the famous Petites écoles de Port-Royal ("Little Schools of Port-Royal"). The work was unpublished until over a century after his death. Here, Pascal looked into the issue of discovering truths, arguing that the ideal of such a method would be to found all propositions on already established truths. At the same time, however, he claimed this was impossible because such established truths would require other truths to back them up—first principles, therefore, cannot be reached. Based on this, Pascal argued that the procedure used in geometry was as perfect as possible, with certain principles assumed and other propositions developed from them. Nevertheless, there was no way to know whether the assumed principles were true.

Pascal also used De l'Esprit géométrique to develop a theory of definition. He distinguished between definitions which are conventional labels defined by the writer and definitions which are within the language and understood by everyone because they naturally designate their referent. The second type would be characteristic of the philosophy of essentialism. Pascal claimed that only definitions of the first type were important to science and mathematics, arguing that those fields should adopt the philosophy of formalism as formulated by Descartes.

In De l'Art de persuader ("On the Art of Persuasion"), Pascal looked deeper into geometry's axiomatic method, specifically the question of how people come to be convinced of the axioms upon which later conclusions are based. Pascal agreed with Montaigne that achieving certainty in these axioms and conclusions through human methods is impossible. He asserted that these principles can be grasped only through intuition, and that this fact underscored the necessity for submission to God in searching out truths.

== Last works and death ==
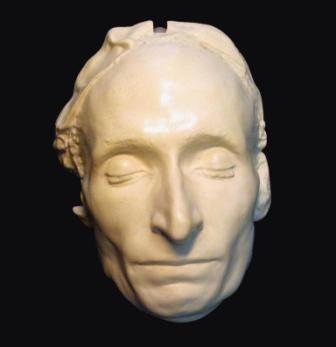
Death mask of Blaise Pascal

T. S. Eliot described him during this phase of his life as "a man of the world among ascetics, and an ascetic among men of the world." Pascal's ascetic lifestyle derived from a belief that it was natural and necessary for a person to suffer. In 1659, Pascal fell seriously ill. During his last years, he frequently tried to reject the ministrations of his doctors, saying, "Don't pity me, sickness is the natural state of Christians, because in it we are, as we should always be, in the suffering of evils, in the deprivation of all the goods and pleasures of the senses, free from all the passions that work throughout the course of life, without ambition, without avarice, in the continual expectation of death." Desiring to imitate Jesus’ poverty of spirit, in his spirit of zeal and charity, Pascal said if God allowed him to recover from his illness, he would be resolved to "have no other employment or occupation for the rest of my life than the service of the poor."

Louis XIV suppressed the Jansenist movement at Port-Royal in 1661. In response, Pascal wrote one of his final works, Écrit sur la signature du formulaire ("Writ on the Signing of the Form"), exhorting the Jansenists not to give in. Later that year, his sister Jacqueline died, which convinced Pascal to cease his polemics on Jansenism.

=== Inventor of public transportation ===
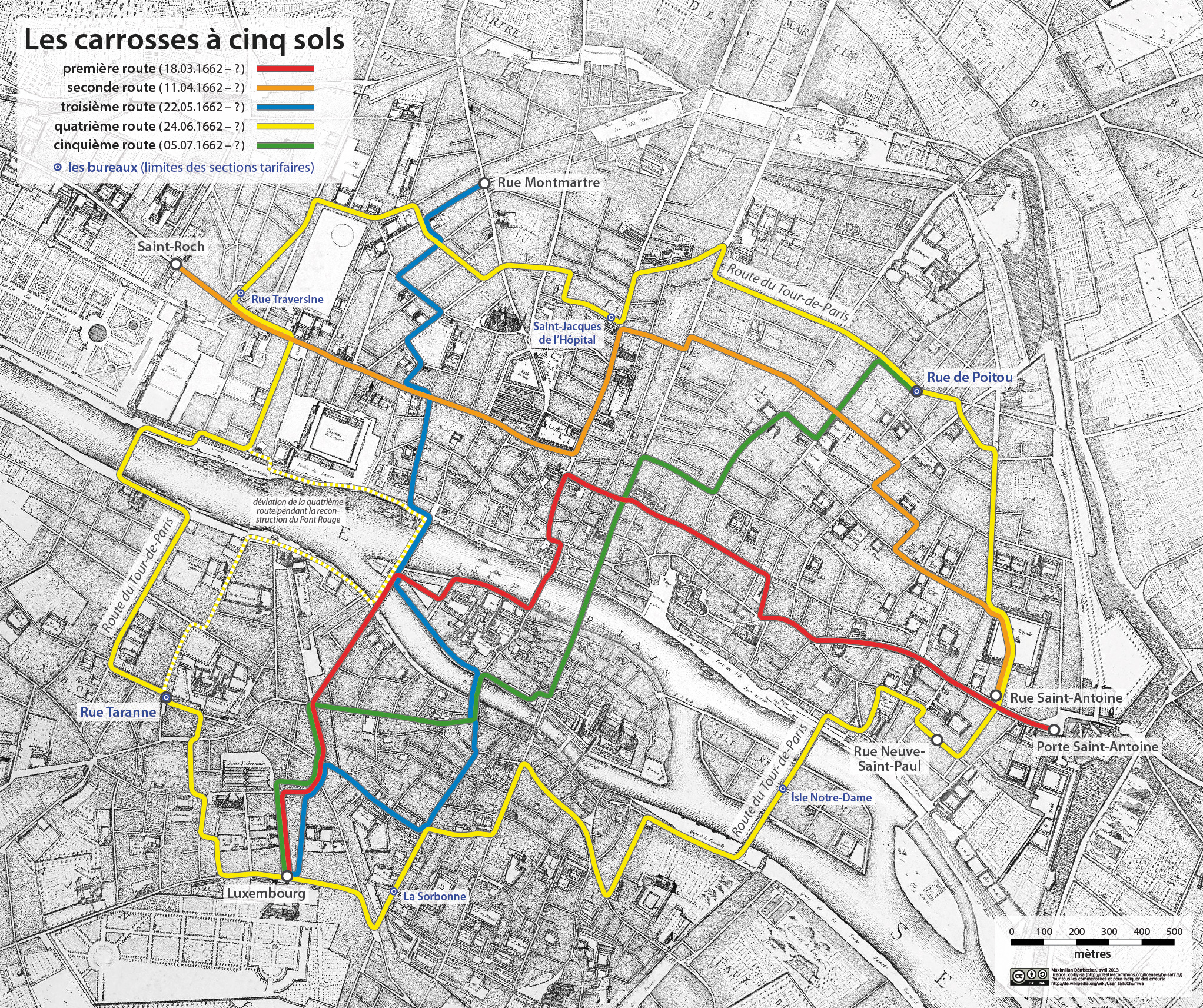
Route map of the carrosses à cinq sols in central Paris

Pascal's last major achievement, returning to his mechanical genius, was inaugurating one of the first land-based public transport services, the carrosses à cinq sols, a network of horse-drawn multi-seat carriages that carried passengers on five fixed routes. Pascal also designated the operation principles which were later used to plan public transportation; the carriages had a fixed route, fixed price (five sols, hence the name), and left even if there were no passengers. The lines were not commercially successful, and the last one closed by 1675. Nonetheless, he has been described as the inventor of public transportation.

=== Illness and death ===
In 1662, Pascal's illness became more violent, and his emotional condition had severely worsened since his sister's death. Aware that his health was fading quickly, he sought a move to the hospital for incurable diseases, but his doctors declared that he was too unstable to be carried. In Paris on 18 August 1662, Pascal went into convulsions and received extreme unction. He died the next morning, his last words being "May God never abandon me," and was buried in the cemetery of Saint-Étienne-du-Mont.

An autopsy performed after his death revealed grave problems with his stomach and other organs of his abdomen, along with damage to his brain. Despite the autopsy, the cause of his poor health was never precisely determined, though speculation focuses on tuberculosis, stomach cancer, or a combination of the two. The headaches which affected Pascal are generally attributed to his brain lesion.

== Legacy ==
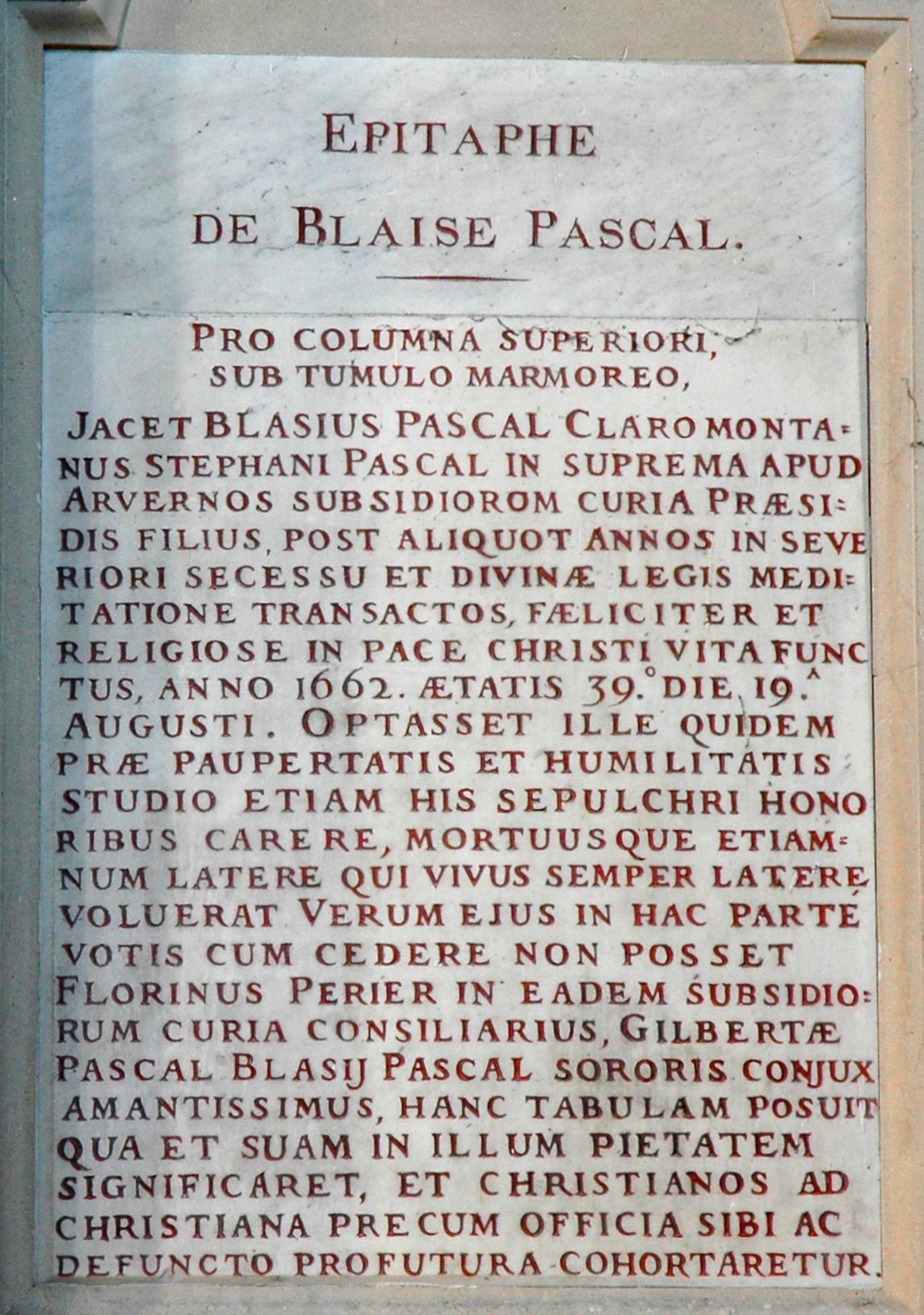
Pascal's epitaph in Saint-Étienne-du-Mont, where he was buried

One of the Universities of Clermont-Ferrand, France—Université Blaise Pascal—is named after him. Établissement scolaire français Blaise-Pascal in Lubumbashi, Democratic Republic of the Congo, is named after Pascal.

The 1969 Eric Rohmer film My Night at Maud's is based on the work of Pascal. Roberto Rossellini directed a filmed biopic, Blaise Pascal, which originally aired on Italian television in 1971. Pascal was a subject of the first edition of the 1984 BBC Two documentary, Sea of Faith, presented by Don Cupitt.

A programming language is named for Pascal. In 2014, Nvidia announced its new Pascal microarchitecture, which is named for Pascal. The first graphics cards featuring Pascal were released in 2016.

The minor planet 4500 Pascal is named in his honor.

Pope Paul VI, in encyclical Populorum progressio, issued in 1967, quotes Pascal's Pensées:

True humanism points the way toward God and acknowledges the task to which we are called, the task which offers us the real meaning of human life. Man is not the ultimate measure of man. Man becomes truly man only by passing beyond himself. In the words of Pascal: "Man infinitely surpasses man.

In 2023, Pope Francis released an apostolic letter, Sublimitas et miseria hominis, dedicated to Blaise Pascal, in commemoration of the fourth centenary of his birth.

Pascal influenced both French sociologist Pierre Bourdieu, who named his Pascalian Meditations (1997) after him, and French philosopher Louis Althusser.

== Works ==
- Essai pour les coniques [Essay on conics] (1639)
- Experiences nouvelles touchant le vide [New experiments with the vacuum] (1647)
- Récit de la grande expérience de l'équilibre des liqueurs [Account of the great experiment on equilibrium in liquids] (1648)
- Traité du triangle arithmétique [Treatise on the arithmetical triangle] (written c. 1654; publ. 1665)
- Lettres provinciales [The Provincial Letters] (1656–57)
- De l'Esprit géométrique [On the Geometrical Spirit] (1657 or 1658)
- Traité des sinus du quart de cercle [Treatise on the sine of the quarter-circle] (1658)
- Écrit sur la signature du formulaire (1661)
- Pensées [Thoughts] (incomplete at death; publ. 1670)
- Discours sur les passions de l'amour [Discourse on the Passion of Love] (possible forgery)
- On the Conversion of the Sinner
- Ecrits sur la grace [Writings on Grace]

== See also ==
- Expected value
- Gambler's ruin
- List of pioneers in computer science
- List of works by Eugène Guillaume
- Pascal distribution
- Pascal's mugging
- Pascal's pyramid
- Pascal's simplex
- Problem of points
- Scientific Revolution
