= Port-Royal Abbey, Paris =

Christian monastery in France, 1204–1709

Coordinates: 48°50′19″N 2°20′18″E

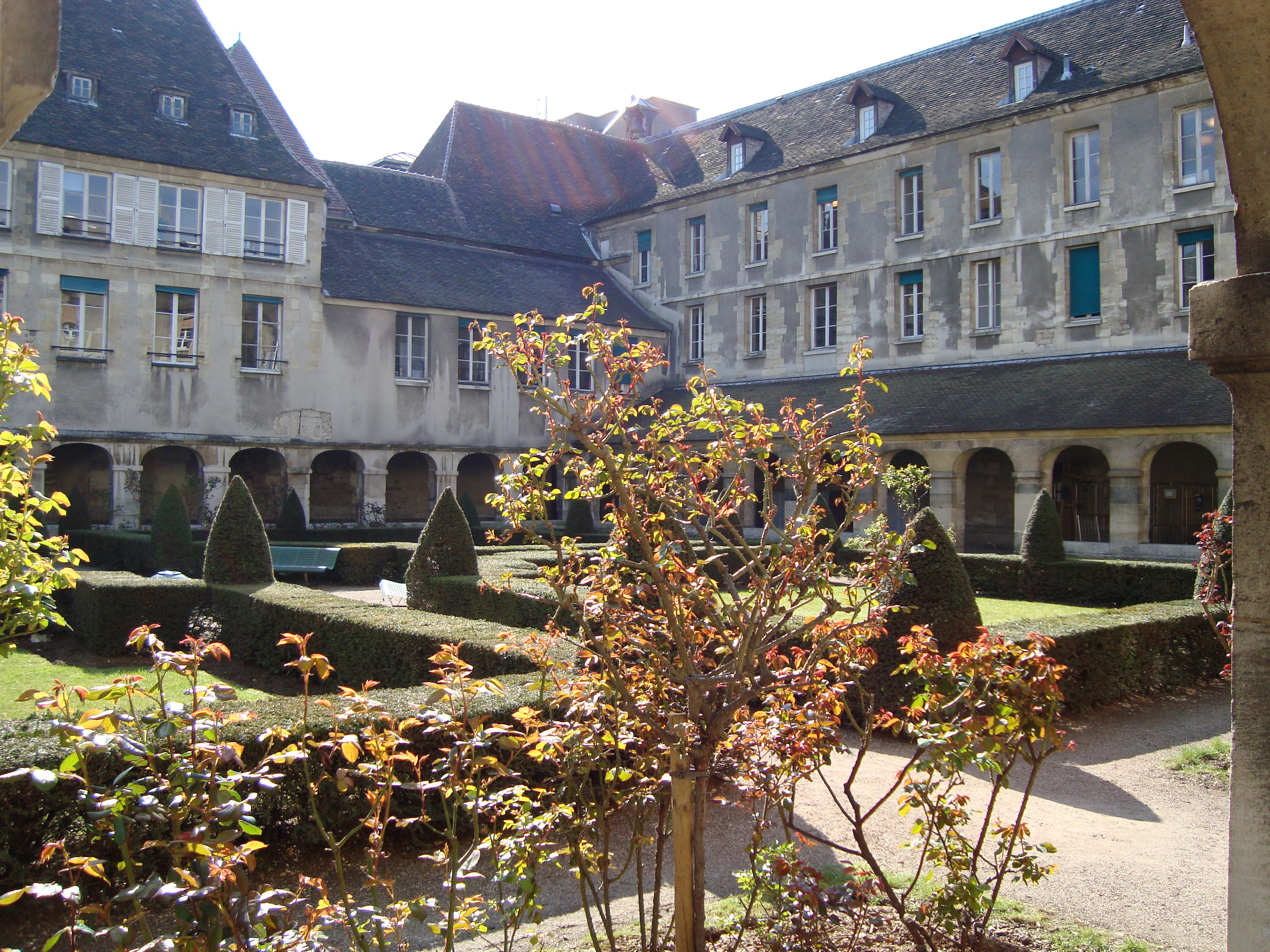
Cloister of the Port-Royal Abbey, now part of the Cochin Hospital

Port-Royal Abbey (French pronunciation: [pɔʁ ʁwajal]) was an abbey in Paris that was a stronghold of Jansenism. Cistercian nuns moved from the older abbey, Port-Royal-des-Champs, founded in 1204, to Paris and founded Port-Royal-de-Paris in 1626. There were frequent controversies as the sisters struggled against authorities in the church and at court. Some of the sisters returned to the medieval convent. Until it was dissolved in 1709, the Parisian abbey was highly influential and often in the news. It is today the site of an urban hospital, the Hopitâl Cochin.

== History ==
=== Origins of the Abbey ===
The buildings that housed the Abbey began as a private mansion. The Hôtel de Clagny was built by Pierre Lescot between 1566 and 1569 in the Faubourg Saint-Jacques in Paris. When he died in 1578, Léon Lescot, his nephew, inherited the property. On March 20, 1623, Léon gave Jehan Blondeau, his valet, and his great-nephew Robert de Romain, a cleric in the diocese of Meaux, "the vegetable garden and the gardens commonly called Claigny." By deed of July 19, 1624, Léon exchanged the Hôtel de Clagny with Angélique Arnauld, member of a prominent family of the noblesse du robe and abbess of Port Royal des Champs, for an annuity of 1,500 livres.

=== Cistercian nuns and Jansenism ===
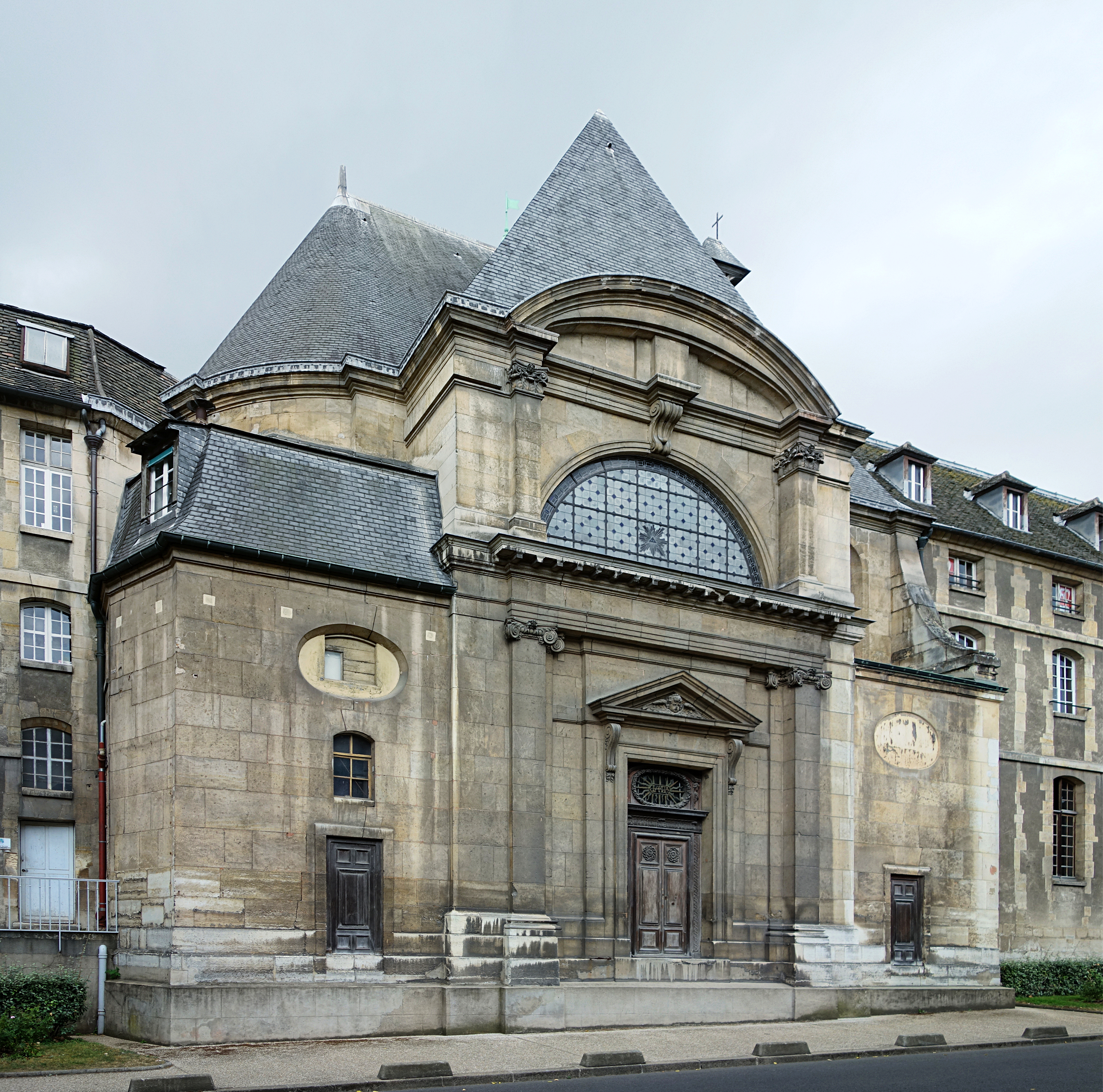
The Chapelle du Très Saint Sacrement

Angélique Arnauld, then aged 35, took possession of the Hôtel in 1625. The Hôtel de Clagny was remodeled around 1626 to accommodate the Cistercian convent of Port-Royal and thus relieve congestion at the mother house of Port-Royal des Champs in Magny-les-Hameaux in the Chevreuse valley. The church would be blessed in 1648 under the name of the Blessed Sacrament. The Chapel of the Très Saint Sacrement was built between 1646 and 1648, based on plans by the architect Antoine Lepautre. The cloister was built between 1652 and 1655.

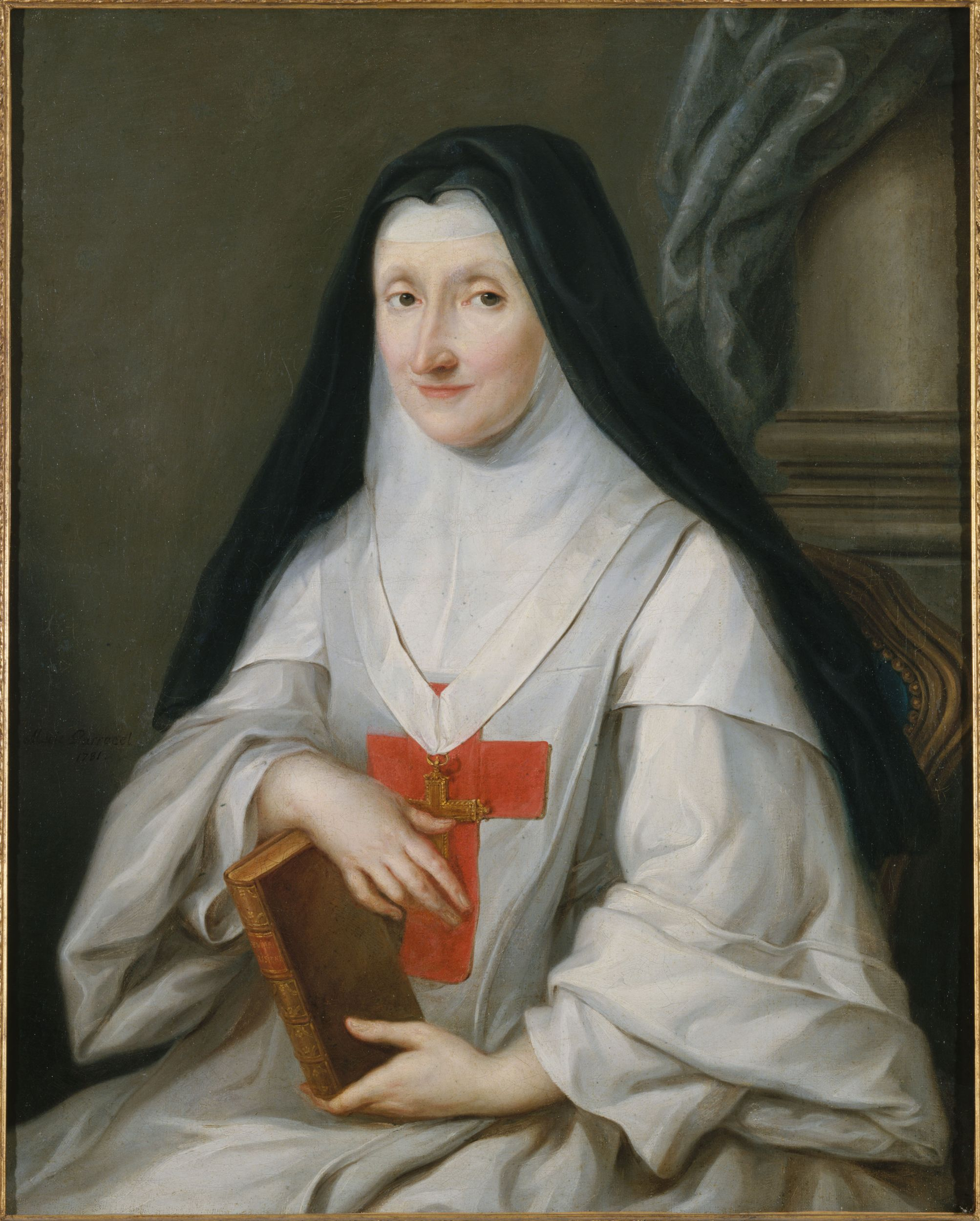
Madame de Montpeyroux, abbess of Port-Royal Abbey, Paris, wearing the habit of the nuns of Port Royal

As a result of this purchase, the Cistercian community of nuns was able to leave Port-Royal-des-Champs, thereby alleviating overcrowding and the risks of tuberculosis. In 1626, the abbey left the Cistercian Order and was placed under the authority of the Archdiocese of Paris. Sébastien Zamet, bishop of Langres, was one of the abbey's major advisors at the time and became its ecclesial protector. Angélique Arnauld retired in 1630. In addition to the urban monastery, the nuns established a further house of prayer, namely the Institut du Saint-Sacrement, which was officially recognized by church and state in 1633. It did not survive for long. When it merged again, the nuns of Port-Royal adopted the large red cross on the front of their scapulars. This adapted Cistercian habit became characteristic of Port-Royal.

The original abbey became known as Port-Royal-des-Champs. It was at times deserted, at other times occupied by men attracted to the circles around Port-Royal-de-Paris. They called themselves solitaires. Some of the nuns later returned to Port-Royal-des-Champs, so that by 1648 there were two prioresses (one for each location), but one abbess.

Both of the Port Royal abbeys were hotbeds of Jansenism, which embodied religious and political beliefs that were thought to be contrary to the interests of the monarchy and of the hierarchy of the Catholic Church. Angelique Arnault's younger brother, Antoine Arnault, was a theologian at the Sorbonne and a prominent Jansenist. He was expelled from the theological faculty for his beliefs. Jansenism was viewed as a threat or even heresy by much of the Roman Catholic hierarchy, especially the Jesuits. Since the Jansenists were also seen as threats to the monarchy, they were targeted by the royalty as well.

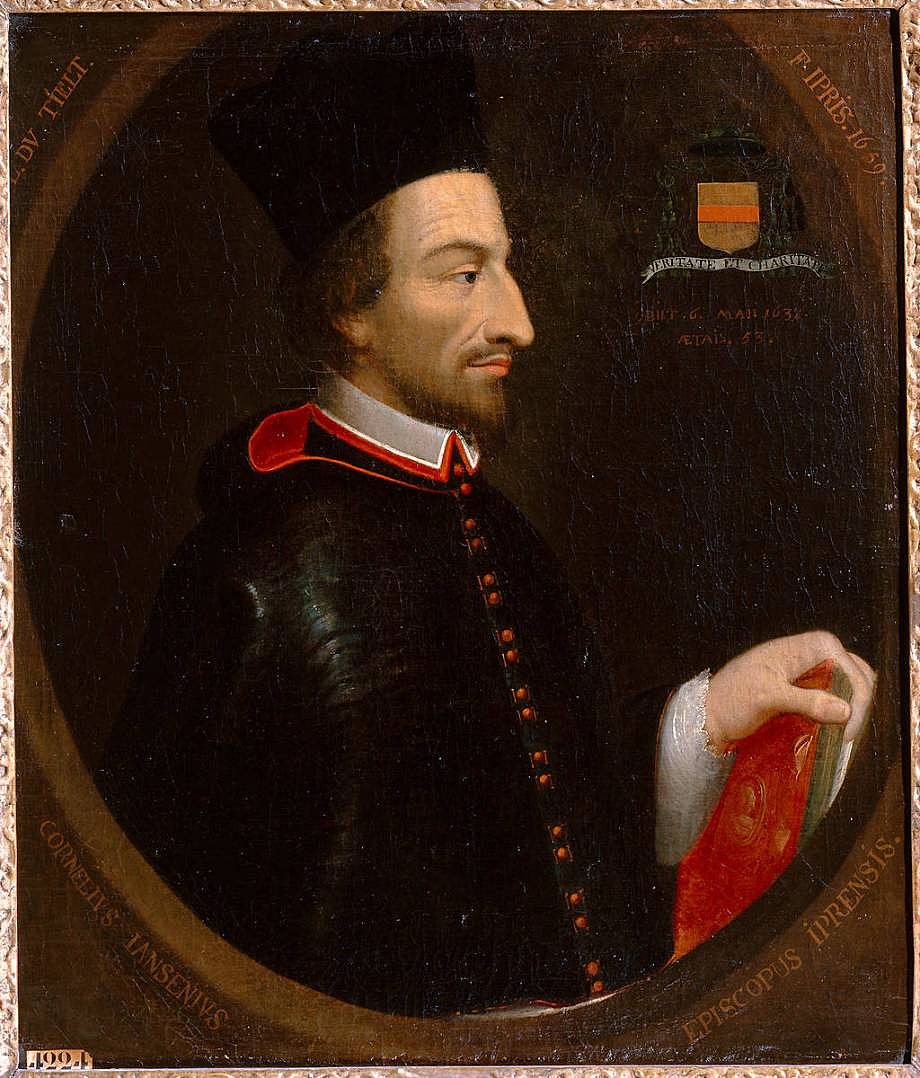
Cornelius Jansen (1585–1638), after whom Jansenism is named

The clash between the Jansenists (and, in particular the nuns of Port Royal) and their royal and ecclesiastical opponents lasted several decades. In 1661, the powerful Cardinal Mazarin died and Louis XIV seized full control of the government under the influence of his Jesuit confessor, Annat. In the same year Abbess Angélique died, while Blaise Pascal died in 1662, depriving the community of influential supporters. The Port Royal religious authorities managed to survive an initial serious controversy in the mid-17th century, when they arrived at a shaky truce with Louis XIV in 1669. During this controversy, the nuns of Port Royal were seen as stout defenders of their freedom of thought and they produced influential works on religious and philosophical subjects. In this context, Jansenism, and in particular the contributions of the nuns of Port Royal, influenced Enlightenment thinking in the struggle against royal absolutism and for freedom of conscience.

In August 1664, despite their considerable influence, the nuns who refused to disavow their Jansenist beliefs were expelled and replaced by the Visitandines until the French Revolution. Thus, the Port Royal religious communities were not able to withstand the combined antipathy of the Catholic Church and the French monarchy. Both of the Port Royal communities were dissolved by Clement XI in 1709. The buildings of the rural abbey, Port-Royal des Champs, were torn down on orders of the king, but the buildings of the Parisian abbey was preserved.

The convent of Port-Royal was closed in 1790. From 1793 remains of the abbey were used as a prison under the name Prison de Port-libre or Prison de la Bourbe. Chrétien Guillaume de Lamoignon de Malesherbes (lawyer for Louis XVI during his trial) and Madame de Tourzel, former governess of the "children of France", were held here.

=== Maternity wards and integration into the Cochin Hospital ===
==== Late 18th century ====
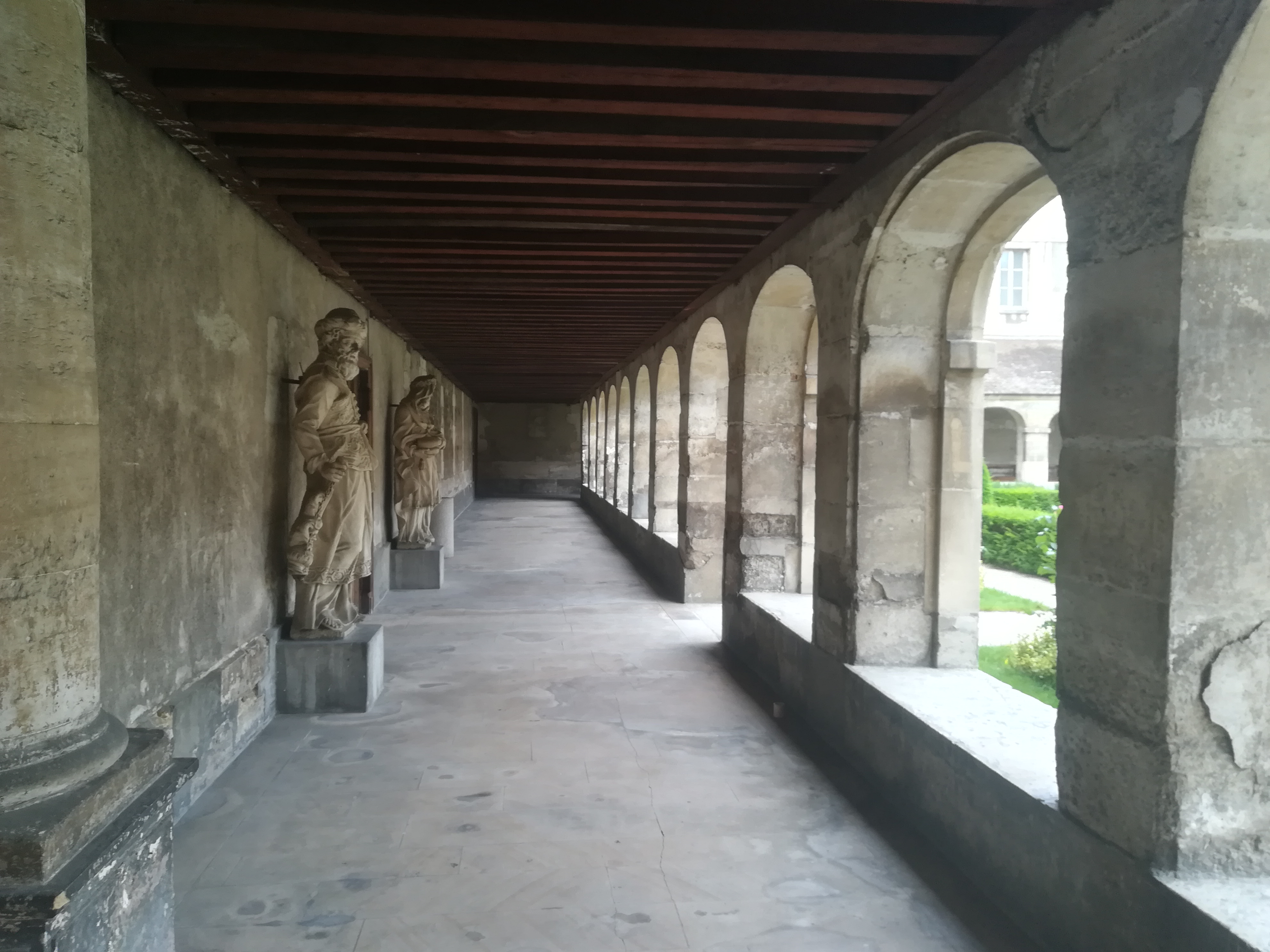
A wing of the cloisters in Port-Royal-de-Paris

In 1794, the French Convention founded the Maternity Hospital, which it installed in the buildings of the Val de Grâce convent (located in what is now the 5th arrondissement of Paris). The Foundling Hospital, on the parvis of Notre-Dame, was too small and was abandoned. The Maternity Hospital was put into service at Val-de-Grâce on July 13, 1795. A new decree of the Convention on 2 October 1795 converted Val-de-Grâce into a military hospital for the police and transferred the Maternity Hospital to two locations: the convent of Port-Royal in the Faubourg Saint-Jacques, and the Oratory (Saint-Vincent-de-Paul Hospital, originally a possession of the Society of the Oratory of Jesus) in the rue d'Enfer (the future avenue Denfert-Rochereau). On the 17 October 1795, the Maternity Hospital took possession of Port-Royal. The first pregnant women arrived there on 1 August 1796, while the buildings of the Oratory were still being fitted out for the new activity.

The Maternity Hospital at Port Royal merged two services previously located at the Hôtel-Dieu in Paris: the service for helping women in childbirth (obstetrics) and the service for combating the abandonment of newborns. Deliveries were shared between Port-Royal and the Hôtel-Dieu until December 1797; from that date, deliveries took place at the Oratory, while Port-Royal housed the breastfeeding section.

==== 19th century ====
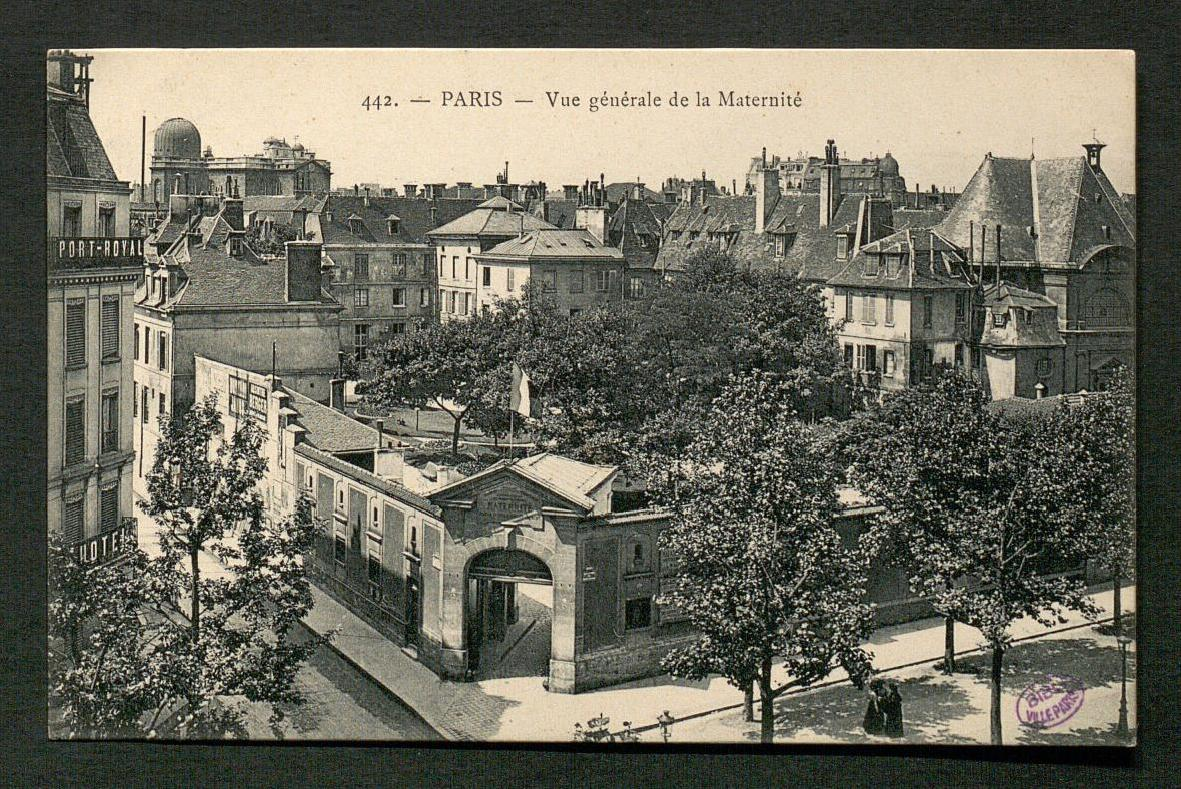
The Port-Royal Maternité

In 1814, the obstetric services were also transferred to Port-Royal, which was officially named the Maternité de Port-Royal.

In 1890, the Baudelocque clinic was created by the Faculty of Medicine of Paris and built in the gardens of the Maternité, to the west of the cloister. Its name recalls the role of Jean-Louis Baudelocque, professor of obstetrics at the end of the 18th century.

In addition to caring for pregnant women in labour, the Baudelocque clinic teaching clinic for medical students and a research center. Among its notable researchers was Adolphe Pinard, who revolutionized obstetric science with his communication on "intra-uterine childcare" (1895). This paper started the practice of consultations for pregnant women. On May 14, 1897, one of the very first radiography laboratories in France was inaugurated at the Clinic, along with that of Antoine Béclère at the Hôpital Tenon.

==== 20th century ====
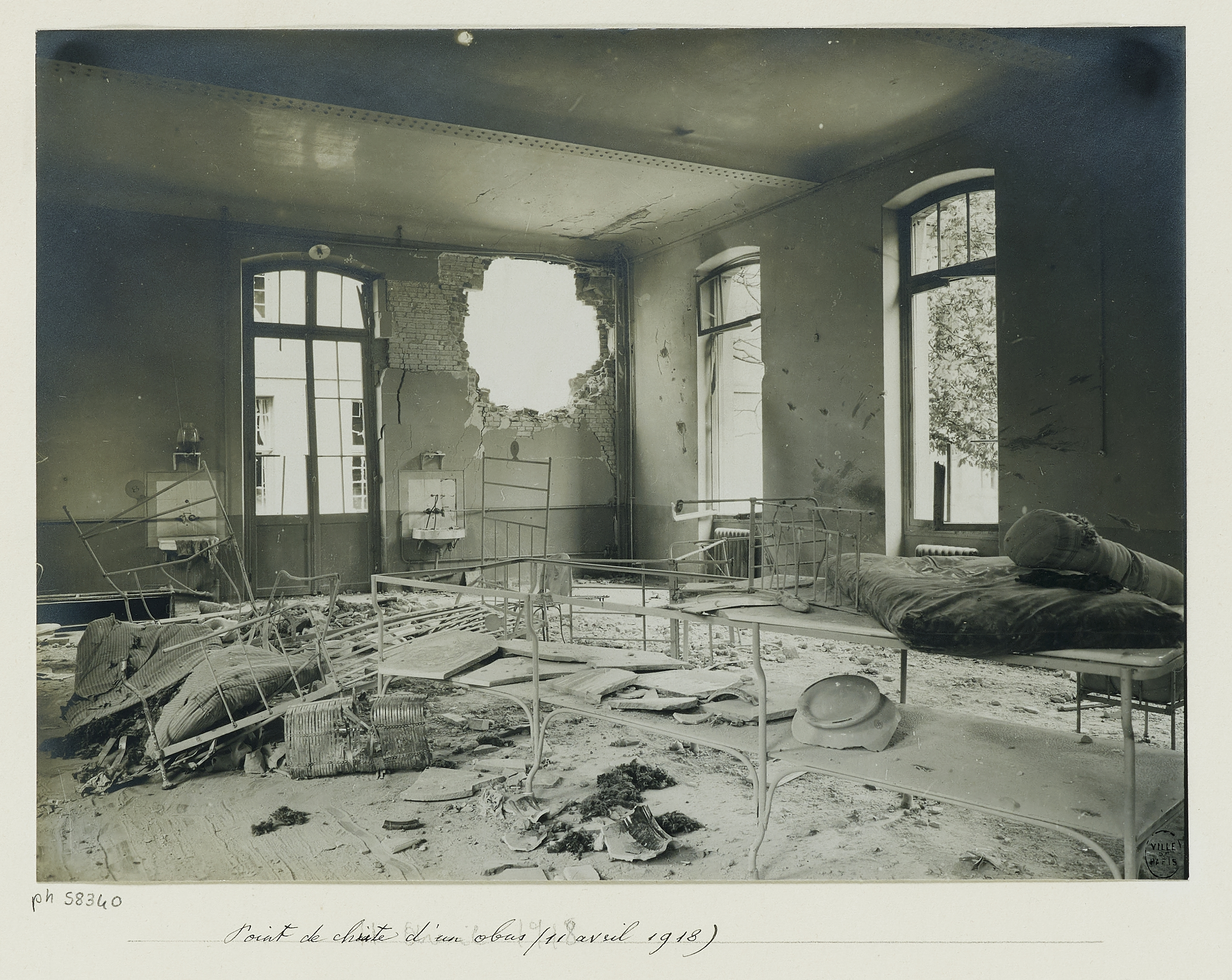
Maternity ward bombed by the Germans in 1918

During the bombing of Paris, on April 11, 1918, the Baudelocque clinic was hit by a German shell, causing 20 casualties.

In addition to being a department dedicated to childbirth enhanced by a consultation service, the Clinic's obstetrical clinic became a teaching center for medical students and a research center. New buildings were built from 1922 to 1929.

In the early 1950s, pediatrician and neonatologist Alexandre Minkowski created the first care center for premature babies at the Baudelocque maternity hospital. In 1955, alongside this clinical service, the "Biology of fetal and neonatal development" research laboratory of the INH/Claude-Bernard association was created, which became Inserm Research Unit 29 in 1964.

From 1960, two Baudelocque and Port-Royal maternities kept joint admission registers and were gradually attached to the Cochin hospital, forming part of the same hospital group.

In 1966, the Port-Royal Maternity Hospital was moved to new buildings. The cloister, chapel and chapter house of the former abbey were preserved and integrated into the Cochin hospital. The cloister currently houses the hospital administrationospital administration. Also in 1966, Alexandre Minkowski created the first intensive care and neonatology department in the Port-Royal building, a department that now bears his name.

The Baudelocque clinic buildings were demolished in 2007.

== Current uses and legacy ==
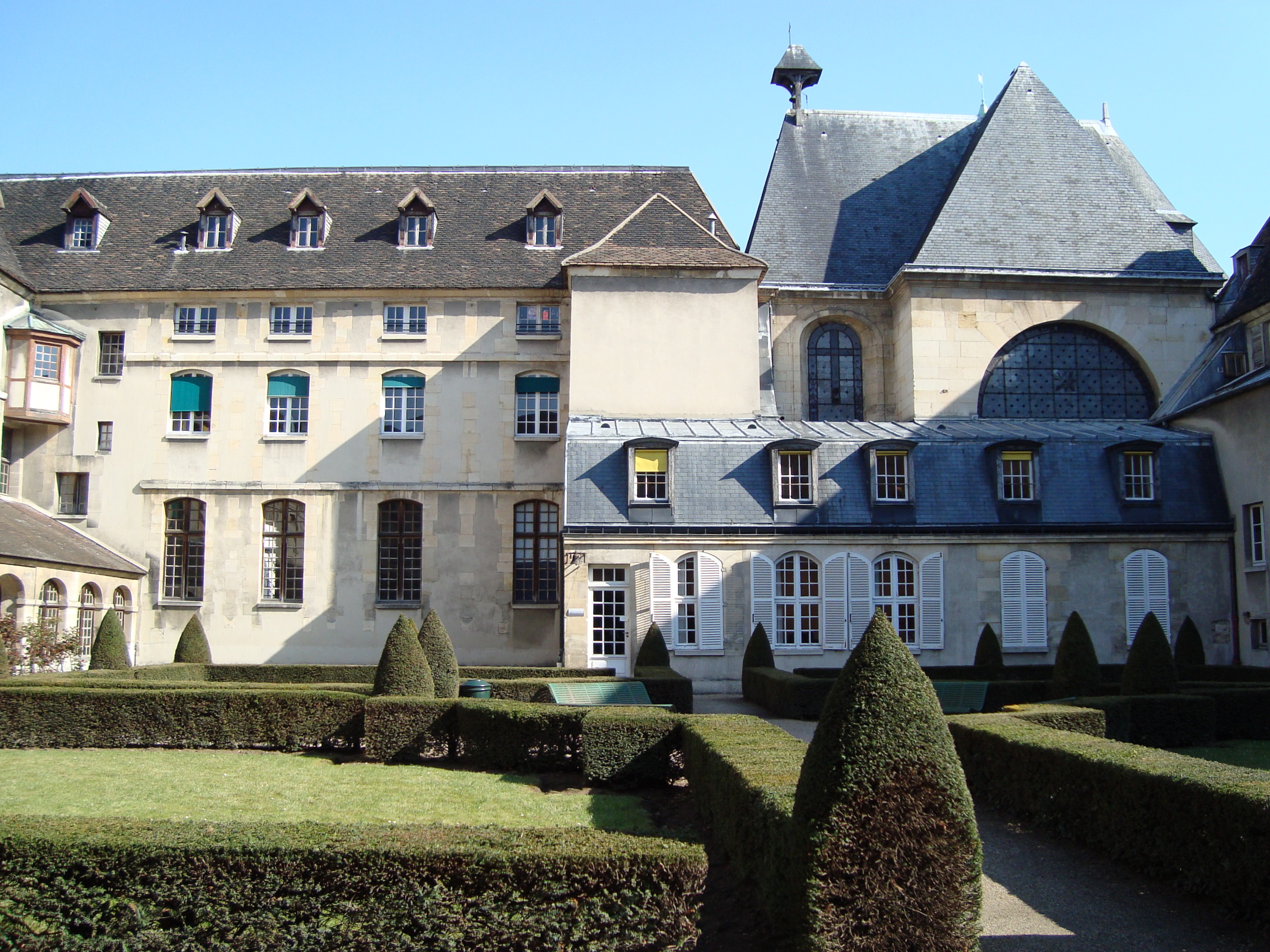
Another view of the cloister of the Abbey of Port Royal, now part of the Hospital Cochin in Paris

Today the Abbey's main cloister forms part of the modern Hôpital Cochin.

The details of monastic life at the abbey often inspired painters (Philippe de Champaigne and Louise Magdeleine Hortemels) and writers (Charles Augustin Sainte-Beuve). In 1954, Henry de Monthernant published a play called Port Royal.

The building has been listed as a French historical monument. By a decree of October 19, 1928, the facades of the buildings surrounding the chapel were listed and, by a decree of October 24, 1933, the chapel, the nuns' choir, the facades and roofs of the administration pavilion, the cloister and its area, the former chapter house were classified as historic monuments.
