= Münster =

City in North Rhine-Westphalia, Germany

Münster Mönster (Westphalian)
- City
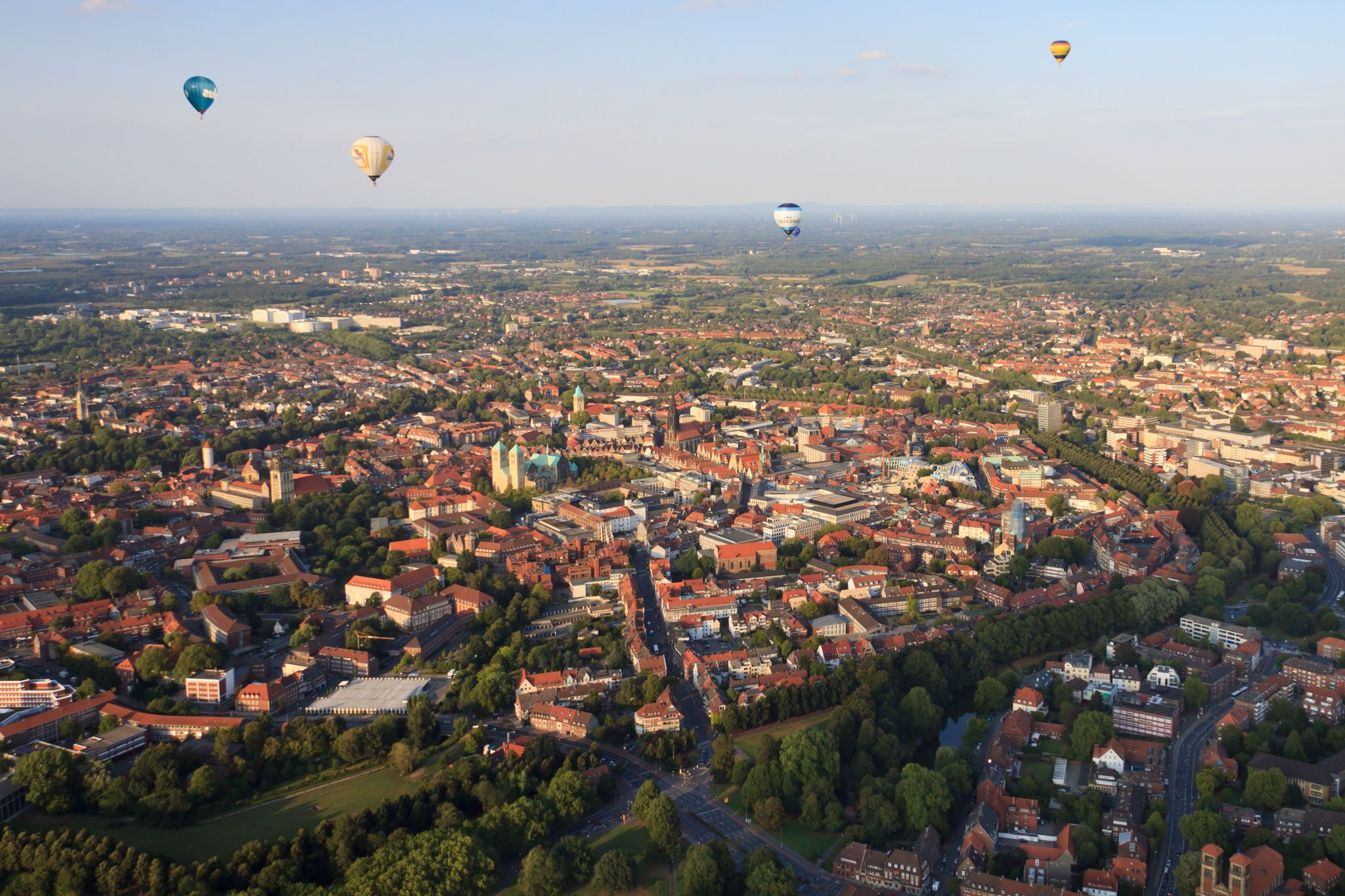
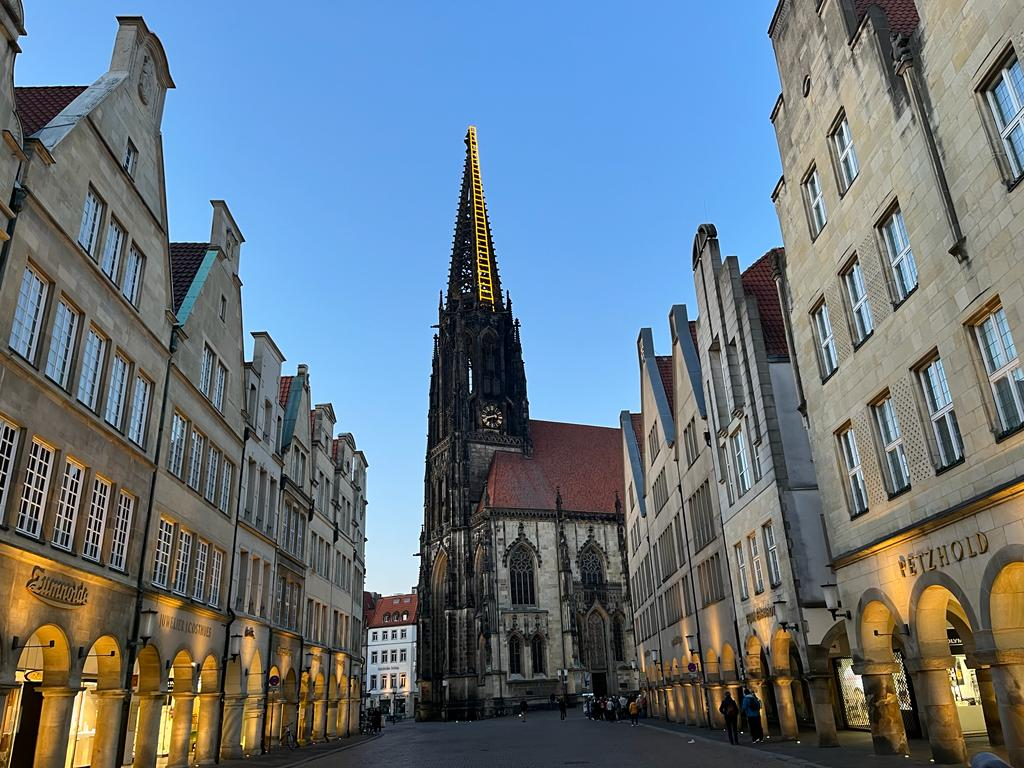
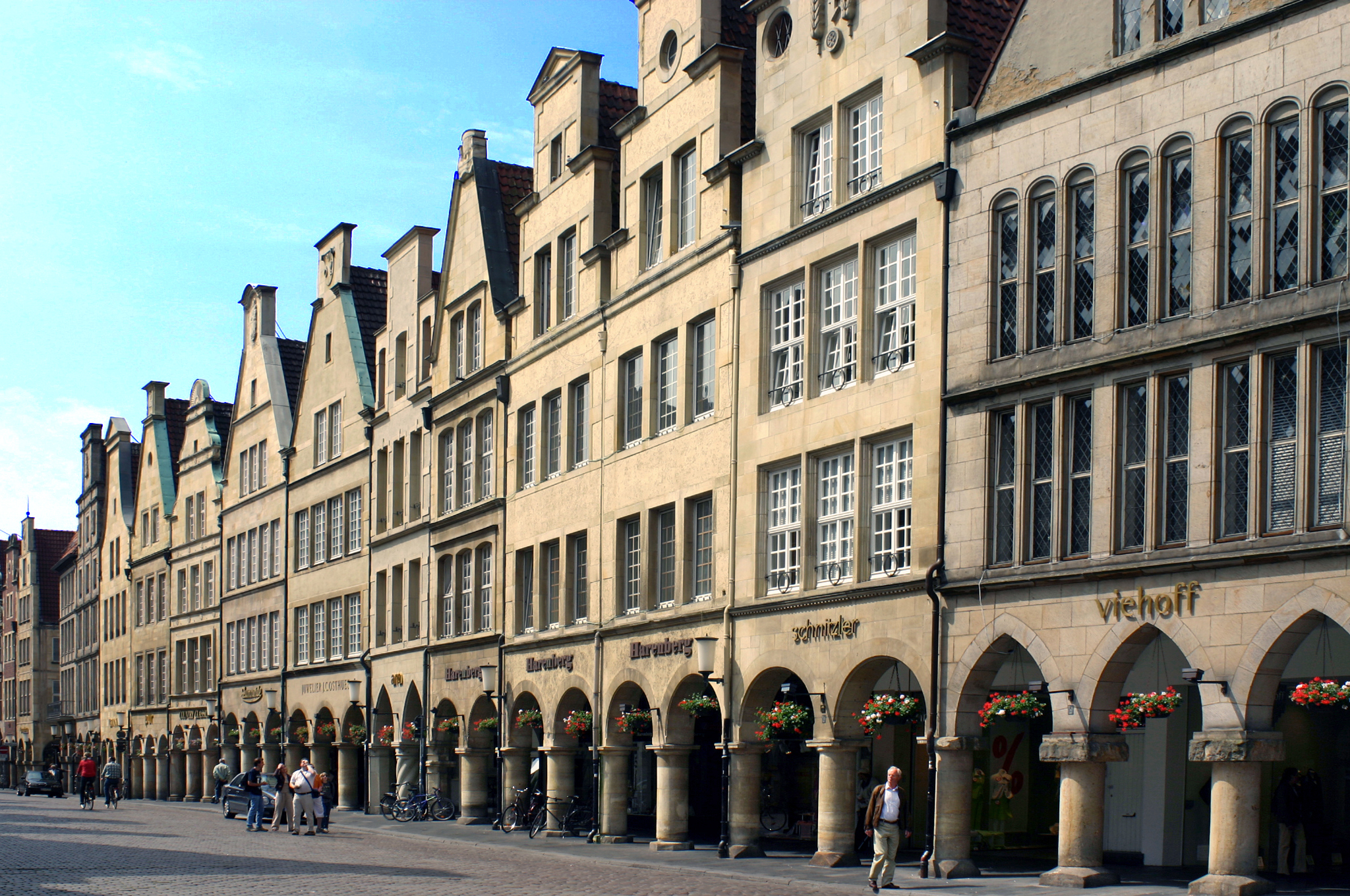
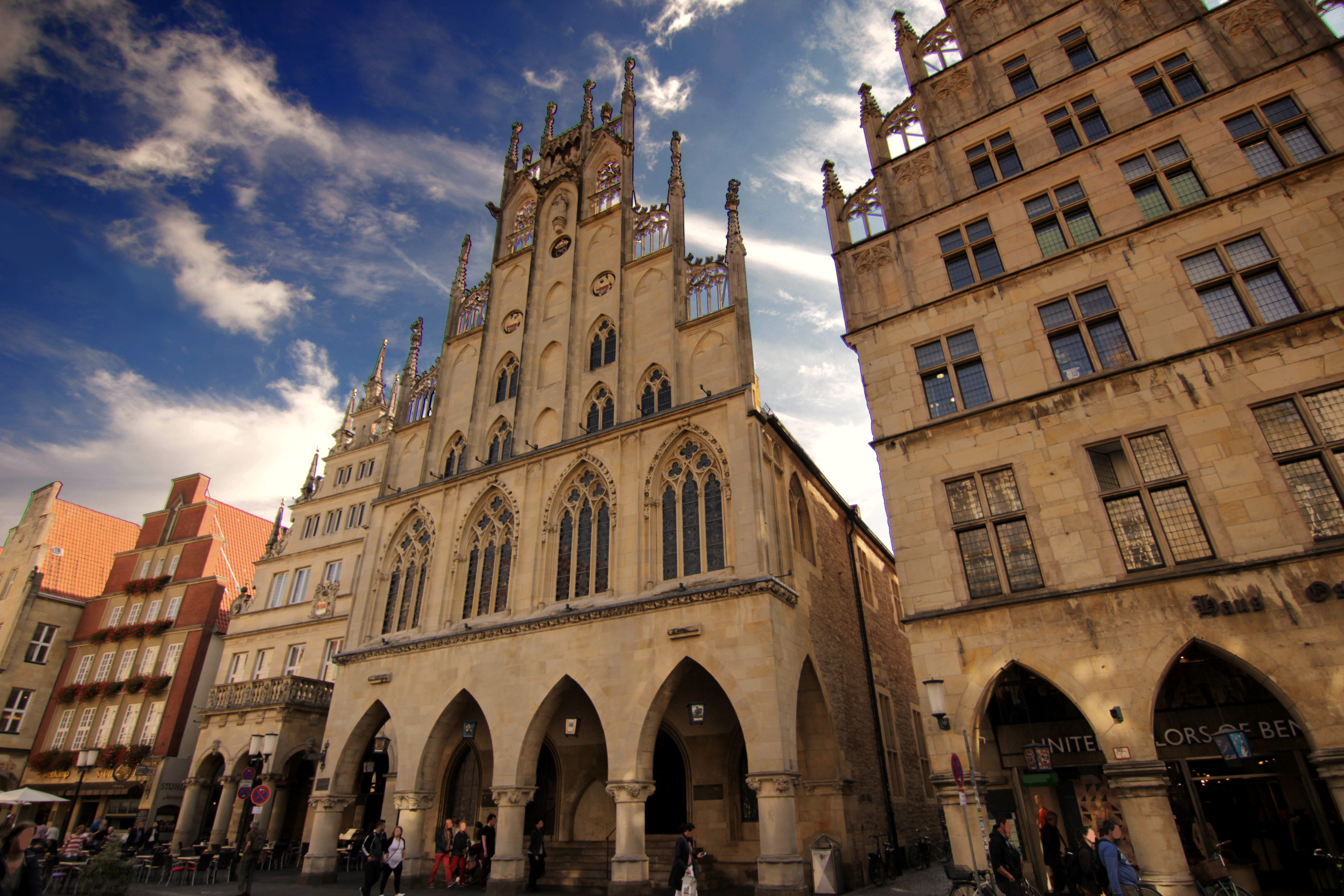
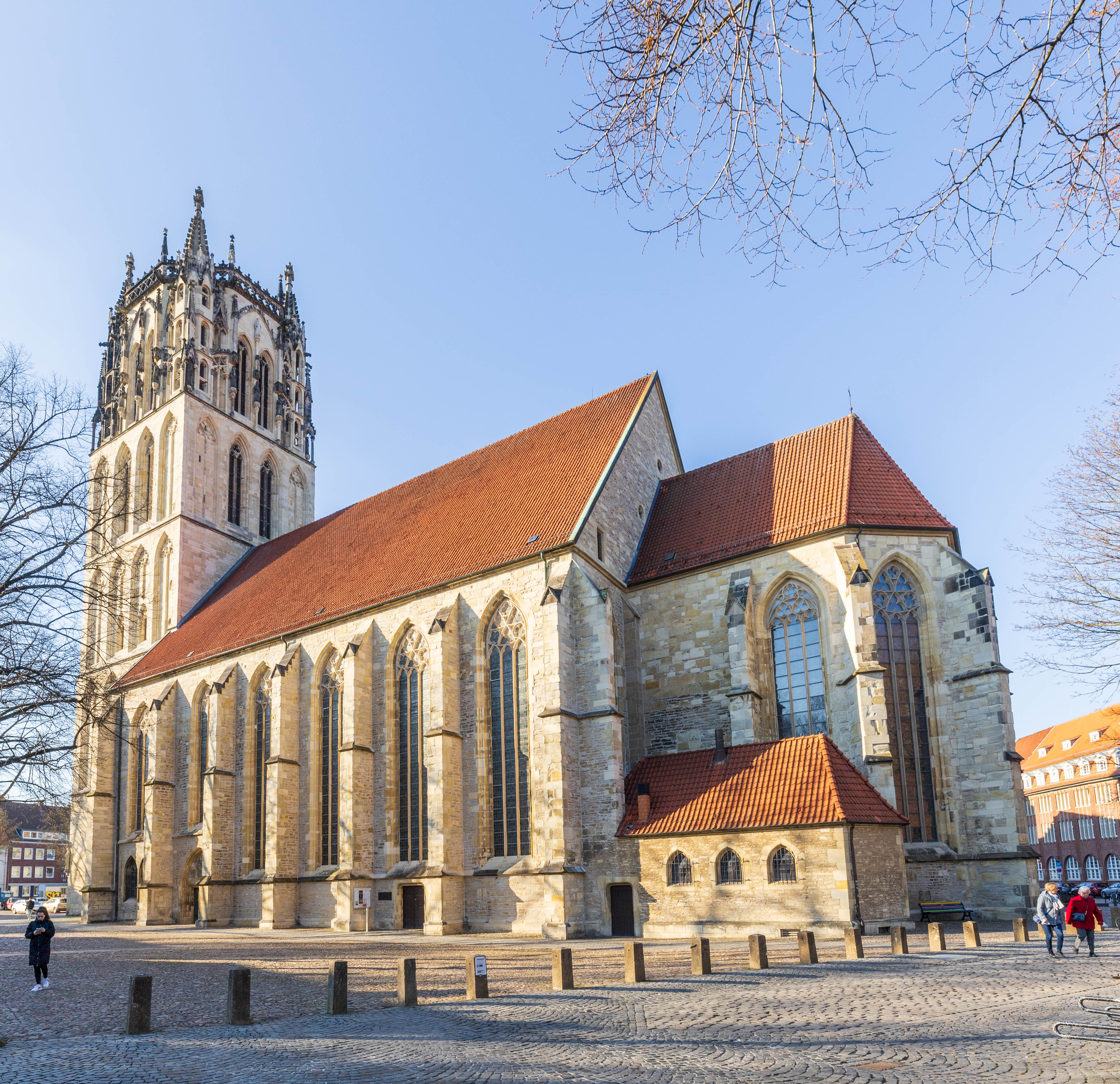
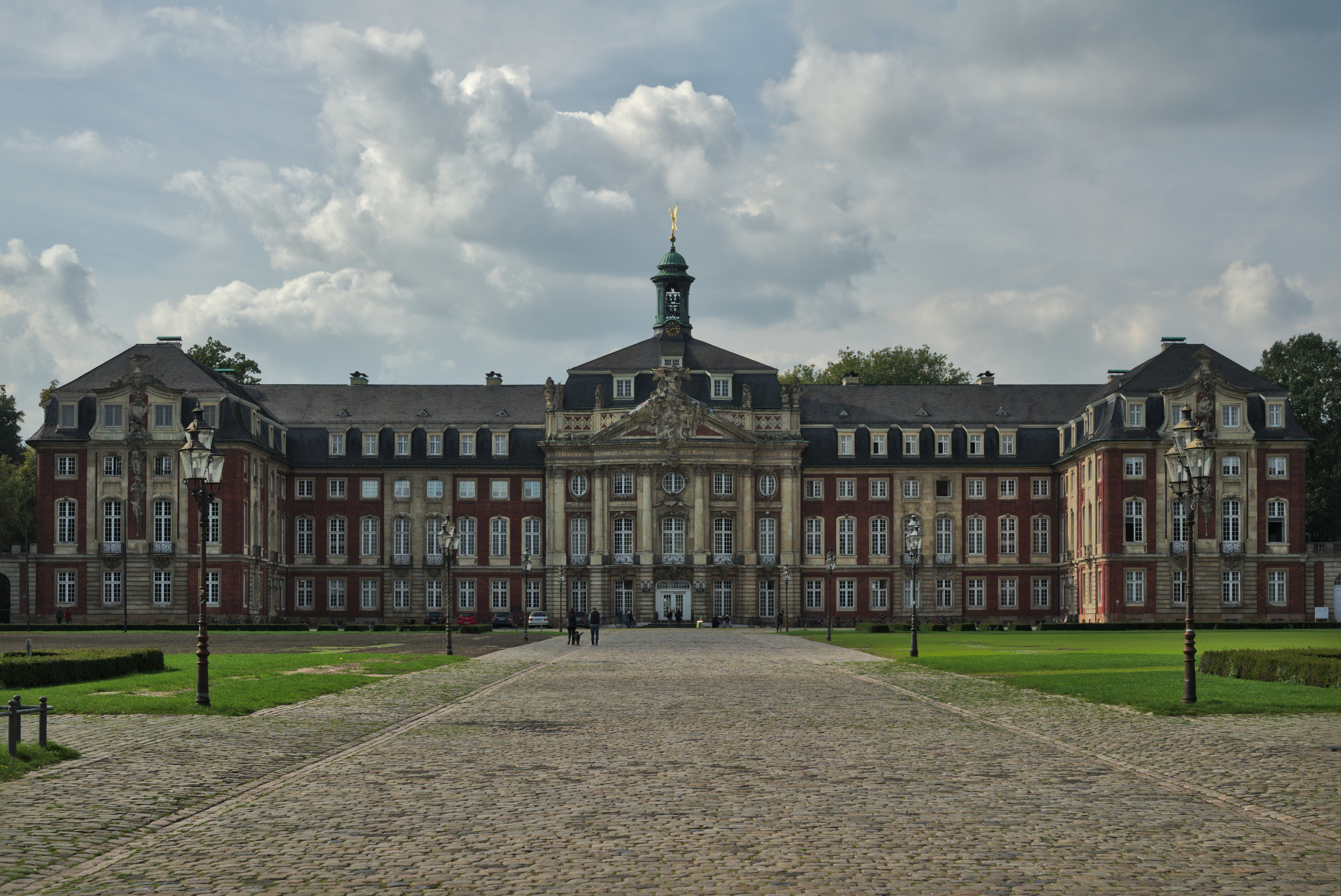
- Aerial view of Münster St Lambert's Church Prinzipalmarkt Historical City Hall Überwasserkirche Schloss Münster

- Flag Coat of arms
- Interactive map of Münster
- Location within Germany Location within North Rhine-Westphalia
- Coordinates: 51°57′45″N 07°37′32″E
- Country: Germany
- State: North Rhine-Westphalia
- Admin. region: Münster
- District: Urban district
- Founded: 793
- Subdivisions: 6

Government
  - Mayor (2025–30): Tilman Fuchs (Greens)
  - Governing parties: Greens/ SPD/ Volt

Area
  - Total: 303.28 km^{2} (117.10 sq mi)
- Elevation: 60 m (200 ft)

Population (2025-12-31)
  - Total: 306,368
  - Density: 1,010.2/km^{2} (2,616.4/sq mi)
- Time zone: UTC+01:00 (CET)
  - Summer (DST): UTC+02:00 (CEST)
- Postal codes: 48143–48167
- Dialling codes: 0251; 02501 (Hiltrup, Amelsbüren); 02506 (Wolbeck, Angelmodde); 02533 (Nienberge); 02534 (Roxel); 02536 (Albachten)
- Vehicle registration: MS
- Website: www.muenster.de

Münster (German: [ˈmʏnstɐ]; Westphalian: Mönster) is an independent city (Kreisfreie Stadt) in North Rhine-Westphalia, Germany. It is in the northern part of the state and the historic capital of the Westphalia region, as well being the centre of a state district. During the Protestant Reformation, Münster was the location of the Anabaptist rebellion. Münster and Osnabrück were the sites of the signing of the Treaties of Westphalia which ended the Thirty Years' War in 1648. Today, it is known as the bicycle capital of Germany.

Münster gained the status of a Großstadt (major city) with more than 100,000 inhabitants in 1915. As of 2014, there are 300,000 people living in the city, with about 61,500 students, only some of whom are recorded in the official population statistics as having their primary residence in Münster. Münster is a part of the international Euregio region with more than 1,000,000 inhabitants (Enschede, Hengelo, Gronau, Osnabrück).

== History ==
=== Early history ===
In 793, Charlemagne sent out Ludger as a missionary to evangelise the Münsterland. In 797, Ludger founded a school that later became the Cathedral School. Gymnasium Paulinum traces its history back to this school. Ludger was ordained as the first bishop of Münster. The first cathedral was completed by 850. The combination of ford and crossroad, market place, episcopal administrative centre, library and school, established Münster as an important centre. In 1040, Heinrich III became the first Holy Roman Emperor to visit Münster.

=== Middle Ages and early modern period ===
In the Middle Ages, the Prince-Bishopric of Münster was a leading member of the Hanseatic League.

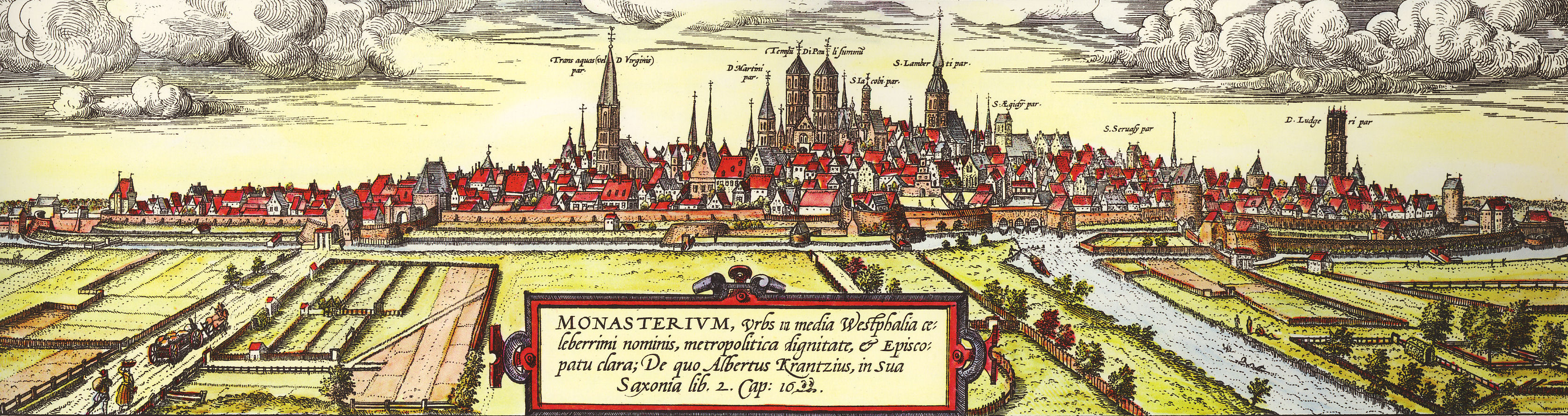
View from the south-west of Münster in 1570 as seen by Remigius Hogenberg. On the left is the Überwasserkirche, in the centre is St. Paul's Cathedral and to its right St. Lamberti, and on the far right is the Ludgerikirche.

In 1534, an apocalyptic Anabaptist sect, led by John of Leiden, took power in the Münster rebellion and founded a democratic proto-socialistic state. They claimed all property, burned all books except the Bible, and called it the "New Jerusalem". John of Leiden believed he would lead the elect from Münster to capture the entire world and purify it of evil with the sword in preparation for the Second Coming of Christ and the beginning of the Millennium. They went so far as to require all citizens to be naked as preparation for the Second Coming. However, the town was recaptured in 1535; the Anabaptists were tortured to death and their corpses were exhibited in metal baskets, which can still be seen hanging from the tower of St. Lambert's Church.

Part of the signing of the Peace of Westphalia of 1648 was held in Münster. This ended the Thirty Years' War and the Eighty Years' War. It also guaranteed the future of the prince-bishop and the diocese; the area was to be exclusively Roman Catholic.

=== Eighteenth, nineteenth and early twentieth centuries ===
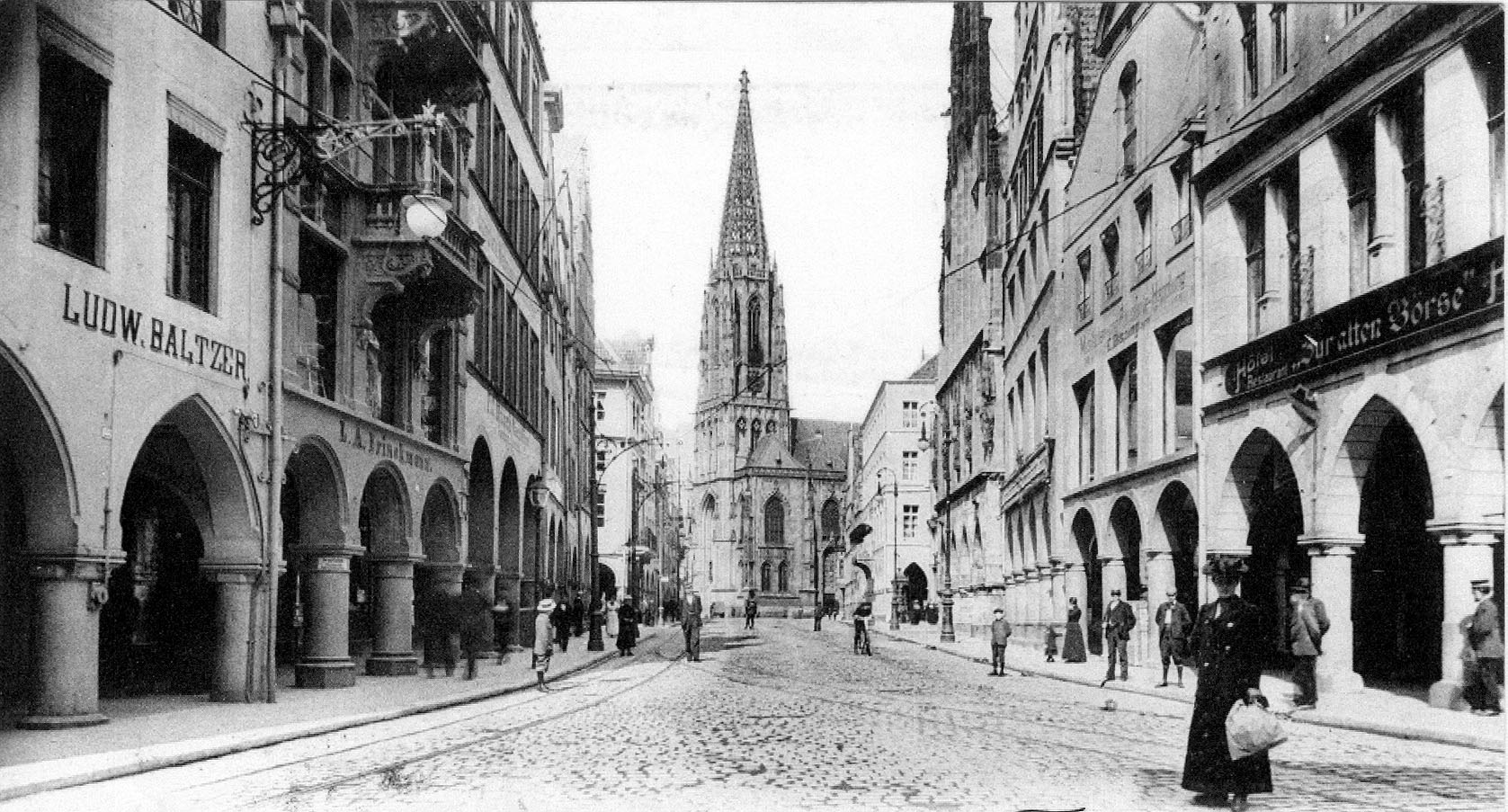
Photo of the Prinzipalmarkt in 1900

The last outstanding palace of the German baroque period, the Schloss Münster, was created according to plans by Johann Conrad Schlaun. The University of Münster (called "Westfälische Wilhelms-Universität Münster", WWU, between 1907 and 2023) was established in 1780. It is now a major European centre for excellence in education and research with large faculties in the arts, humanities, theology, sciences, business and law. Currently there are about 40,000 undergraduate and postgraduate students enrolled.

In 1802 Münster was conquered by Prussia during the Napoleonic Wars. It was also part of the Grand Duchy of Berg between 1806 and 1811 and the Lippe department of the First French Empire between 1811 and 1813, before returning to Prussian rule. It became the capital of the Prussian province of Westphalia. In 1899 the city's harbour started operations when the city was linked to the Dortmund-Ems Canal.

=== World War II ===
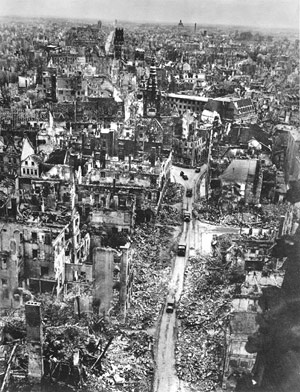
Photo of part of the Prinzipalmarkt area around St. Lambert's church in 1945

In the 1940s the Bishop of Münster, Cardinal Clemens August Graf von Galen, was one of the most prominent critics of the Nazi government. In retaliation for his success (The New York Times described Bishop von Galen as "the most obstinate opponent of the National Socialist anti-Christian program"), Münster was heavily garrisoned during World War II, and five large complexes of barracks are still a feature of the city. Münster was the headquarters (Hauptsitz) for the 6th Military District (Wehrkreis) of the German Wehrmacht, under the command of Infantry General (General der Infanterie) Gerhard Glokke. Originally made up of Westphalia and the Rhineland, after the Battle of France it was expanded to include the Eupen – Malmedy district of Belgium. The headquarters controlled military operations in Münster, Essen, Düsseldorf, Wuppertal, Bielefeld, Coesfeld, Paderborn, Herford, Minden, Detmold, Lingen, Osnabrück, Recklinghausen, Gelsenkirchen, and Cologne.

Münster was the home station for the VI and XXIII Infantry Corps (Armeekorps), as well as the XXXIII and LVI Panzerkorps. Münster was also the home of the 6th, 16th and 25th Panzer Division; the 16th Panzergrenadier Division; and the 6th, 26th, 69th, 86th, 106th, 126th, 196th, 199th, 211th, 227th, 253rd, 254th, 264th, 306th, 326th, 329th, 336th, 371st, 385th, and 716th Infantry Divisions (Infanterie-division).

Münster was the location of the Oflag VI-D prisoner-of-war camp mostly for French, but also some Polish and Soviet officers, and a Nazi prison with several forced labour subcamps in the city and other localities.

The city was hit in one of the first “City Busting” missions of the U.S. 8th Air Force on October 10, 1943. Much of the city center and the railway yard was heavily damaged in the raid, but heavy casualties were inflicted against the American heavy bombers, with the 100th Bomb Group losing 13 of the 14 B-17s that took part in the raid.

A secondary target of the Oil Campaign of World War II, Münster was bombed on 25 October 1944 by 34 diverted B-24 Liberator bombers, during a mission to a nearby primary target, the Scholven/Buer synthetic oil plant at Gelsenkirchen. About 63 per cent of the city including 91 per cent of the Old City was destroyed by Allied air raids. The US 17th Airborne Division, fighting as infantry, attacked Münster with the British 6th Guards Tank Brigade on 2 April 1945 and fought its way into the city centre, which was captured in house-to-house fighting on the following day.

=== Postwar period ===
From 1946 to 1998, there was a Latvian secondary school in Münster, and in 1947, one of the largest of about 93 Latvian libraries in the West was established in Münster. In the 1950s the Old City was rebuilt to match its pre-war state, though many of the surrounding buildings were replaced with cheaper modern structures. It was also for several decades a garrison town for the British forces stationed in West Germany.

=== Post-reunification ===
In 2004, Münster won an honourable distinction: the LivCom-Award for the most livable city in the world with a population between 200,000 and 750,000. Münster is famous and liked for its bicycle friendliness and for the student character of the city that is due to the influence of its university, the University of Münster.

== Geography ==
=== Geographic position ===
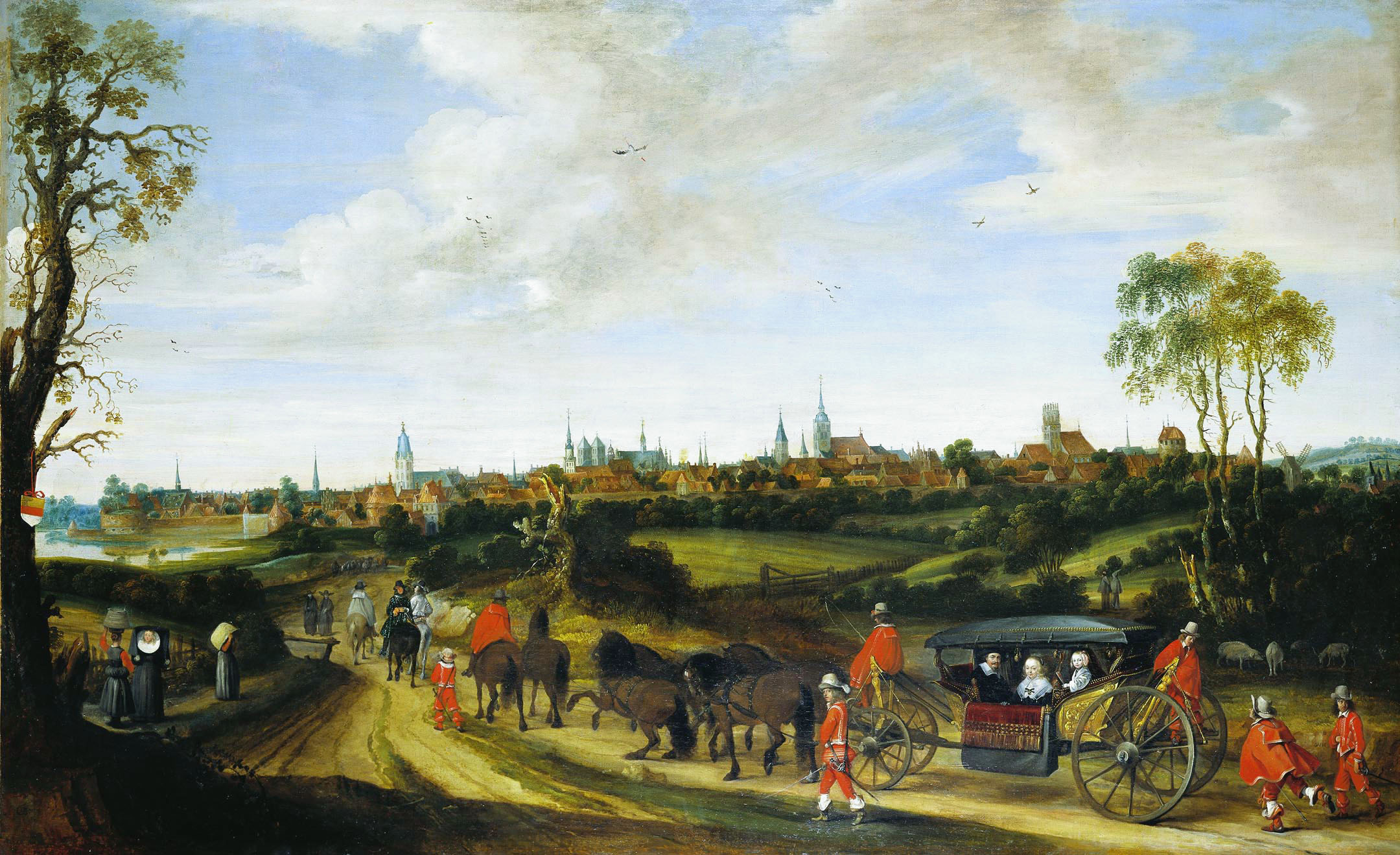
Gerard ter Borch: Dutch envoy Adriaan Pauw enters Münster around 1646 for the peace negotiations resulting in the Peace of Westphalia (Stadtmuseum Münster).

Münster is situated on the river Aa, approximately 15 kilometres (9 miles) south of its confluence with the Ems in the so-called Westphalian Bight, a landscape studded with dispersed settlements and farms – the "Münsterland". The Wolstonian sediments of the mountain ridge called "Münsterländer Kiessandzug" cross the city from north to south. The highest elevation is the Mühlenberg in the northwest of Münster, 97 metres above sea level. The lowest elevation is at the Ems, 44 m above sea level. The city centre is 60 m above sea level, measured at the Prinzipalmarkt in front of the historic city hall.

The Dutch city of Enschede lies about 65 km (40 mi) northwest of Münster. Other major cities nearby include Osnabrück, about 44 km (27 mi) to the north, Dortmund, about 61 km (38 mi) to the south, and Bielefeld, about 62 km (39 mi) to the east.

Münster is one of the 42 agglomeration areas and one of Germany's biggest cities in terms of area. But it includes substantial sparsely populated rural districts which were formerly separate local government authorities until they were amalgamated in 1975. Thus nearly half the city's area is agricultural, resulting in a low population-density of approximately 900 inhabitants per km^{2}.

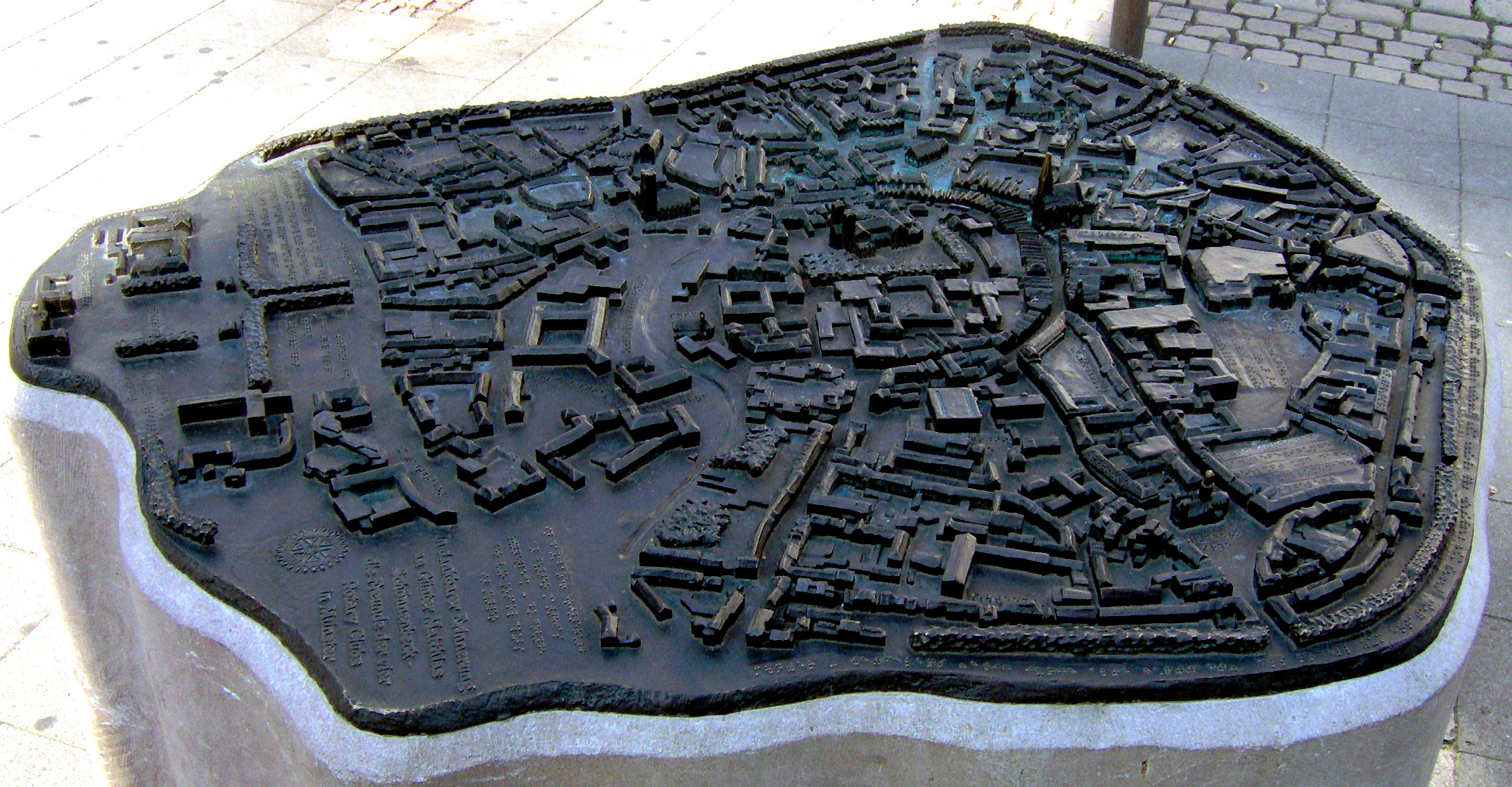
Bronze model of Münster's city centre

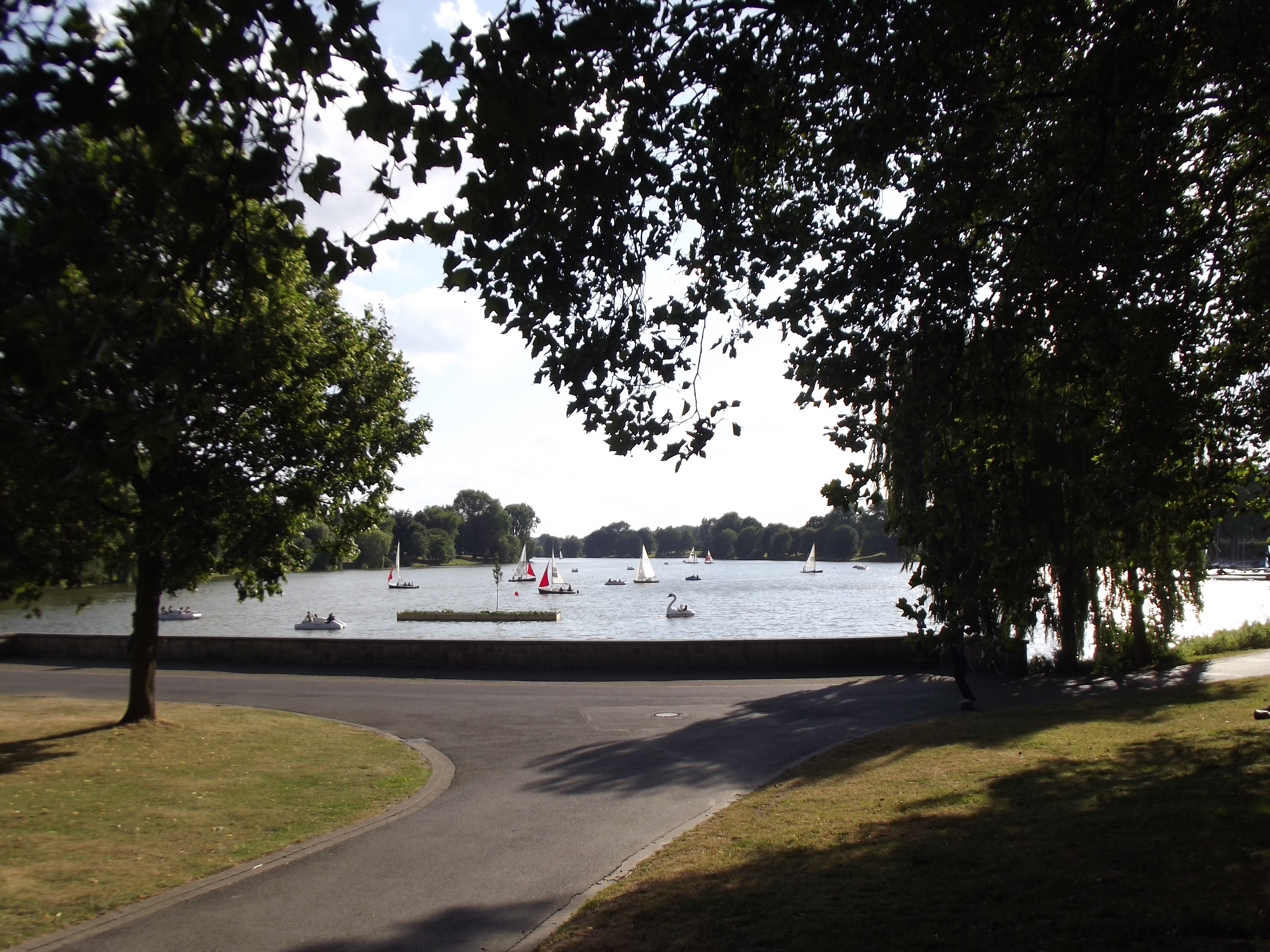
Münster's Lake Aa

=== Population density ===
The city's built-up area is quite extensive. There are no skyscrapers and few high-rise buildings but very many detached houses and mansions. Still the population density reaches about 15,000 inhabitants per km^{2} in the city centre. Calculating the population density based on the actual populated area results in approximately 2890 inhabitants per km^{2}.

Münster's urban area of 302.91 square kilometres (116.95 sq mi) is distributed into 57.54 square kilometres (22.22 sq mi) covered with buildings while 0.99 km^{2} (0.38 sq mi) are used for maintenance and 25.73 km^{2} (9.93 sq mi) for traffic areas, 156.61 km^{2} (60.47 sq mi) for agriculture and recreation, 8.91 km^{2} (3.44 sq mi) are covered by water, 56.69 km^{2} (21.89 sq mi) is forested and 6.23 km^{2} (2.41 sq mi) is used otherwise. The perimeter has a length of 107 kilometres (66 miles), the largest extend of the urban area in north–south direction is 24.4 km (15.2 mi), in east–west direction 20.6 km (12.8 mi).

=== Climate ===
A well-known saying in Münster is "Entweder es regnet oder es läuten die Glocken. Und wenn beides zusammen fällt, dann ist Sonntag" ("Either it rains or the church bells ring. And if both occur at the same time, it's Sunday."), but in reality the rainfall with approximately 758 mm (29.8 inches) per year is close to the average rainfall in Germany. The perception of Münster as a rain-laden city isn't caused by the absolute amount of rainfall but by the above-average number of rainy days with relatively small amounts of rainfall. The average temperature is 9.4 °C (48.9 °F) with approximately 1500 sun hours per year. Consequently, Münster is in the bottom fifth in comparison with other German cities. The winter in Münster is fairly mild and snowfall is unusual. The temperature during summertime meets the average in Germany. The highest daily rainfall was registered on 28 July 2014: One weather station of the MeteoGroup reported a rainfall of 122.2 L/m^{2} (2.50 imp gal/sq ft); the State Environment Agency registered at one of its stations 292 L/m^{2} (6.0 imp gal/sq ft) during seven hours. The record rainfall led to severe flooding throughout the city and the nearby Greven.

Climate data for Münster (Münster Osnabrück Airport) (1991–2020 normals)
Month	Jan	Feb	Mar	Apr	May	Jun	Jul	Aug	Sep	Oct	Nov	Dec	Year
Mean daily maximum °C (°F)	5.2 (41.4)	6.2 (43.2)	10.1 (50.2)	15.0 (59.0)	18.9 (66.0)	21.8 (71.2)	24.2 (75.6)	23.7 (74.7)	19.5 (67.1)	14.5 (58.1)	9.1 (48.4)	5.8 (42.4)	14.5 (58.1)
Daily mean °C (°F)	2.7 (36.9)	3.1 (37.6)	5.9 (42.6)	9.9 (49.8)	13.7 (56.7)	16.6 (61.9)	18.7 (65.7)	18.3 (64.9)	14.5 (58.1)	10.4 (50.7)	6.3 (43.3)	3.5 (38.3)	10.3 (50.5)
Mean daily minimum °C (°F)	0.0 (32.0)	0.0 (32.0)	1.9 (35.4)	4.6 (40.3)	8.2 (46.8)	11.2 (52.2)	13.4 (56.1)	13.0 (55.4)	9.9 (49.8)	6.6 (43.9)	3.3 (37.9)	0.9 (33.6)	6.1 (43.0)
Average precipitation mm (inches)	64.5 (2.54)	49.2 (1.94)	49.6 (1.95)	40.5 (1.59)	54.8 (2.16)	63.4 (2.50)	73.9 (2.91)	78.5 (3.09)	68.7 (2.70)	63.1 (2.48)	61.5 (2.42)	67.8 (2.67)	735.7 (28.96)
Average precipitation days (≥ 1.0 mm)	17.6	15.8	15.4	13.5	13.7	14.9	15.2	15.2	14.3	15.6	17.8	19.1	188.1
Average snowy days (≥ 1.0 cm)	4.6	3.6	1	0	0	0	0	0	0	0	0.5	3.3	13
Average relative humidity (%)	85.5	82.2	76.9	69.8	69.3	71.1	71.0	73.2	79.6	83.8	87.1	87.3	78.1
Mean monthly sunshine hours	51.6	73.3	124.2	178.4	206.7	203.2	212.3	193.3	148.2	108.8	57.1	44.2	1,597.6
Source: World Meteorological Organization

=== Adjacent cities and districts ===
Münster borders on the following cities and municipalities, named clockwise and beginning in the northwest: Altenberge and Greven (District of Steinfurt), Telgte, Everswinkel, Sendenhorst and Drensteinfurt (District of Warendorf), as well as Ascheberg, Senden and Havixbeck (District of Coesfeld).

=== City boroughs ===
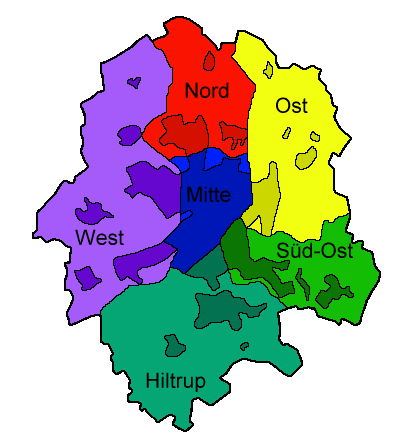
Münster administrative districts. The darker parts represent the built-up areas of the city.

The city is divided into six administrative districts or Stadtbezirke: "Mitte" (Middle), "Nord" (North), "Ost" (East), "West", "Süd-Ost" (South-East) and "Hiltrup". Each district is represented by a council of 19 representatives elected in local elections. Heading each council is the district mayor, or Bezirksvorsteher. Every district is subdivided into residential quarters (Wohnbereiche). This official term, however, is not used in common speech, as there are no discrete definitions of the individual quarters. The term "Stadtteil" is used instead, mainly referring to the incorporated communities. The districts are also divided into 45 statistical districts.

The following list names each district with its residential and additional quarters. These are the official names, which partly differ from the usage in common speech.

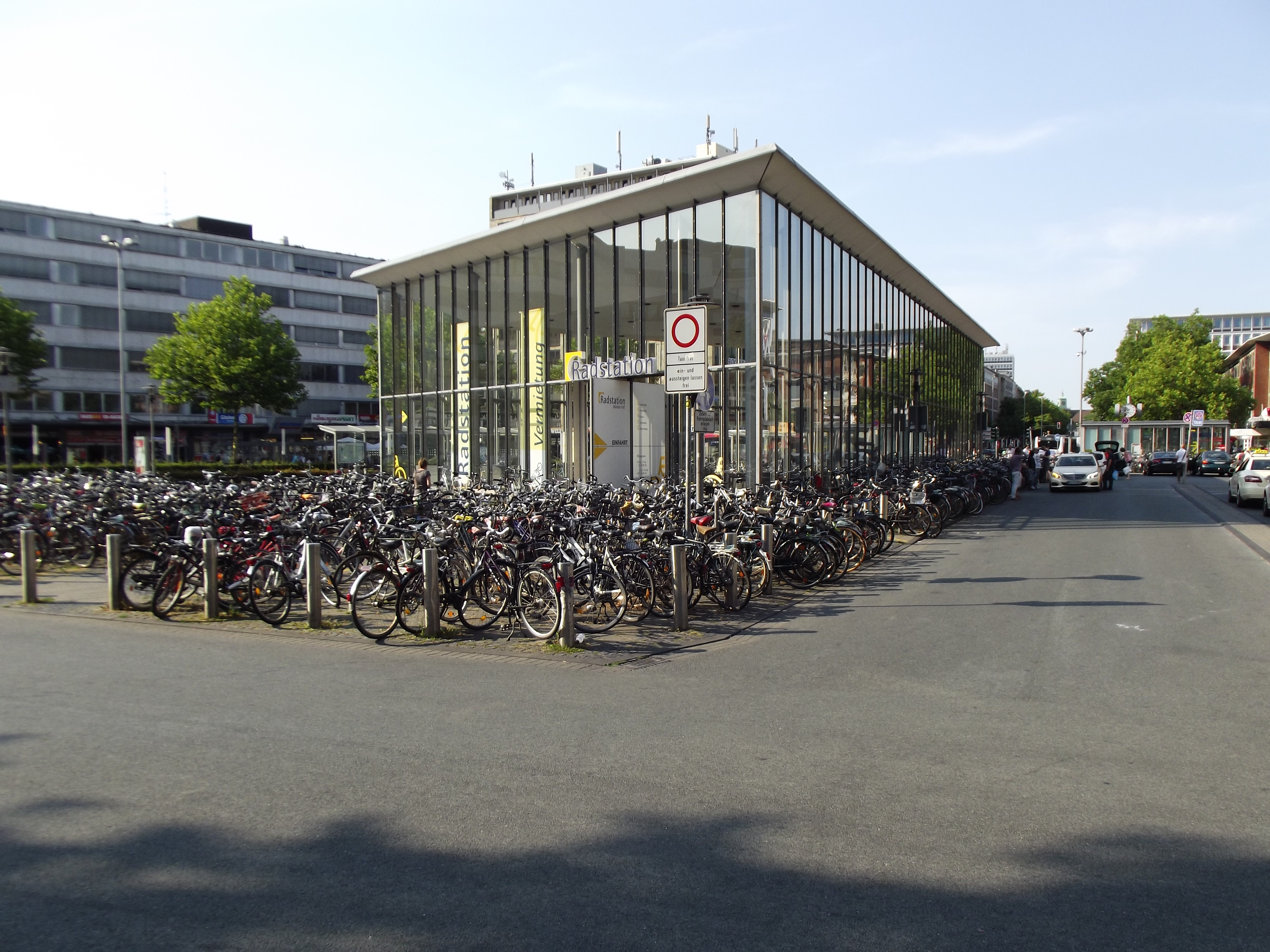
Bicycle parking station, located at the Hauptbahnhof

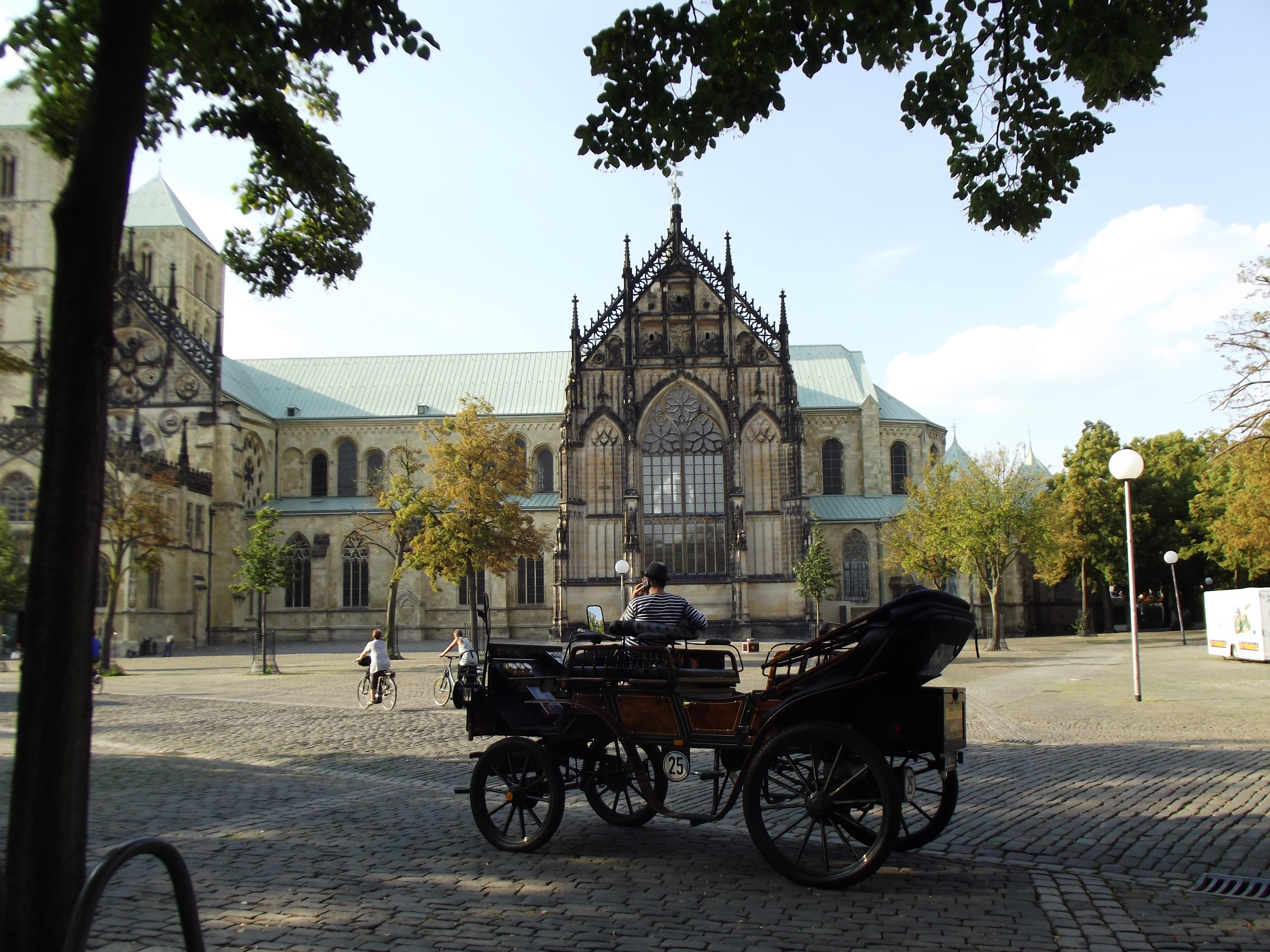
Market Square Münster, Centre

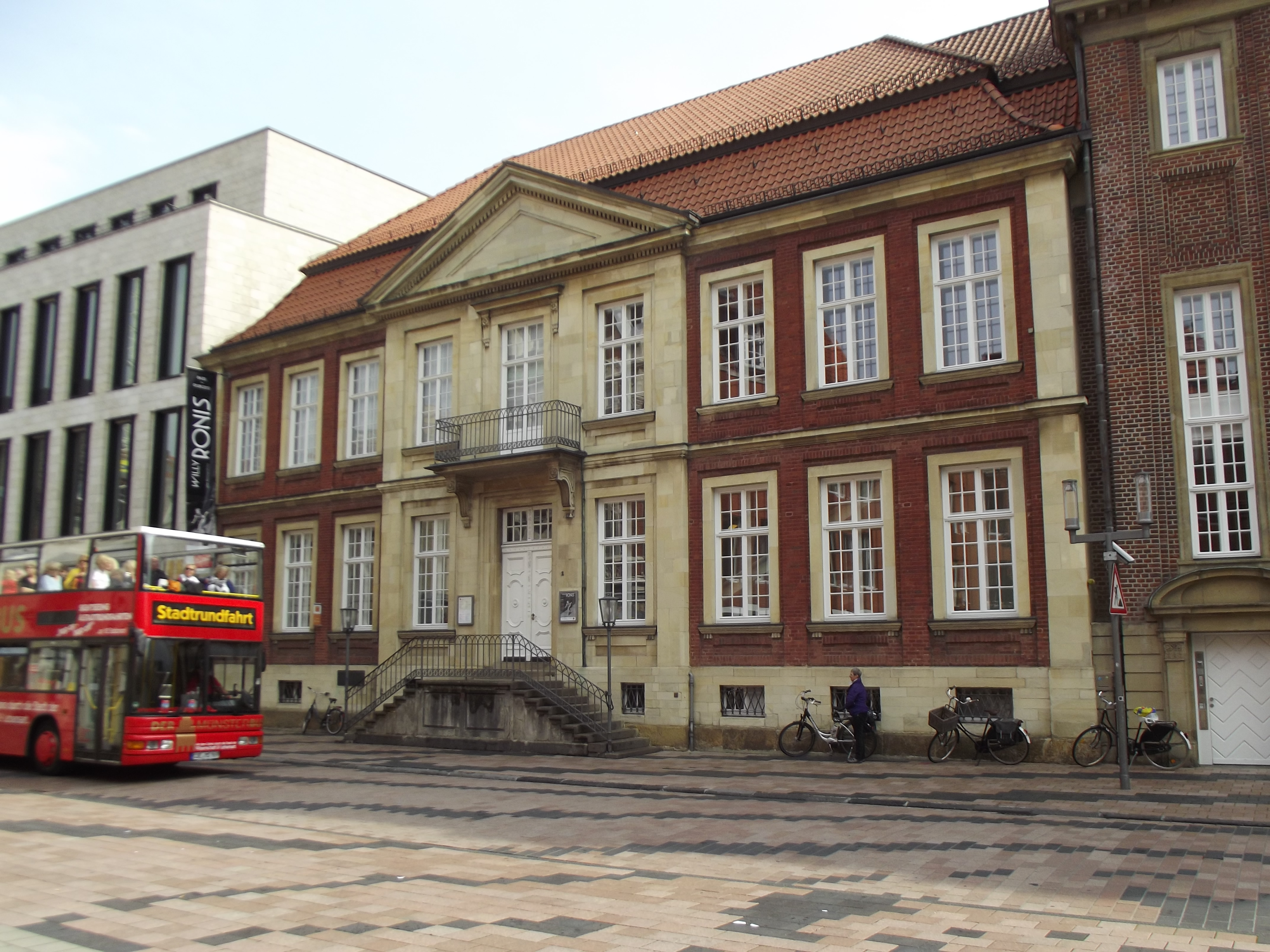
Pablo Picasso Museum Münster, popular for sightseeing tours

- Mitte:
  - Kernbereich (Centre)
- Nord:
  - Münster-Coerde|Coerde
  - Kinderhaus
  - Sprakel with Sandrup
- Ost:
  - Dyckburg, consisting of Mariendorf and Sudmühle
  - Gelmer with Gittrup
  - Handorf with Kasewinkel, Kreuzbach, Laer, Dorbaum and Verth on the left bank of the Ems and Werse
  - Mauritz-Ost and Mondstraße, combined better known as St. Mauritz
- West:
  - Albachten
  - Gievenbeck
  - Mecklenbeck
  - Nienberge with Häger, Schönebeck and Uhlenbrock
  - Roxel with Altenroxel and Oberort
  - Sentruper Höhe
- Süd-Ost:
  - Angelmodde with Hofkamp
  - Gremmendorf with Loddenheide
  - Wolbeck
- Hiltrup:
  - Amelsbüren with Sudhoff, Loevelingloh and Wilbrenning
  - Berg Fidel
  - Hiltrup

The centre can be subdivided into historically evolved city districts whose borders are not always strictly defined, such as

- Aaseestadt
- Erphoviertel
- Geistviertel
- Hansaviertel
- Herz-Jesu-Viertel
- Kreuzviertel
- Kuhviertel
- Mauritzviertel
- Neutor
- Pluggendorf
- Rumphorst
- Schlossviertel
- Südviertel
- Uppenberg
- Zentrum Nord

== Demographics ==
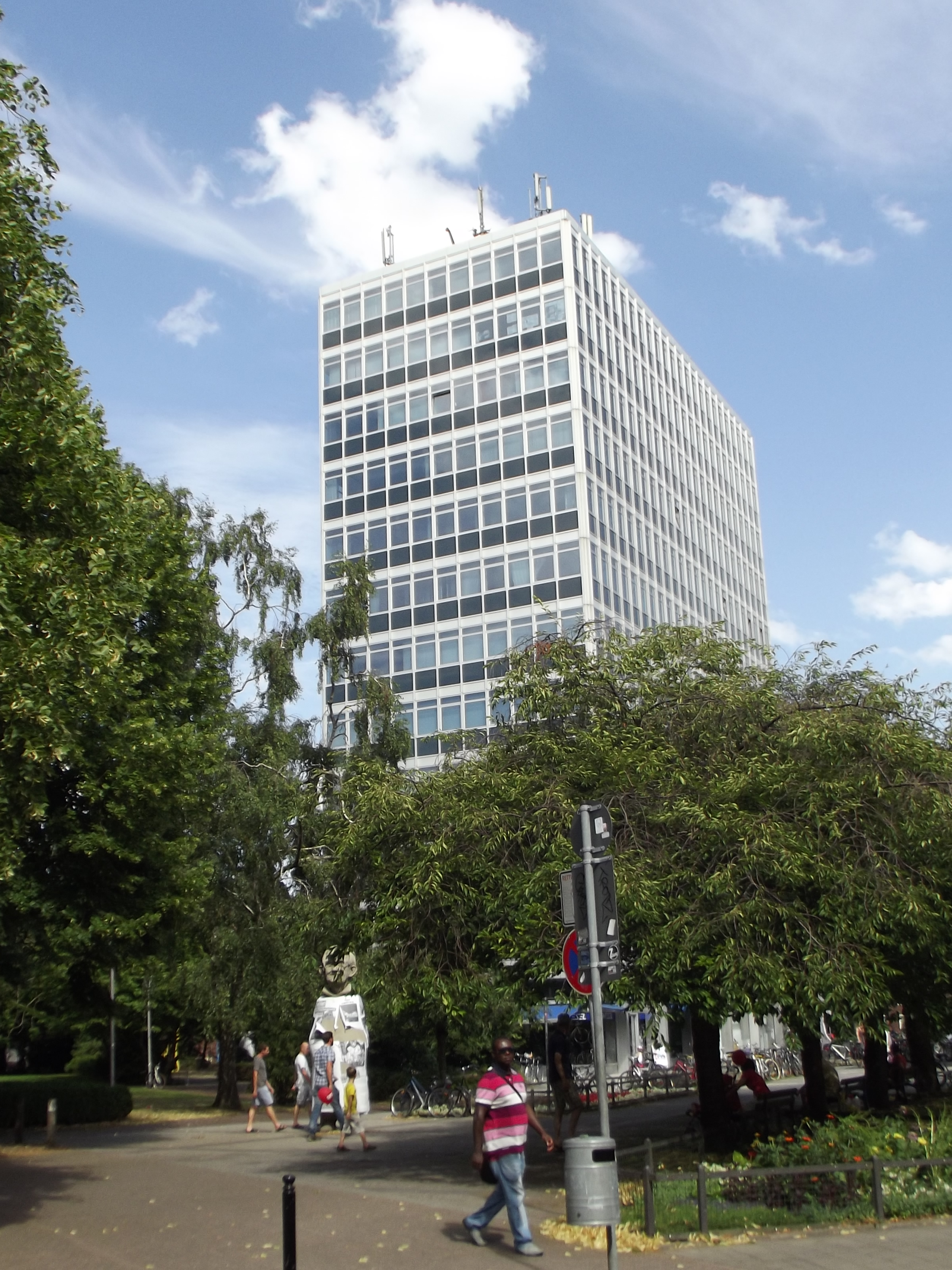
Signal-Iduna-Building, Servatiiplatz

Population development since 1816

Historical population

Year	Pop.	±% p.a.
1816	17,316	—
1831	21,893	+1.58%
1851	25,222	+0.71%
1871	24,821	−0.08%
1900	63,754	+3.31%
1910	90,254	+3.54%
1919	100,452	+1.20%
1925	106,418	+0.97%
1933	122,210	+1.74%
1939	141,059	+2.42%
1950	118,889	−1.54%
1956	155,241	+4.55%
1961	182,721	+3.31%

Year	Pop.	±% p.a.
1965	237,485	+6.77%
1970	253,614	+1.32%
1975	264,546	+0.85%
1980	269,700	+0.39%
1985	270,105	+0.03%
1990	259,438	−0.80%
1995	265,061	+0.43%
2000	265,609	+0.04%
2005	270,868	+0.39%
2010	279,803	+0.65%
2015	310,039	+2.07%
2020	316,403	+0.41%
2025	306,368	−0.64%

Population size may be affected by changes in administrative divisions.
Source: Landesdatabank Nordrhein-Westfalen (1965-2025)

Münster has a population of about 306,000 people. It is the 10th largest city in North Rhine-Westphalia and the 20th largest city in Germany. It is also the seventh largest German city by area at 303.28 km^{2} (117.10 sq mi), and serves as the center of the Münster region (known as Münsterland in German). Considered one of the oldest German cities, Münster has been a major city since approximately 1000 AD. It first reached 100,000 inhabitants in 1948, and the population has continued to grow since the 1980s due to the popularity of the local university. Münster is also known for its bicycles, and some estimates suggest it has more bicycles than people. The city reached a population of 300,000 in the 2010s.

Number of largest foreign groups in Münster by nationality:

Rank	Nationality	Population (31 December 2022)
1	Ukraine	3,478
2	Poland	2,365
3	Serbia	1,885
4	Turkey	1,735
5	Portugal	1,636
6	Italy	1,343
7	Croatia	1,105
8	Russia	987
9	Spain	865
10	United Kingdom	738

== Politics ==
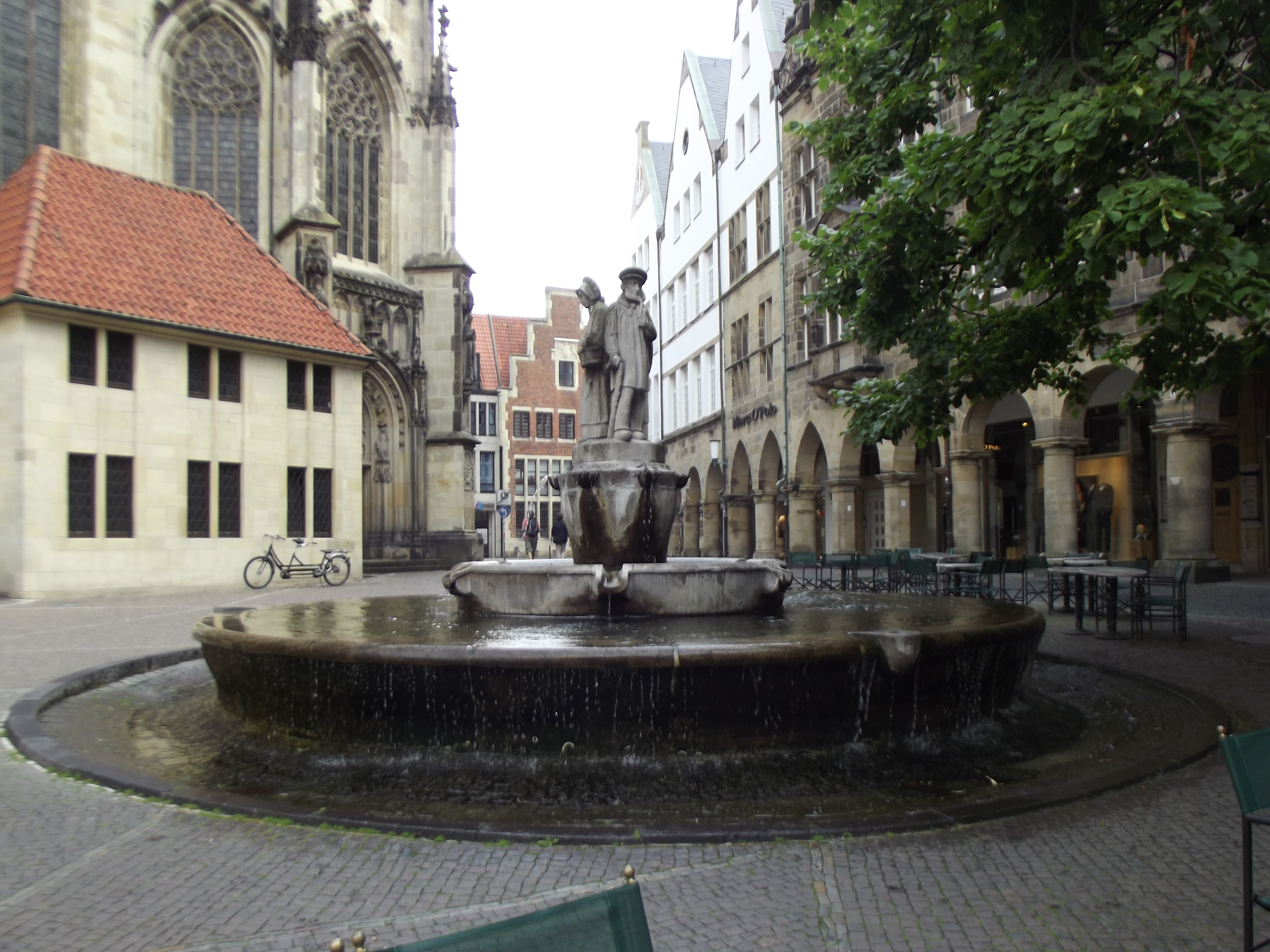
Lamberti square

=== Mayor ===
Results of the second round of the 2020 mayoral election

The current mayor of Münster is Tillmann Fuchs from the Green Party.

=== City council ===
Results of the 2020 city council election

The Münster city council governs the city alongside the mayor. The most recent city council election was held on 13 September 2020, and the results were as follows:

Party	Votes	%	±	Seats	±
Christian Democratic Union (CDU)	50,465	32.7	▼2.5	22	▼3
Alliance 90/The Greens (Grüne)	46,696	30.3	▲10.1	20	▲6
Social Democratic Party (SPD)	27,163	17.6	▼9.4	12	▼7
The Left (Die Linke)	7,539	4.9	▼0.2	3	▼1
Free Democratic Party (FDP)	7,104	4.6	▼1.3	3	▼1
Volt Germany (Volt)	4,032	2.6	New	2	New
Alternative for Germany (AfD)	3,399	2.2	▼0.4	1	▼1
Die PARTEI (PARTEI)	3,196	2.1	New	1	New
Ecological Democratic Party (ÖDP)	1,876	1.2	▲0.1	1	±0
Munster List (Münsterliste)	1,848	1.2	New	1	New
Pirate Party Germany (Piraten)	959	0.6	▼1.5	0	▼2
Modern Social Party (MSP)	71	0.0	New	0	New
Valid votes	154,348	99.2			
Invalid votes	1,273	0.8			
Total	155,621	100.0		66	▼6
Electorate/voter turnout	247,189	63.0	▲3.3		
Source: State Returning Officer

=== Representation ===
Münster forms its own Electoral district (No. 129) for elections on a national level. Due to Germany's mixture of a direct and a proportional electoral system Münster sends a directly elected member into the Bundestag as well as other politicians have the chance to qualify via their party's state-wide list. As for the 2021 German federal election health politician Maria Klein-Schmeink (The Greens) won the districts seat in the Bundestag with 32.3% of the personal vote. Defeated candidates, former member of the Landtag of North Rhine-Westphalia Stefan Nacke (CDU/26.2%) and former environment minister Svenja Schulze (SPD/24.1%) both became members of the 20th Bundestag via their parties' lists. Svenja Schulze entered the new Scholz cabinet regaining a position as minister, this time in the Federal Ministry for Economic Cooperation and Development.

On the state level Münster was divided into two constituencies up until the 2017 North Rhine-Westphalia state election. The election system of state elections mirrors that of national elections. During the legislative period of Laschet cabinet redistricting resulted in Münster now being split up into three constituencies, two of which now also include some surrounding municipalities. The 2017 election saw both CDU candidates Stefan Nacke and Simone Wendland winning their seat via the constituency. Via party lists Svenja Schulze (SPD) and Josefine Paul (The Greens) entered the Landtag. After Nacke and Schulze both changed into federal politics, Münster is left with only two representatives in the Landtag.

== Economy ==
Greater Münster is home to many industries such as those of public authorities, consulting companies, insurance companies, banks, computer centres, publishing houses, advertising and design. The service sector has created several thousand jobs. Retailers have approximately 1.9 billion euro turnover. The city still has traditional merchants' townhouses as well as modern outlets.

== Entrepreneurship ==
Münster's wealth was underpinned by wealthy merchant families such as the Merfelders, Rüschkamps, and Berens. Berens Bank was founded in 1630 in Münster, Germany, by Hermann Berens. Berens was a successful merchant and banker, and he founded the bank to provide financial services to other businesses and individuals in the city. The Berens family lived in a large house on Roggenmarkt, known as the Berenshof. The Berens interests included textiles and grain.

The job market situation in Münster is "comparatively good". Of the approximately 130,000 employees subject to social insurance contribution more than 80% work in the tertiary sector, about 17% work in the secondary sector and 1% work in the primary sector.

== Main sights ==
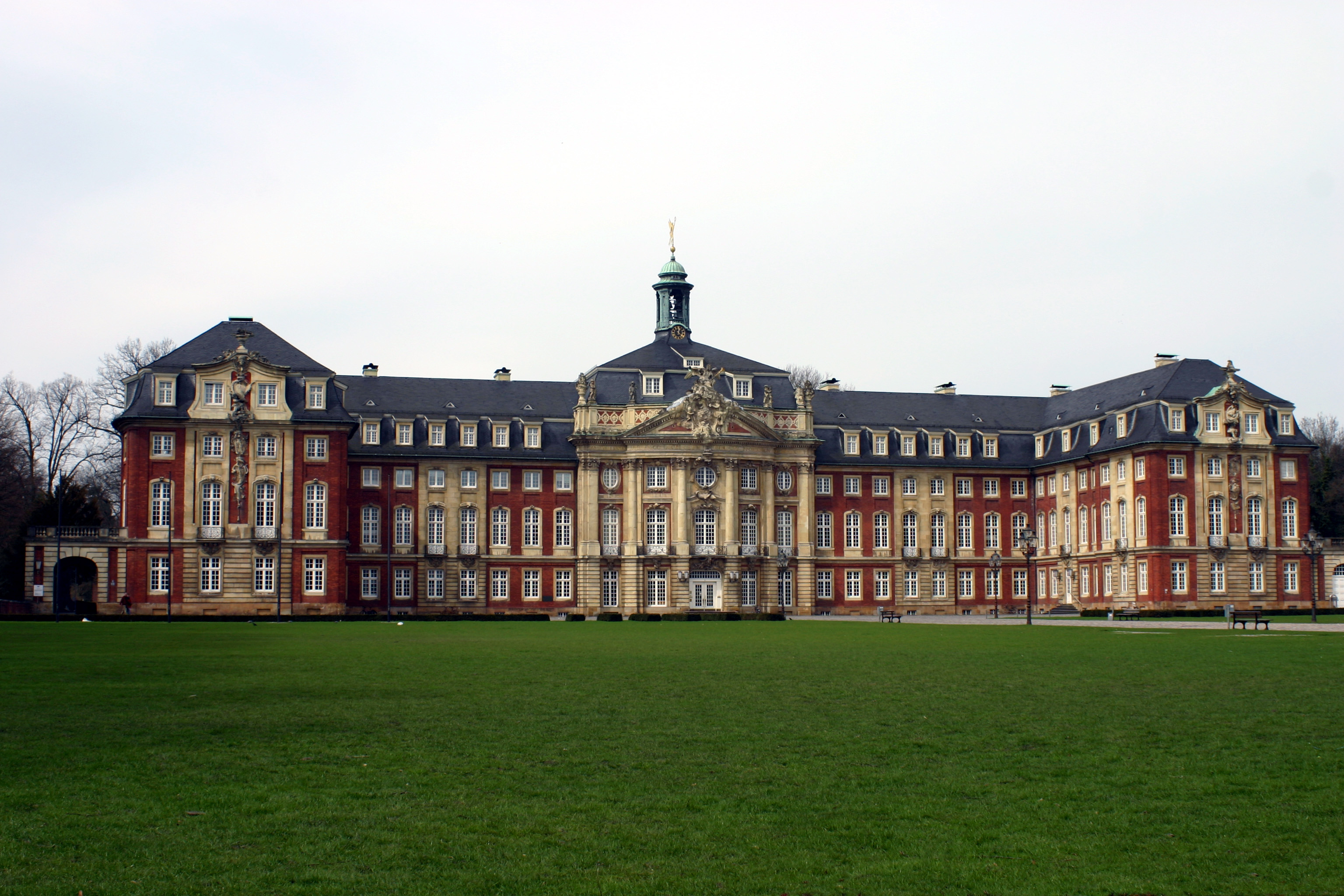
Main administration building of University of Münster

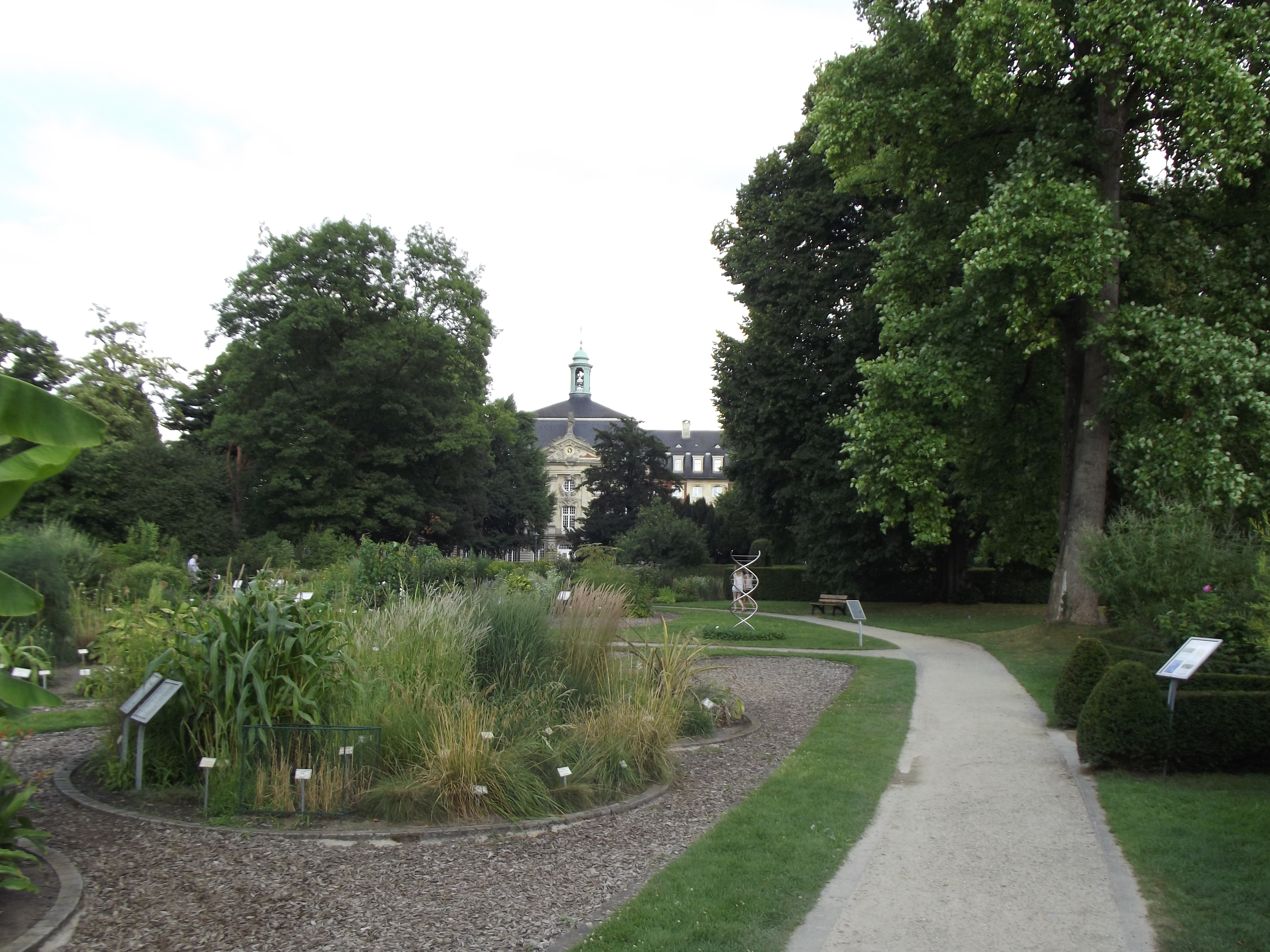
Botanic Garden

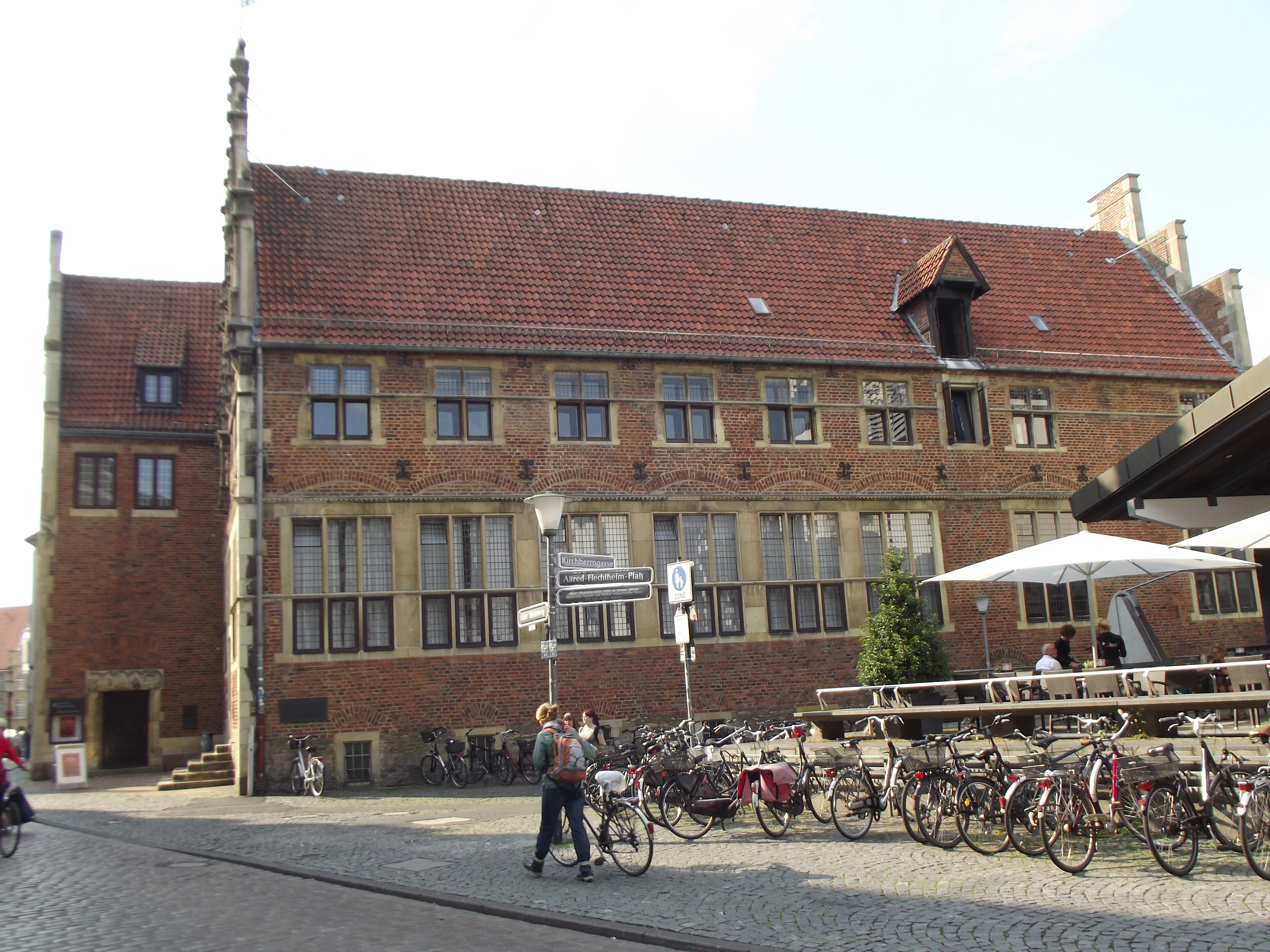
Krameramtshaus

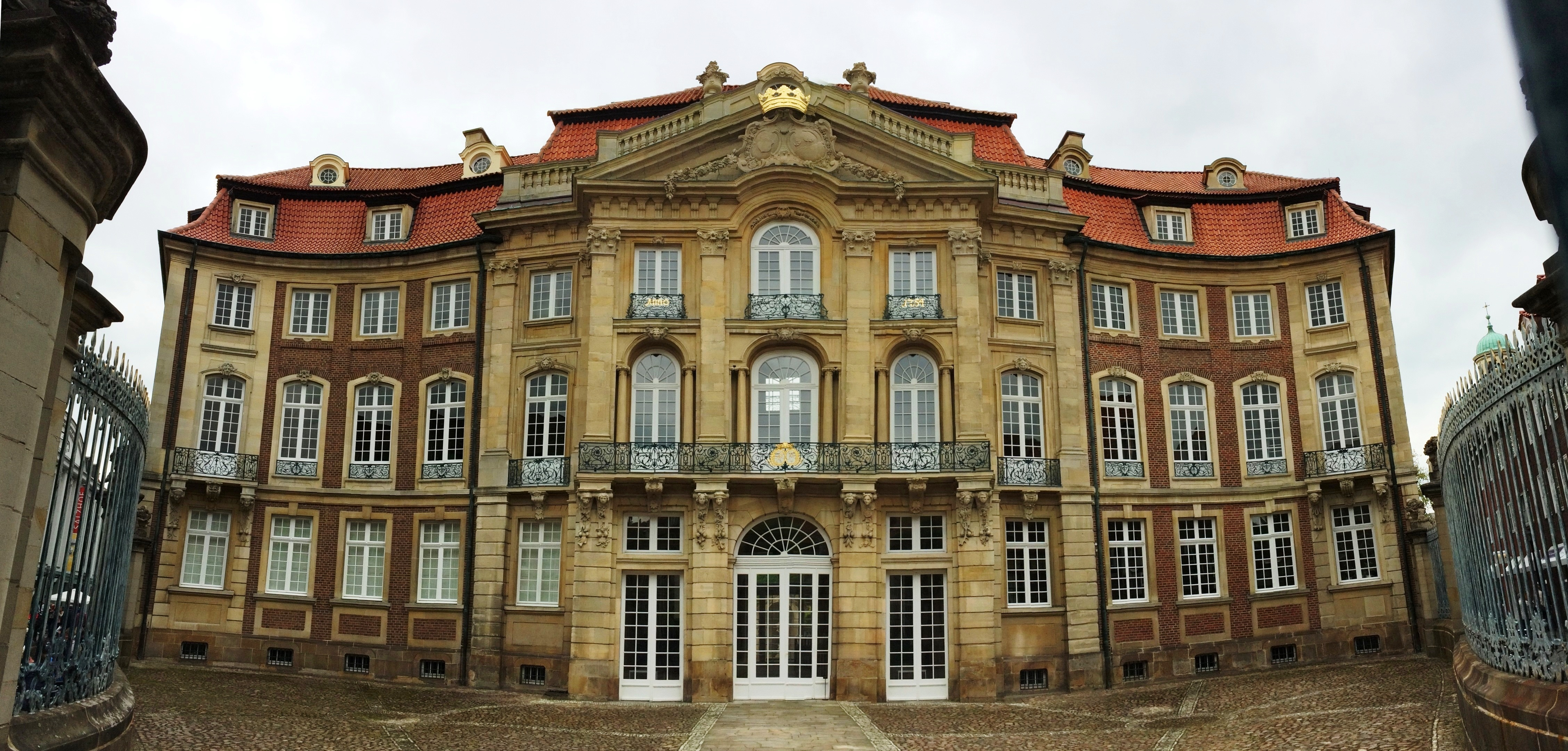
Erbdrostenhof Palace, birthplace of Blessed Mary of the Divine Heart

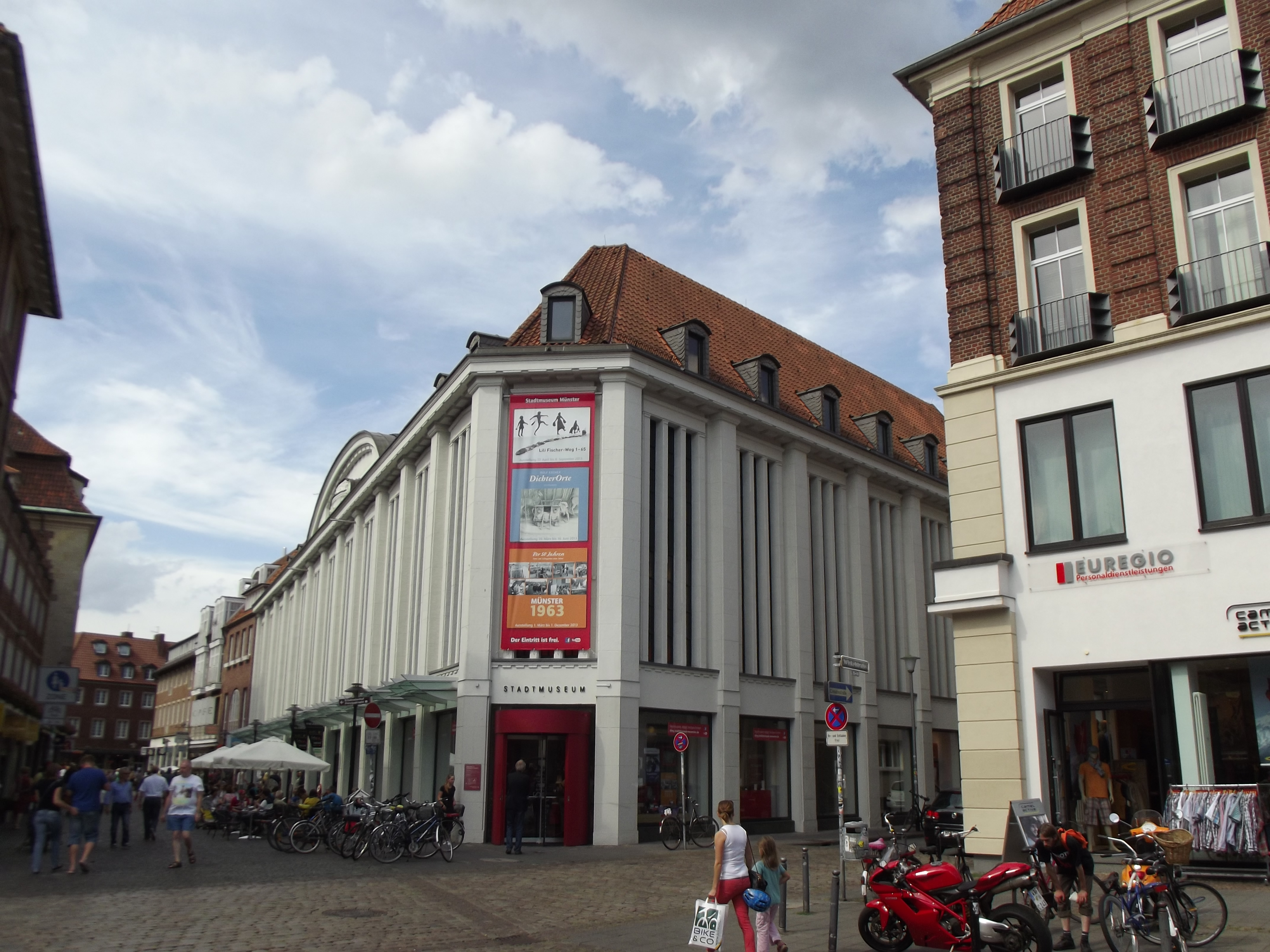
City Museum Münster

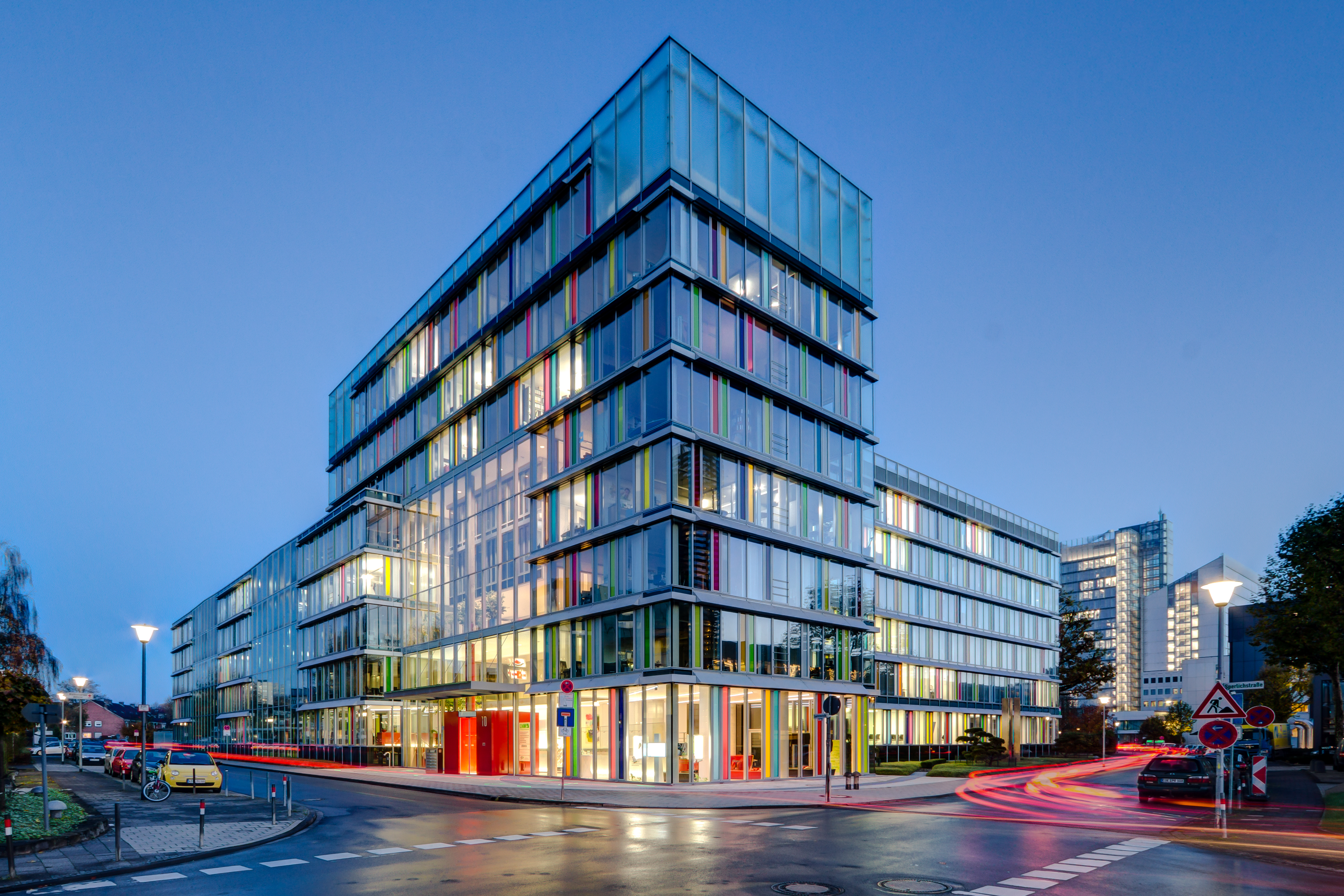
Headquarters LVM Insurance ("Villa Kunterbunt")

- St. Paul's Cathedral, built in the 13th century in a mixture of late Romanesque and early Gothic styles. It was completely restored after World War II. It includes an astronomical clock of 1540, adorned with hand-painted zodiac symbols, which traces the movement of the planets, and plays a Glockenspiel tune every noon.
- The Prinzipalmarkt, the main shopping street in the city centre with the Gothic city hall (14th century) in which the Peace of Westphalia treaty which put an end to the Thirty Years' War was signed in 1648. Immediately north of the Prinzipalmarkt is the Roggenmarkt.
- St Lambert's Church (1375), with three cages hanging from its tower above the clock face. In 1535 these cages were used to display the corpses of Jan van Leiden and other leaders of the Münster Rebellion, who promoted polygamy and renunciation of all property.
- Überwasserkirche, a Gothic hall church consecrated in 1340 as church of a Stift which grew to be the University of Münster
- The Schloss (palace), built in 1767–87 as residence for the prince-bishops by the Baroque architect Johann Conrad Schlaun and Wilhelm Ferdinand Lipper. Now the administrative centre for the university.
- The Botanischer Garten Münster, a botanical garden founded in 1803
- The Zwinger fortress built in 1528. Used from the 18th to the 20th century as a prison. During World War II, the Gestapo also used the Zwinger for executions
- "Krameramtshaus" (1589), an old guild house, which housed the delegation from the Netherlands during the signing of the Peace of Westphalia
- Stadthaus (1773)
- Haus Rüschhaus (1743–49), a country estate situated in Nienberge, built by Johann Conrad Schlaun for himself
- Erbdrostenhof (1749–53), a Baroque palace, also built by Schlaun, residence of Droste zu Vischering noble family and birthplace of Blessed Mary of the Divine Heart.
- Clemenskirche (1745–53), a Baroque church, also built by Schlaun
- Kreuzkirche, a Gothic-revival church
- Signal-Iduna Building (1961), the first high-rise building in Münster
- LVM-Building, high-rise building near the Aasee
- LBS-Building, location of Münster's first zoo. Some old structures of the former zoo can be found in the park around the office building. Also the "Tuckesburg", the strange-looking house of the zoo's founder, is still intact.
- "Münster Arkaden" (2006), new shopping centre between Prinzipalmarkt and the Pablo Picasso Museum of Graphic Art
- "Cavete", the oldest academic pub in Münster
- Westphalian State Museum of Art and Cultural History
- University Bible museum
- Buddenturm – a former city water tower built about 1150 as a defence tower and now fitted with windows, is near the largest aggregation of pubs in the city
- City Museum ("Stadtmuseum"), exhibition of a large collection showing the political and cultural history of the city from its beginning up to present, housed in a converted former department store
- University Mineralogical Museum
- Westphalian Horse Museum ("Hippomax")
- Mühlenhof open-air museum, depicting a typical Westphalian village as it looked centuries ago
- Westphalian Museum for Natural History, state museum and planetarium
- Museum of Lacquer Art (founded and operated by the company BASF Coatings)
- Pablo Picasso Museum of Graphic Art, the only museum devoted exclusively to the graphic works of Pablo Picasso
- Pinkus Müller, the only brewery left in Münster; originally there were more than 150.
- Kiepenkerl Statue in Kiepenkerl Square

== Education ==
Münster is home to many institutions of higher education, including the University of Münster and University of Applied Sciences. The city also has 92 primary and secondary education schools. The city had 61,441 students in 2015/16. There are couple of public and private vocational colleges in the city of Münster.

Public vocational colleges

- Adolph-Kolping-Berufskolleg
- Anne Frank Vocational College
- Hans-Böckler-Berufskolleg
- Hansa-Berufskolleg
- Ludwig-Erhard-Berufskolleg
- Wilhelm-Emmanuel-von-Ketteler-Berufskolleg

Private vocational colleges

- Technical School for Agricultural Economics, Münster
- Cooperative Vocational College (GenoKolleg)
- Hildegardisschule, vocational college in the diocese of Münster
- Timmermeister-Berufskolleg

== Transport ==
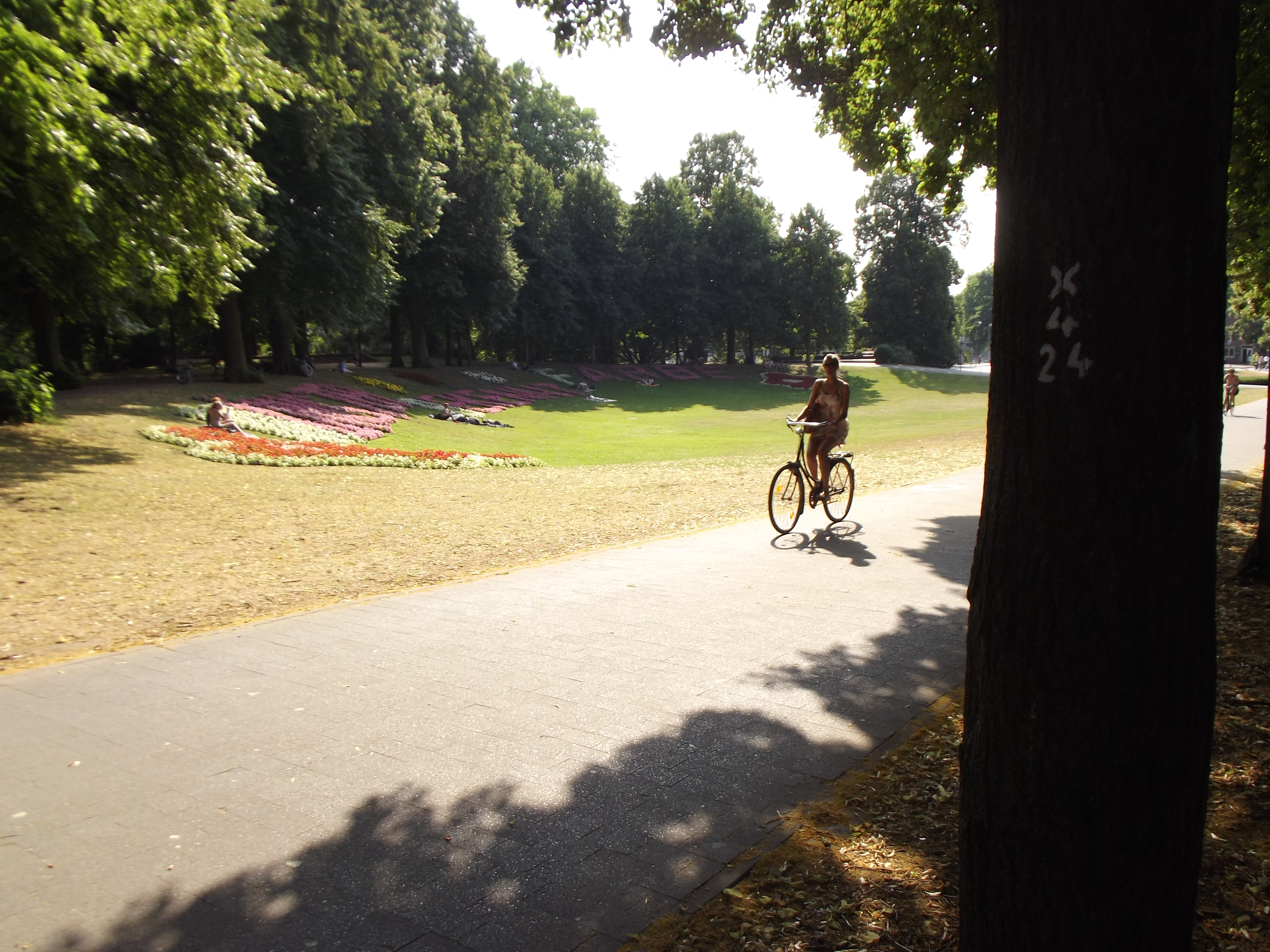
"Promenade" in the summer

=== Air ===
Münster Osnabrück Airport serves the city of Münster. The airport provides flights to European destinations mostly.

=== Bicycling ===
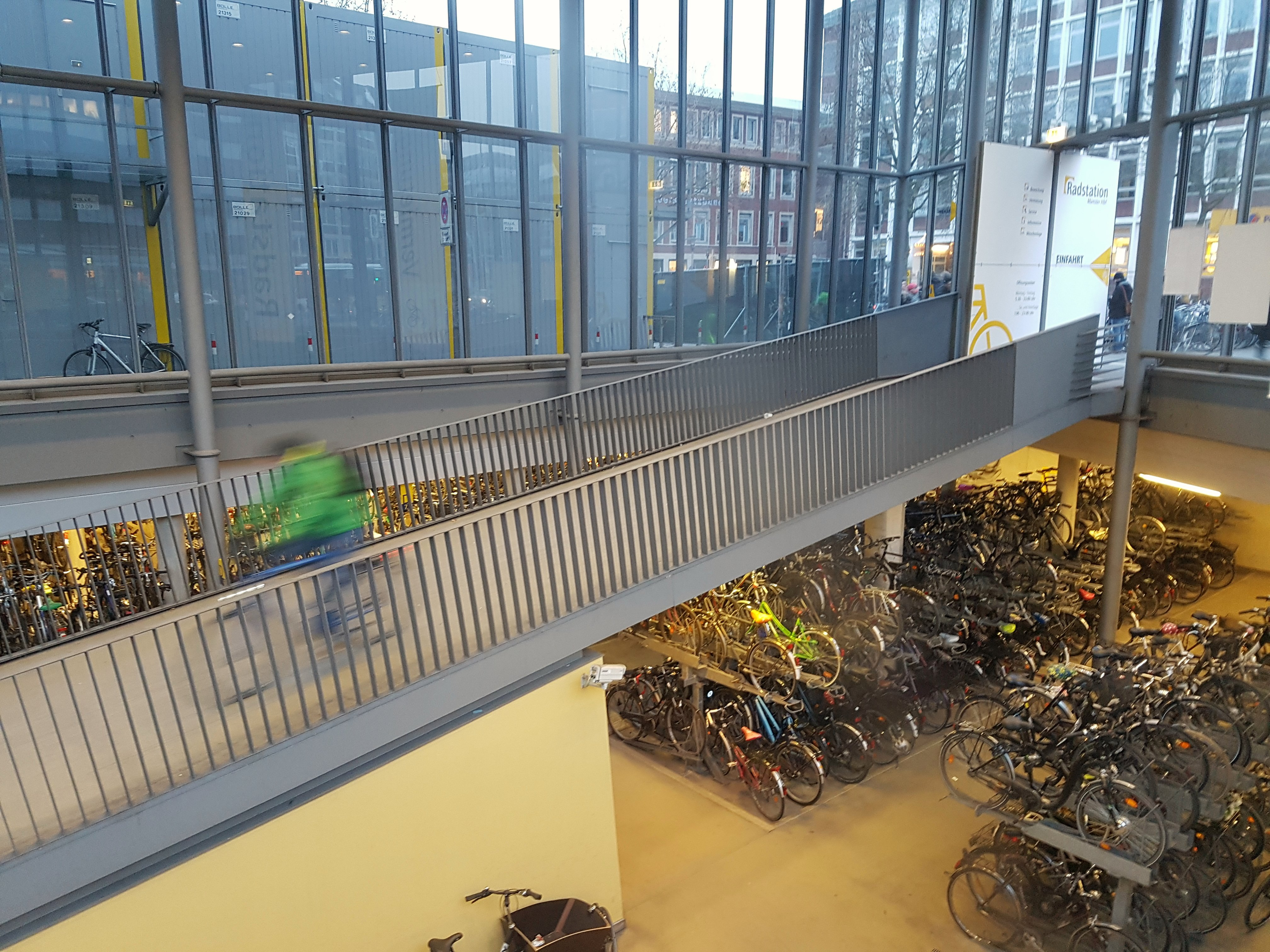
Radstation (bicycle station) at the central train station, parking, repair, rent and cleaning services

Münster claims to be the bicycle capital of Germany. It states that in 2007, vehicle traffic (36.4%) fell below traffic by bicycle (37.6%). The city maintains an extensive network for bicycles including the popular "Promenade" which encircles Münster's city centre. While motorised vehicles are banned, there are paths for pedestrians. Additional bicycle paths link all city districts with the inner city and special traffic lights provide signals for bicyclists. Bicycle stations in Münster offer bicycle rentals.

=== Train ===
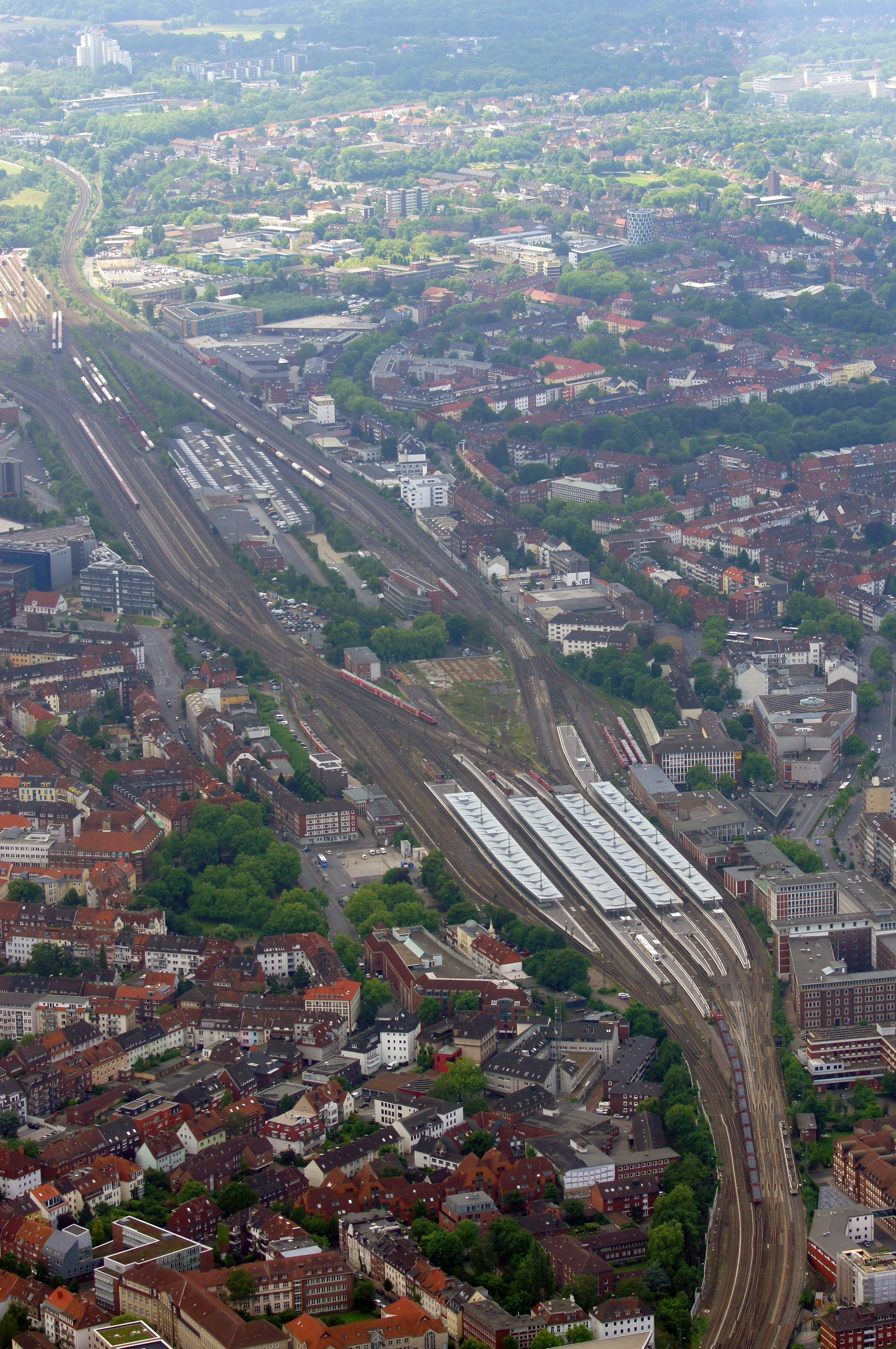
Muenster (Westf) Hbf

Münster's Central Station is on the Wanne-Eickel–Hamburg railway. The city is connected by Intercity trains to many other major cities in Germany.

Munster is connected to several long distance and local train lines.

The Muenster-Sendenhorst line should be reactivated for the public local train transport (SPNV) from August 2026 and some new stops constructed, also a new stops within the city of Muenster will be constructed, the Halle Munensterland stop.

=== City busses ===
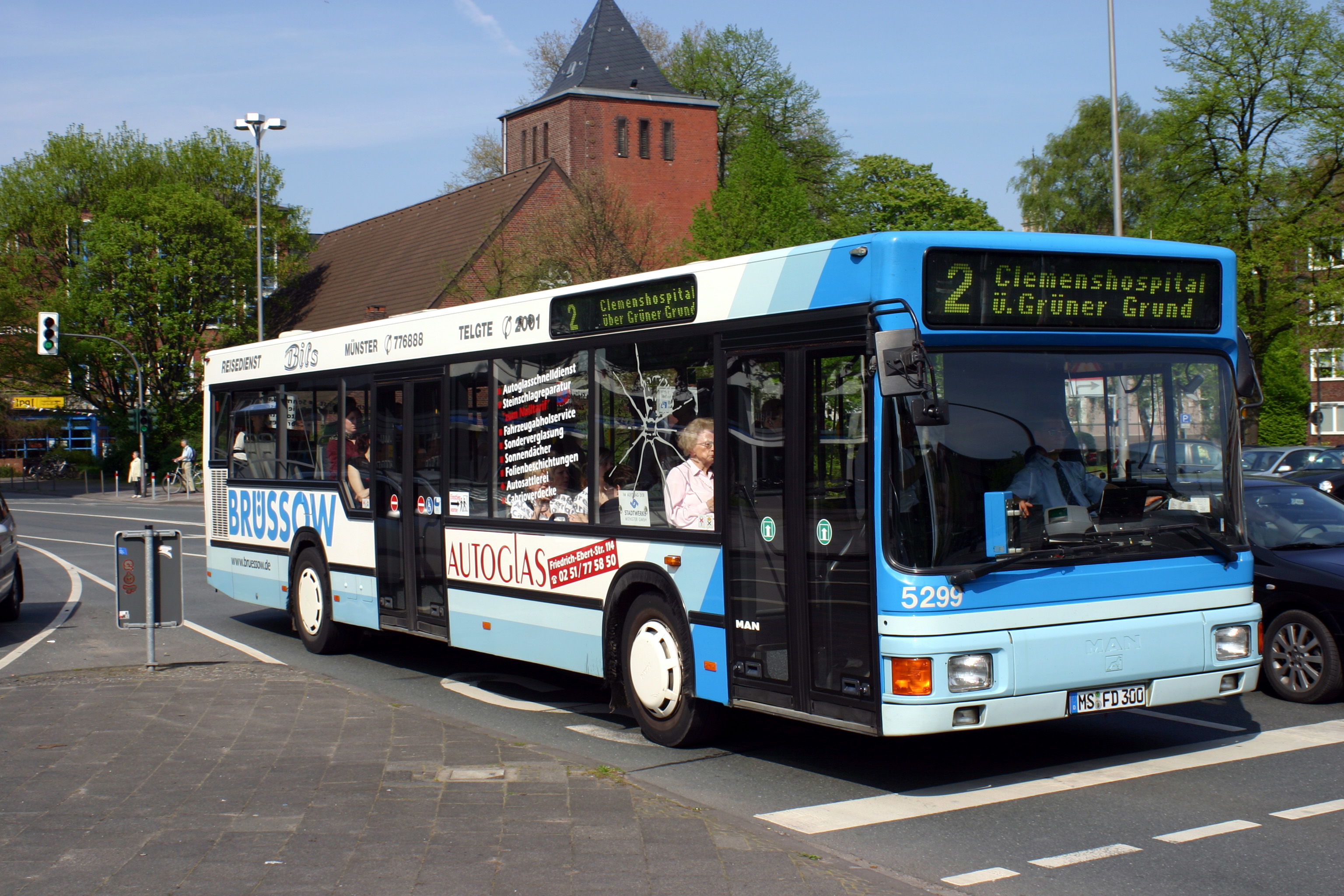
City bus in Muenster

Historically, Münster had a historic tramway system, but it closed in 1954. Today, Münster does have some public transportation, which includes bus expresses, sightseeing buses, "waterbuses", Lime scooters and bicycle rentals. It is the largest German city without any form of urban rail system.

=== Fare association ===
Münster is located in the area of the fare association Westfalen-Tarif, in the fare zone 55000.

== Sports ==
The city is home to Preußen Münster, which was founded on 30 April 1906. The main section is football, and the team plays at Preußenstadion. Other important sports teams include the USC Münster e.V. volleyball club.

Uni Baskets Münster is the city's professional basketball team. Home games are at Sporthalle Berg Fidel.

== British forces ==
After the Second World War, Münster became a major station within Osnabrück Garrison, part of British Forces Germany. Their presence was gradually reduced, yet there are still many active military bases. The last forces left Münster on 4 July 2013.

== Twin towns – sister cities ==
Münster is twinned with:

- York, England, United Kingdom (1958)
- Orléans, France (1960)
- Kristiansand, Norway (1967)
- Monastir, Tunisia (1969)
- Rishon LeZion, Israel (1981)
- Fresno, United States (1986)
- Ryazan, Russia (1989)
- Mühlhausen, Germany (1990)
- Lublin, Poland (1991)
- Enschede, Netherlands (2020)

== Notable people ==
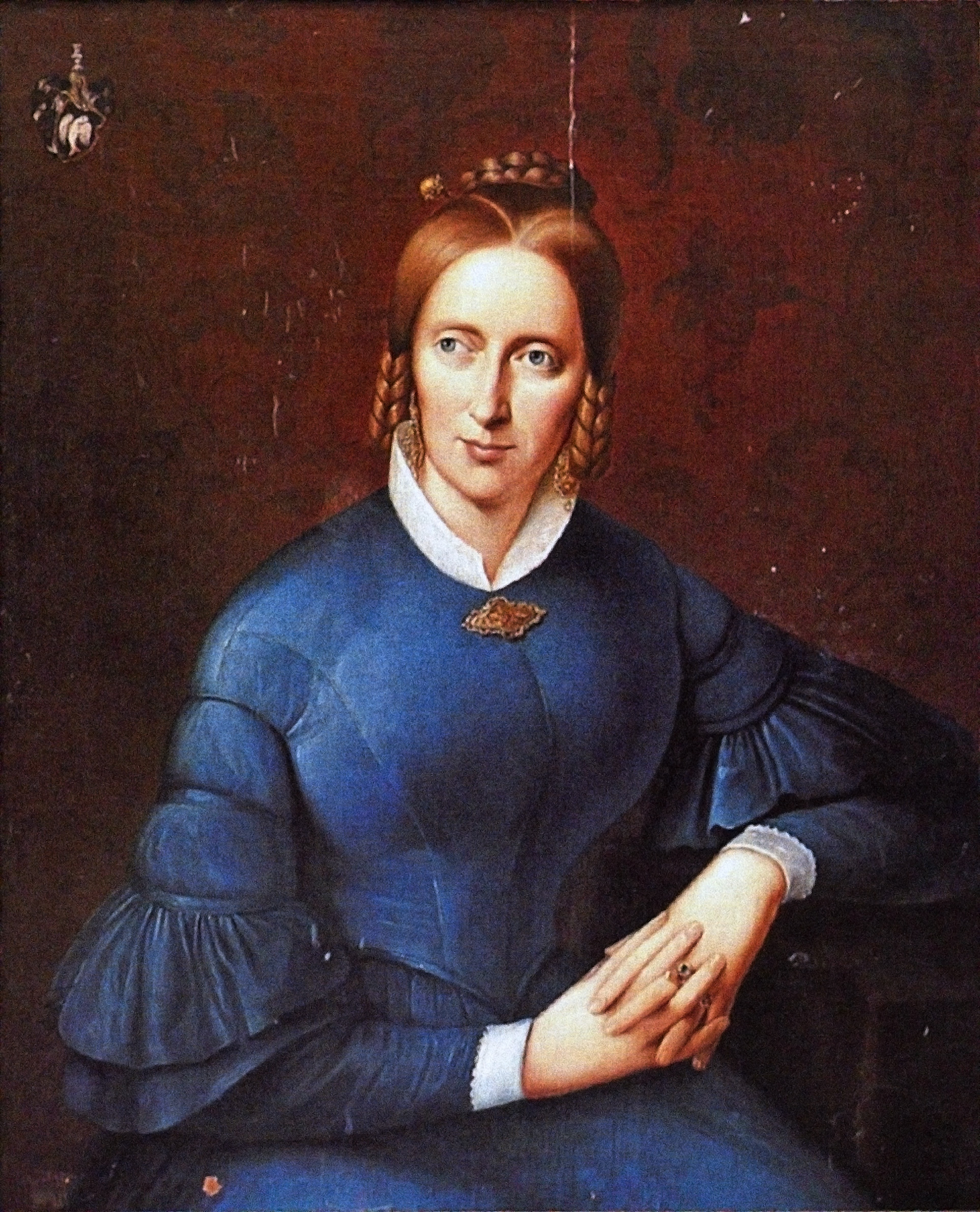
Annette von Droste-Hülshoff, 1838

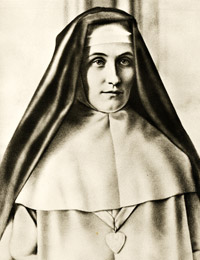
Maria Droste zu Vischering

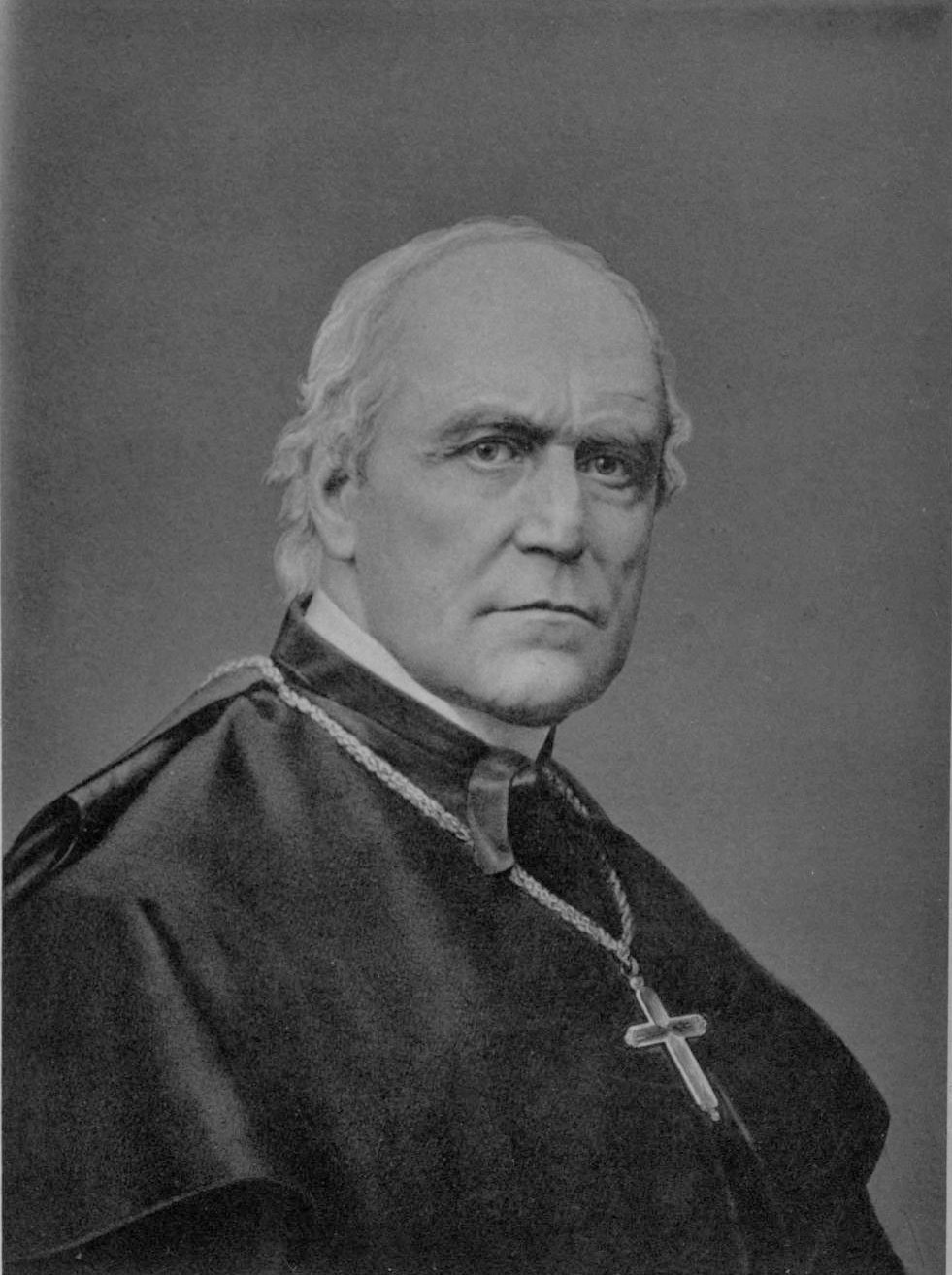
Wilhelm Emmanuel von Ketteler, bishop of Mainz

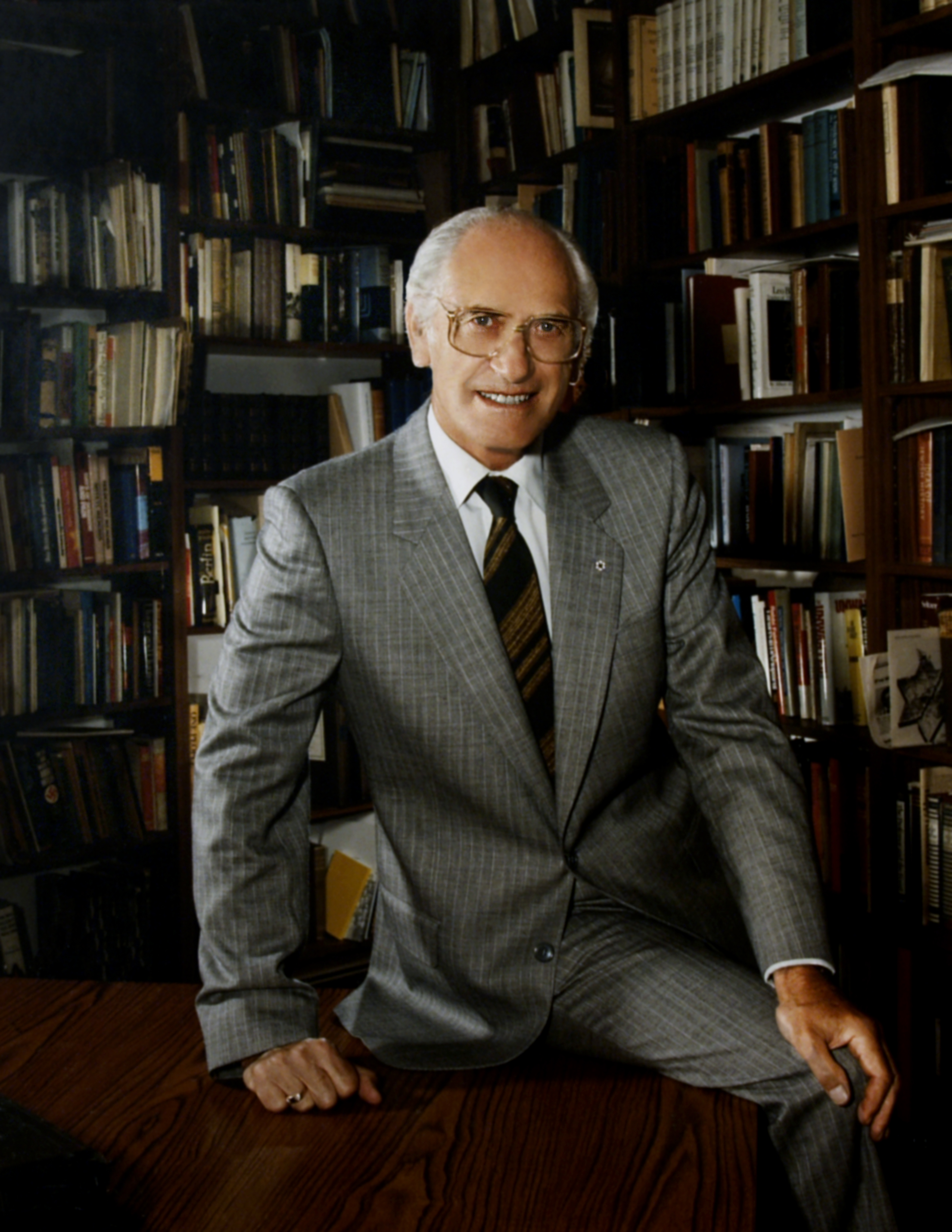
Gunther Plaut

- Johannes Veghe (c. 1435–1504), religious writer
- Henry Nicholis (ca.1501 – ca.1580), a German mystic, founded Familia Caritatis.
- Christoph Bernhard Verspoell (1743–1818), priest and publisher of an influential hymnal
- Clemens August Droste zu Vischering (1773–1845), Archbishop of Cologne.
- Georges Depping (1784–1853), German-French historian
- Annette von Droste-Hülshoff (1797–1848), noble and poet.
- Wilhelm Emmanuel von Ketteler (1811–1877), theologian and politician, Bishop of Mainz.
- Paul Melchers (1813–1895), Cardinal and Archbishop of Cologne
- Joseph Weydemeyer (1818–1866), military officer, journalist, politician and Marxist revolutionary
- Ludwig von Wittich (1818–1884), Prussian lieutenant general
- Max von Forckenbeck (1821–1892), National Liberal politician, mayor of Wroclaw and Berlin
- Bernard Altum (1824–1900), zoologist, ornithologist and forest scientist
- Elisabet Ney (1833–1907), sculptor
- Alexander von Kluck (1846–1934), German general, World War I
- Albert Kopfermann (1846–1914), musicologist and librarian
- Mary of the Divine Heart Droste zu Vischering (1863–1899), noble and nun beatified by Pope Paul VI
- Carl Schuhmann (1869–1946), gymnast and wrestler
- Alfred Flechtheim (1878–1937), art dealer, art collector, journalist, and publisher
- Clemens August Graf von Galen (1878–1946), cardinal, Bishop of Münster, beatified by Pope Benedict XVI
- Friedrich-Carl Rabe von Pappenheim (1894–1977), general in the Wehrmacht of Nazi Germany and war criminal
- Kurt Gerstein (1905–1945), SS officer
- Gunther Plaut (1912–2012), Reform rabbi and author
- Moondog (1916–1999), musician, composer, theoretician, poet, and inventor of musical instruments
- Alfred Dregger (1920–2002), politician and leader of the CDU
- Peter Duesberg (1936–2026), virologist who discovered the first retrovirus
- Dieter Sieger (born 1938), shipbuilder
- Heinz Lukas-Kindermann (born 1939), opera director
- Detlev Jöcker (born 1951), composer, singer and songwriter
- Götz Alsmann (born 1957), television presenter, musician, and singer
- Ludger Kühnhardt (born 1958) journalist and political scientist and advisor
- Andreas Dombret (born 1960), board member of German central bank Deutsche Bundesbank
- Monika Grütters (born 1962), politician
- Ute Lemper (born 1963), cabaret singer and actress
- Stefan Dohr (born 1965), French horn player, current principal horn of the Berlin Philharmonic
- Günther Jauch (born 13 July 1965) entertainer, journalist, and TV presenter
- Tanita Tikaram (born 1969), British singer-songwriter
- Berthold Warnecke (born 1971), dramaturge and opera director
- Franka Potente (born 1974), German actress
- Guido Maria Kretschmer (Born 11 May 1975), designer and TV presenter
- Linus Gerdemann (born 1982), cyclist
- Jens Höing (born 1987), racing driver
- Esther Dierkes (born 1990), opera singer

== Gallery ==
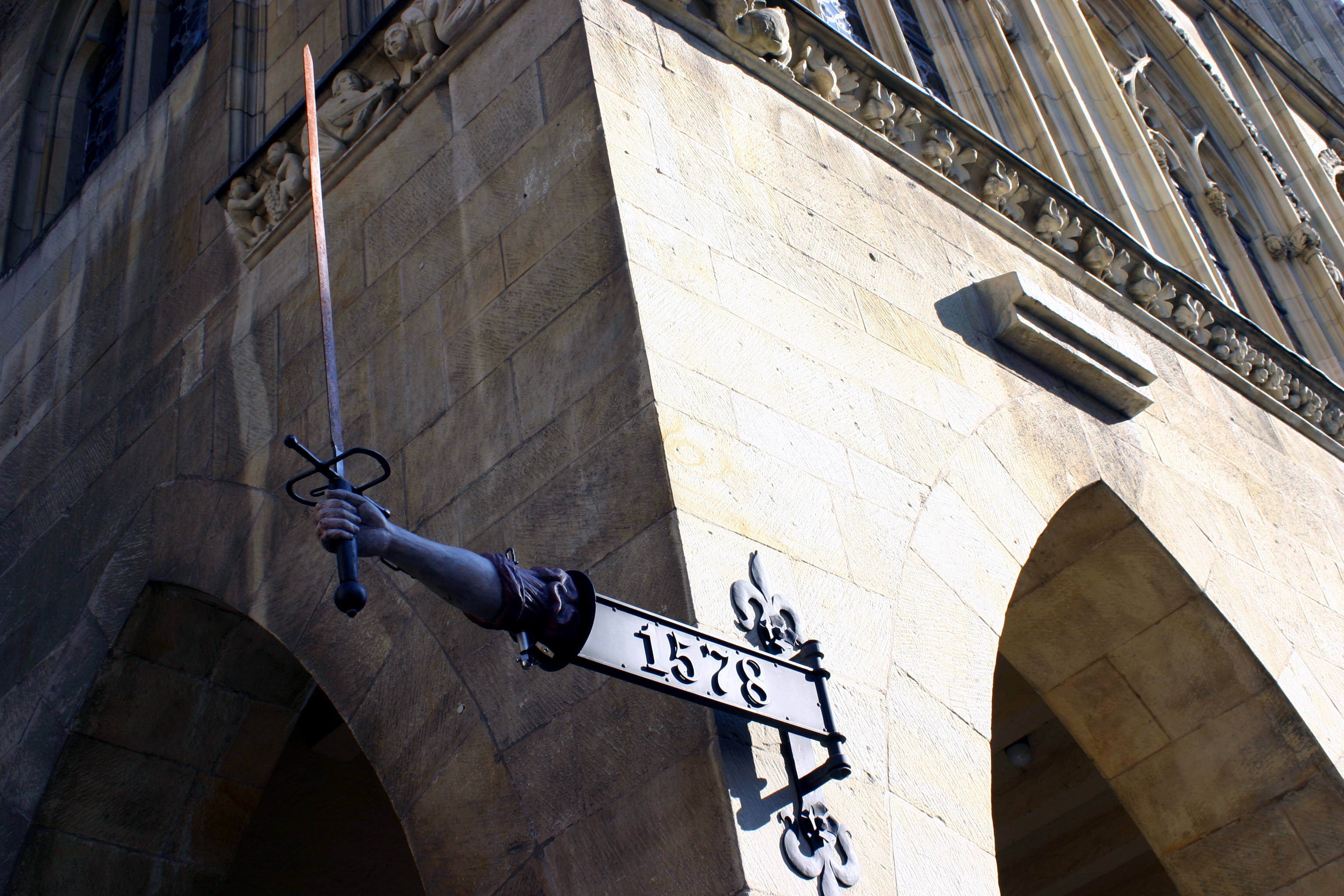
Symbolic sword, old city hall

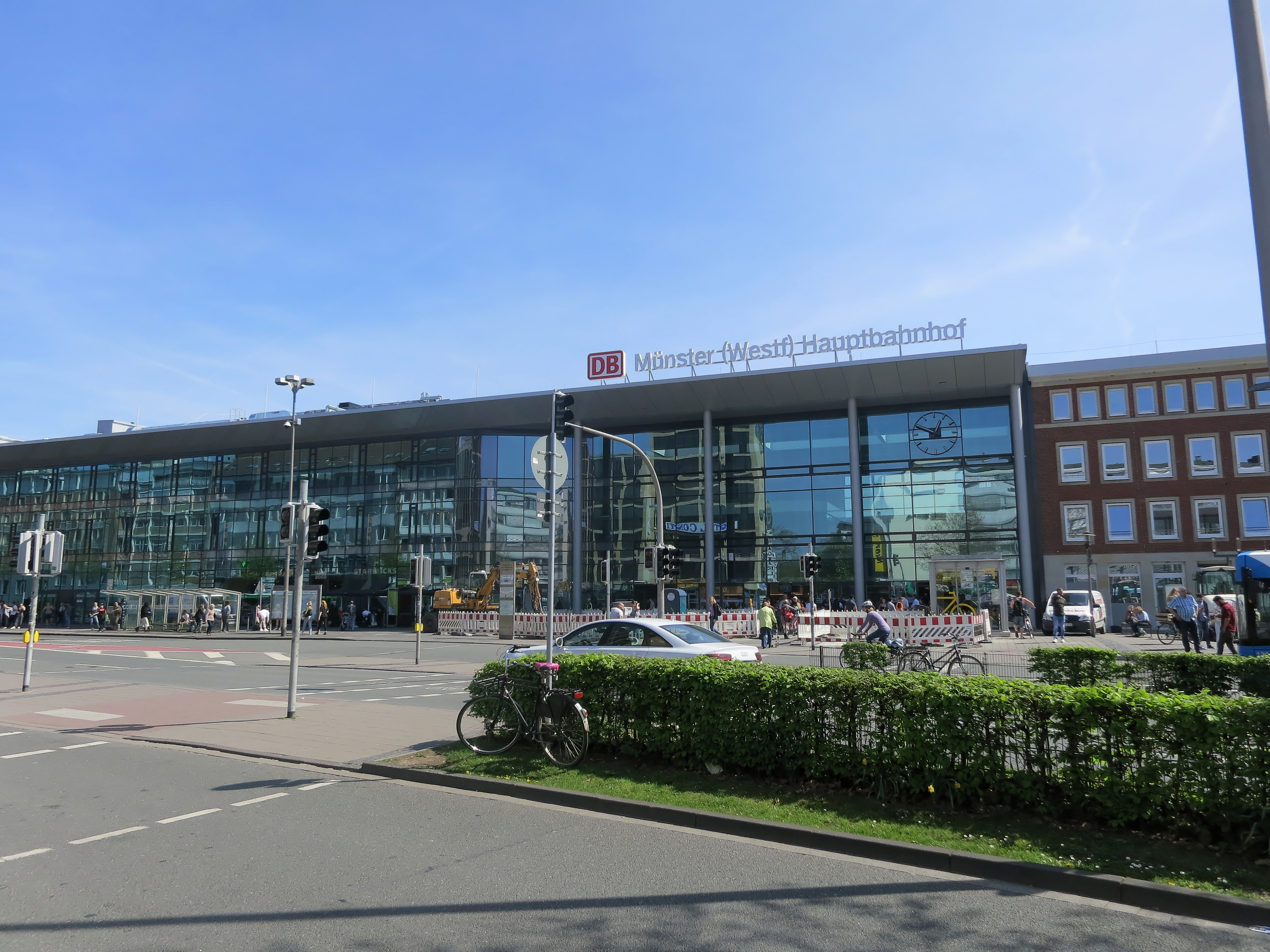
Hauptbahnhof, Centre

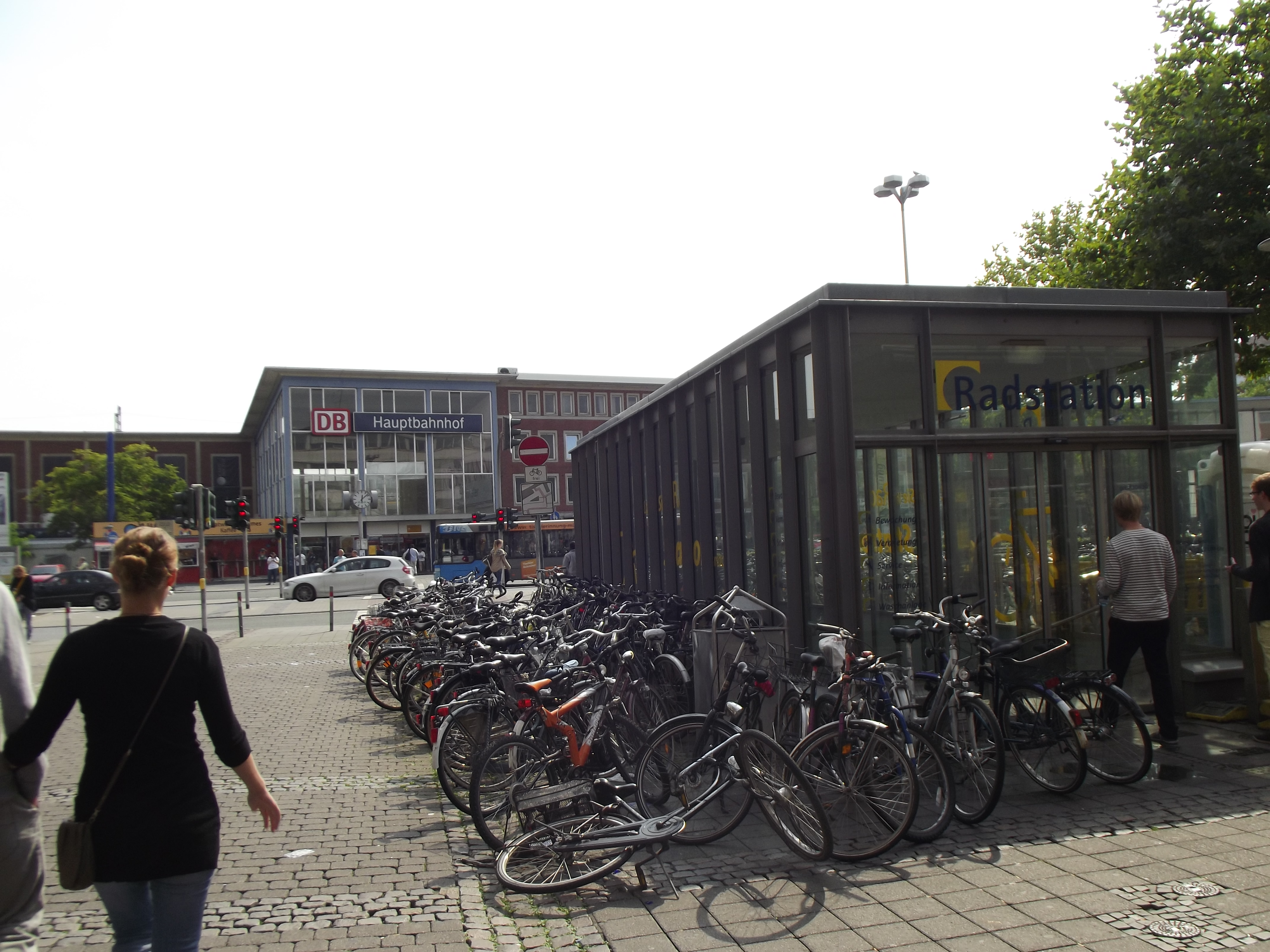
Entrance bicycle station opposite the old railway station

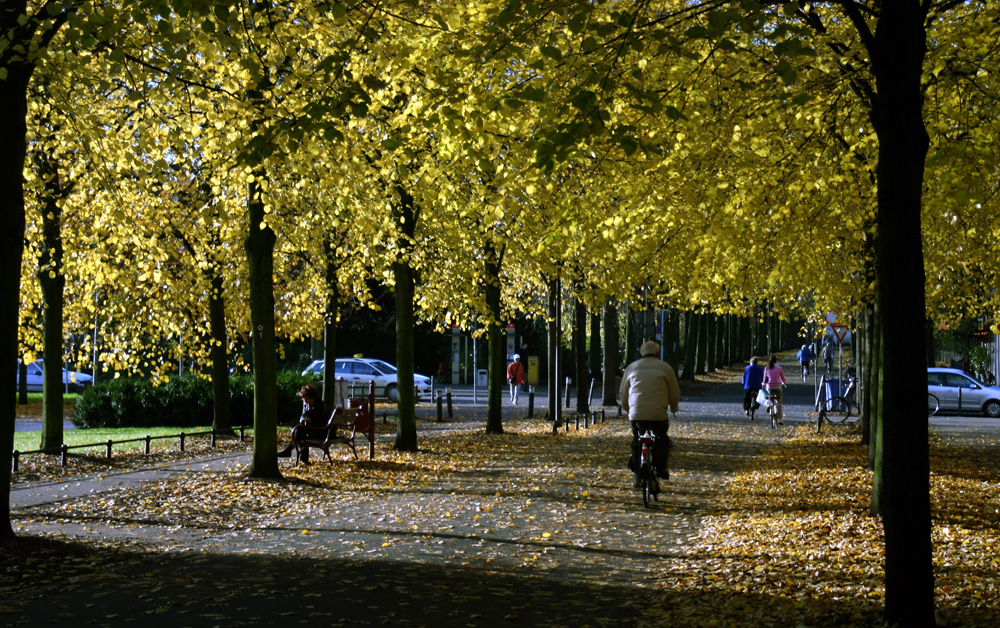
Promenade in autumn

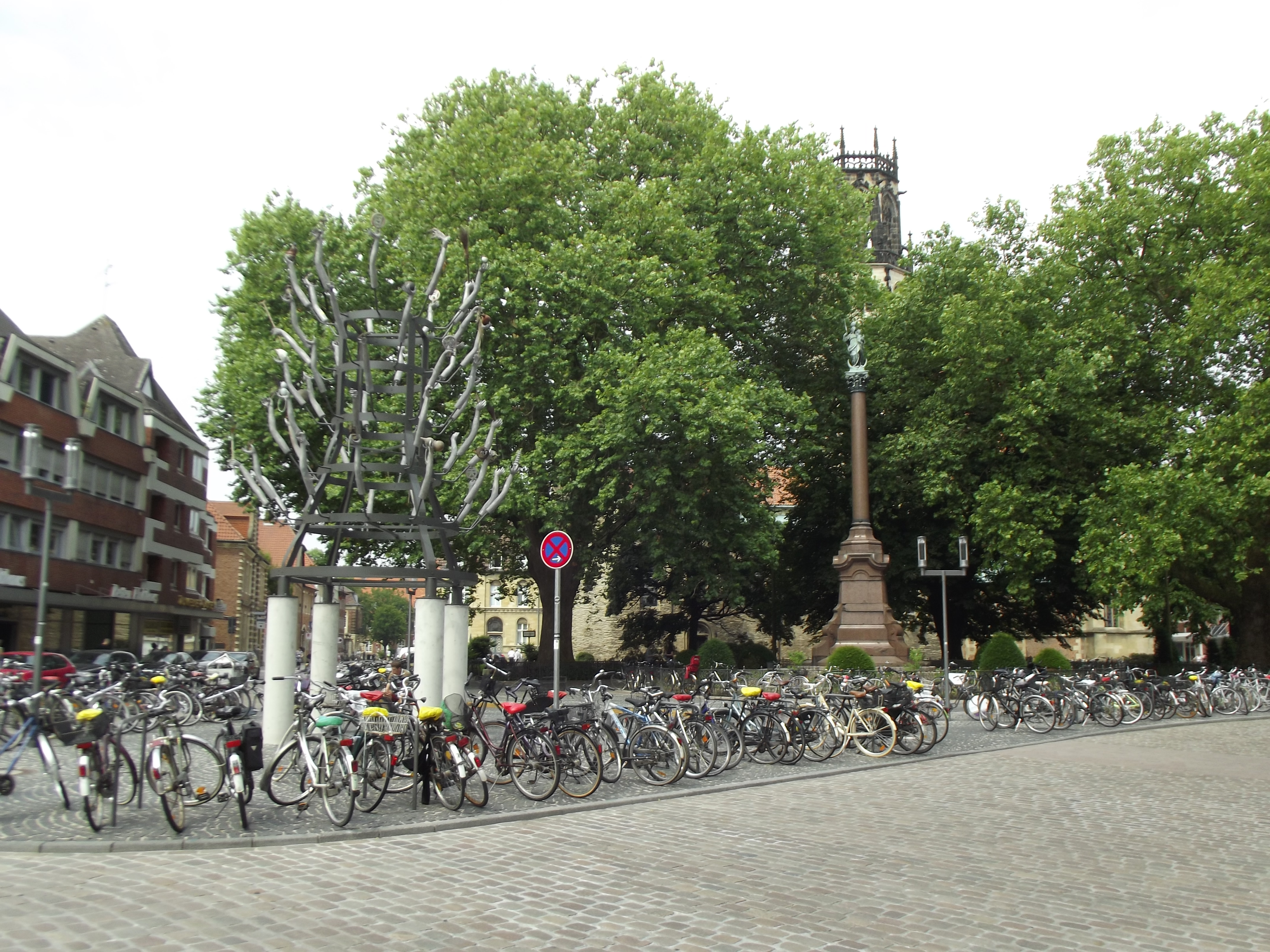
Marienplatz Münster Centre

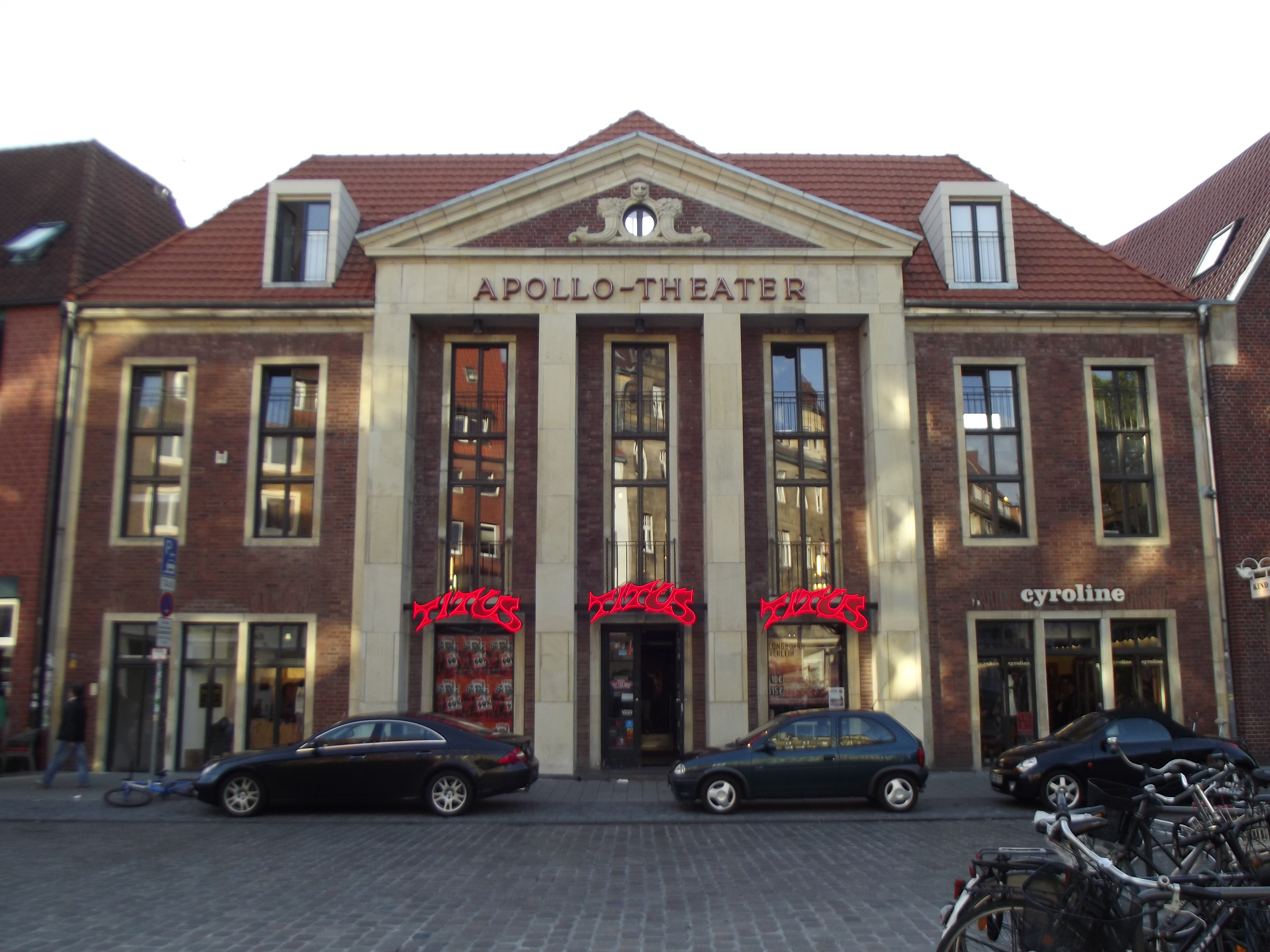
Old Apollo cinema, Marienplatz

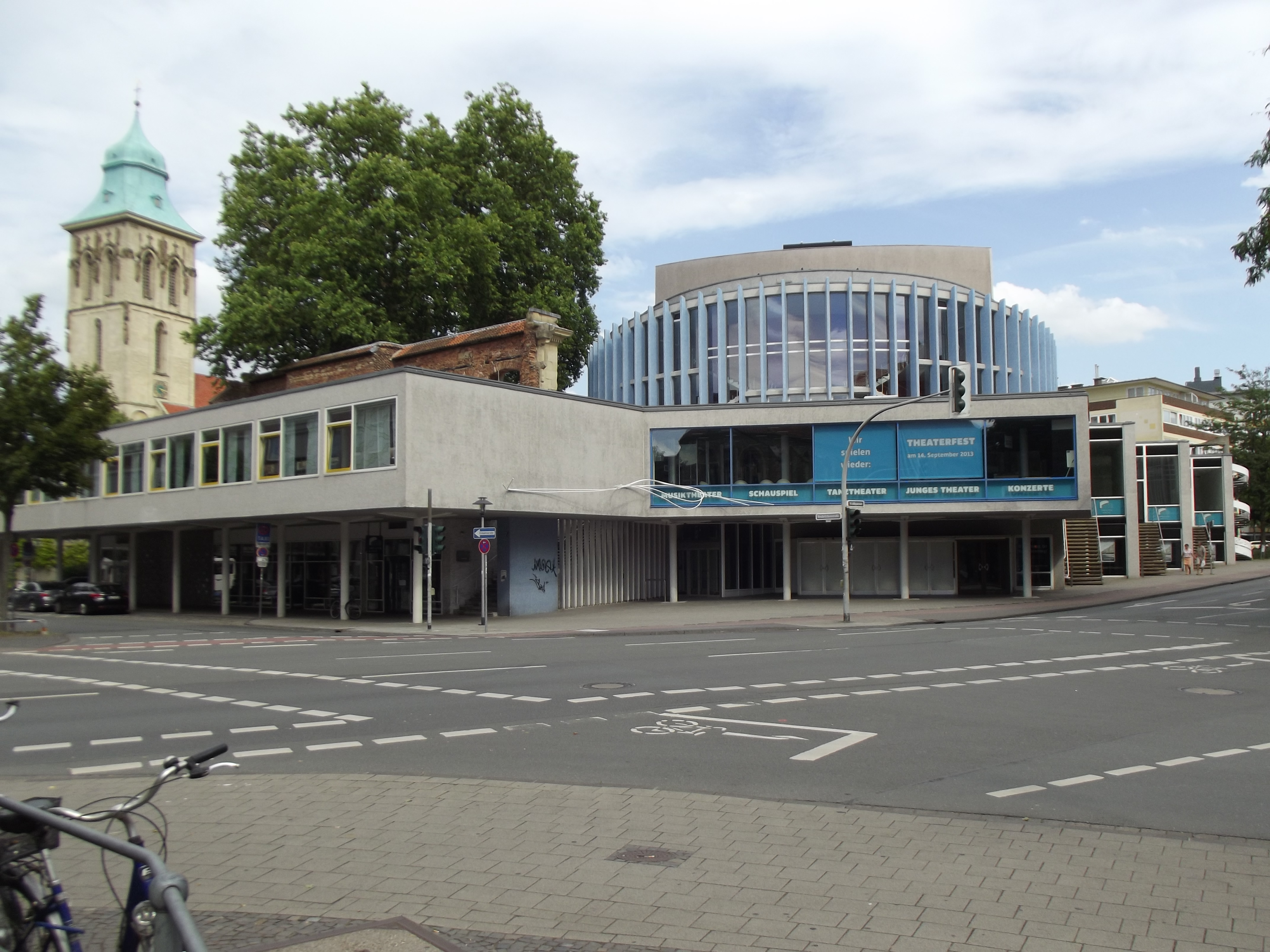
Münster's municipal theatre

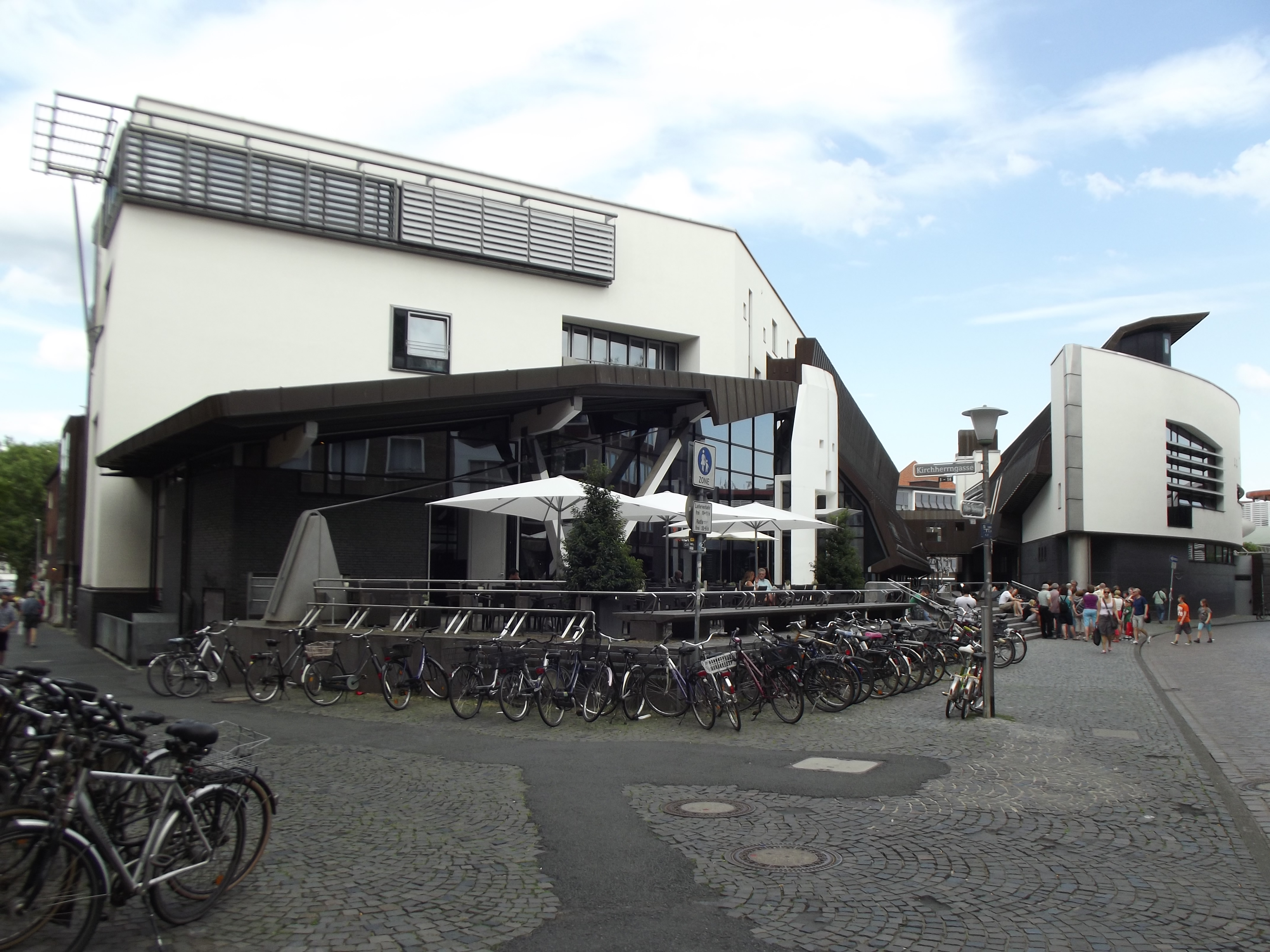
Public Library, Centre

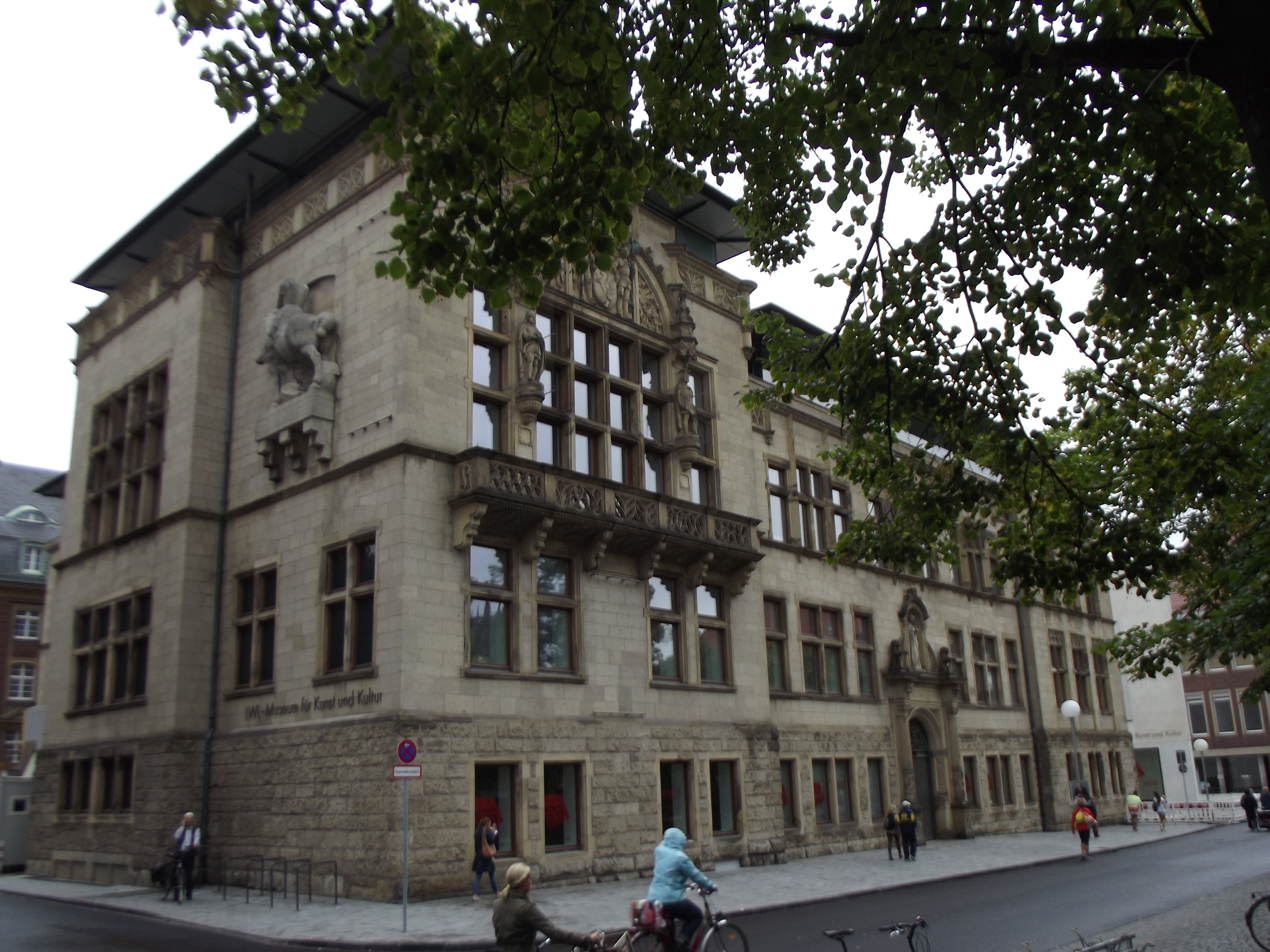
Landesmuseum Münster

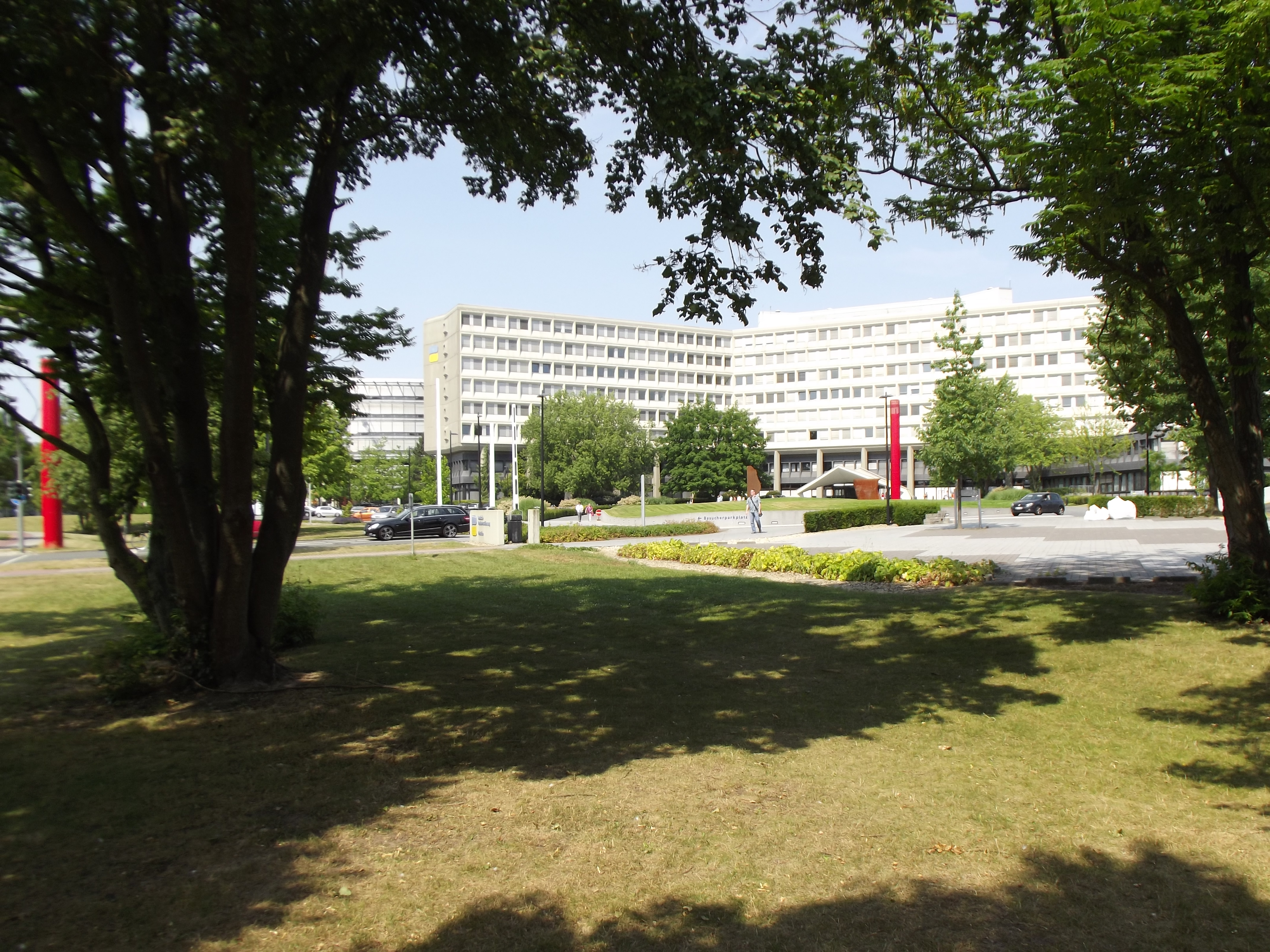
LVA (State Social Insurance Board) Münster-Nord

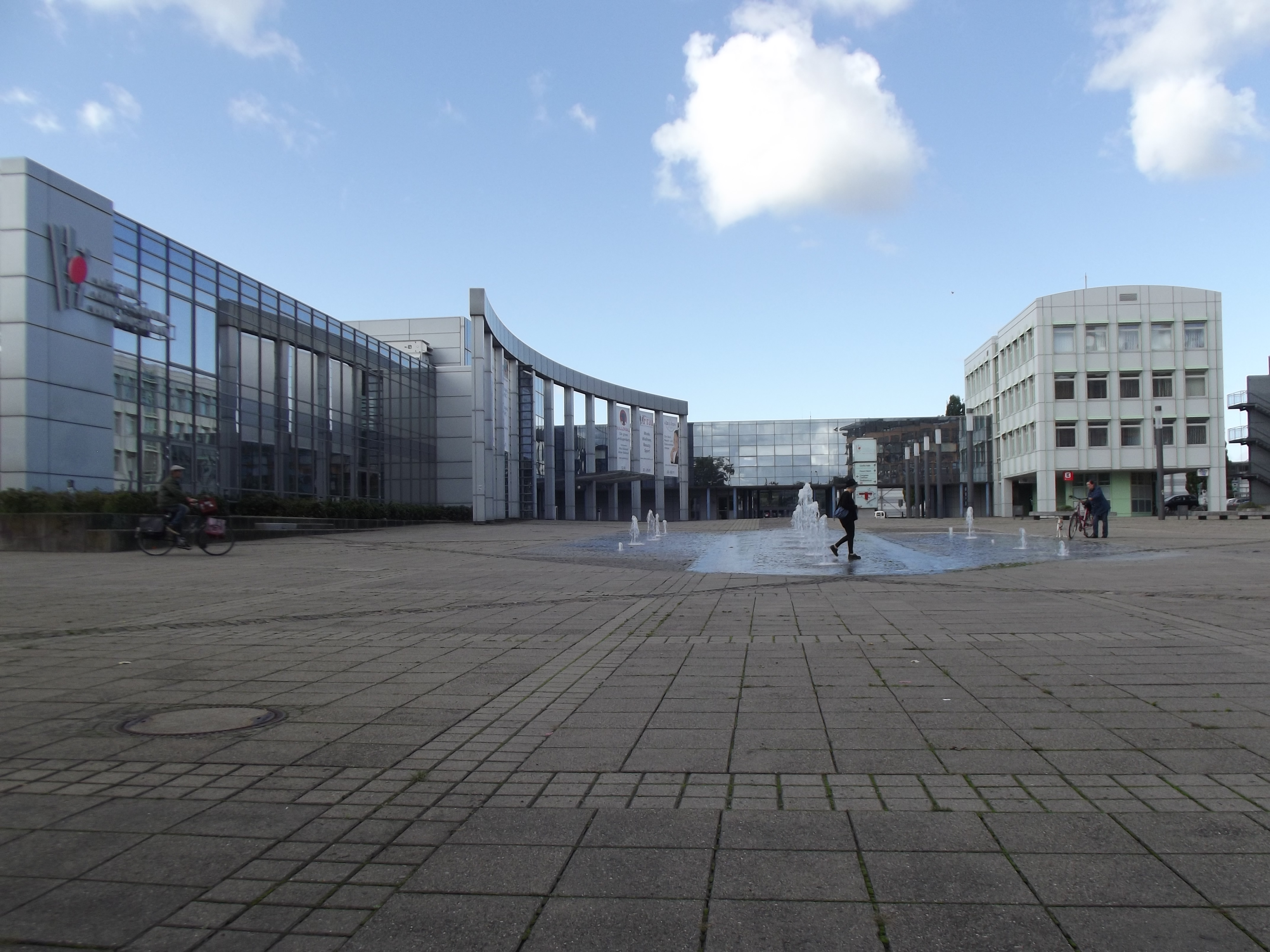
Trade Fair Centre Münster

== See also ==
- Munster, Lower Saxony
- Munster Province, Republic of Ireland
- CeNTech
- Fernmeldeturm
- Muenster, Texas, U.S.
- H-Blockx
- Minster, Ohio, U.S.
