= Janus Dousa Jr. =

Dutch classics scholar, historian and Leiden university librarian

Johan Van der Does Junior (Janus Dousa Junior)
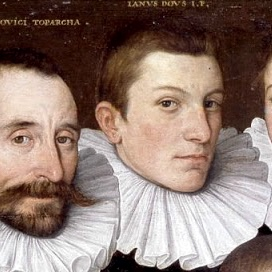
- Roelof Willemsz. van Culemborg: Johan Van der Does (right) with his father (left), detail of a Van der Does family portrait, 1590-1592.
- Born: 16 January 1571; Noordwijk
- Died: 26 December 1596 (aged 25); The Hague

Academic background
- Education: Leiden University

Academic work
- Era: Dutch Renaissance
- Discipline: Classical languages, library science
- Institutions: Leiden University

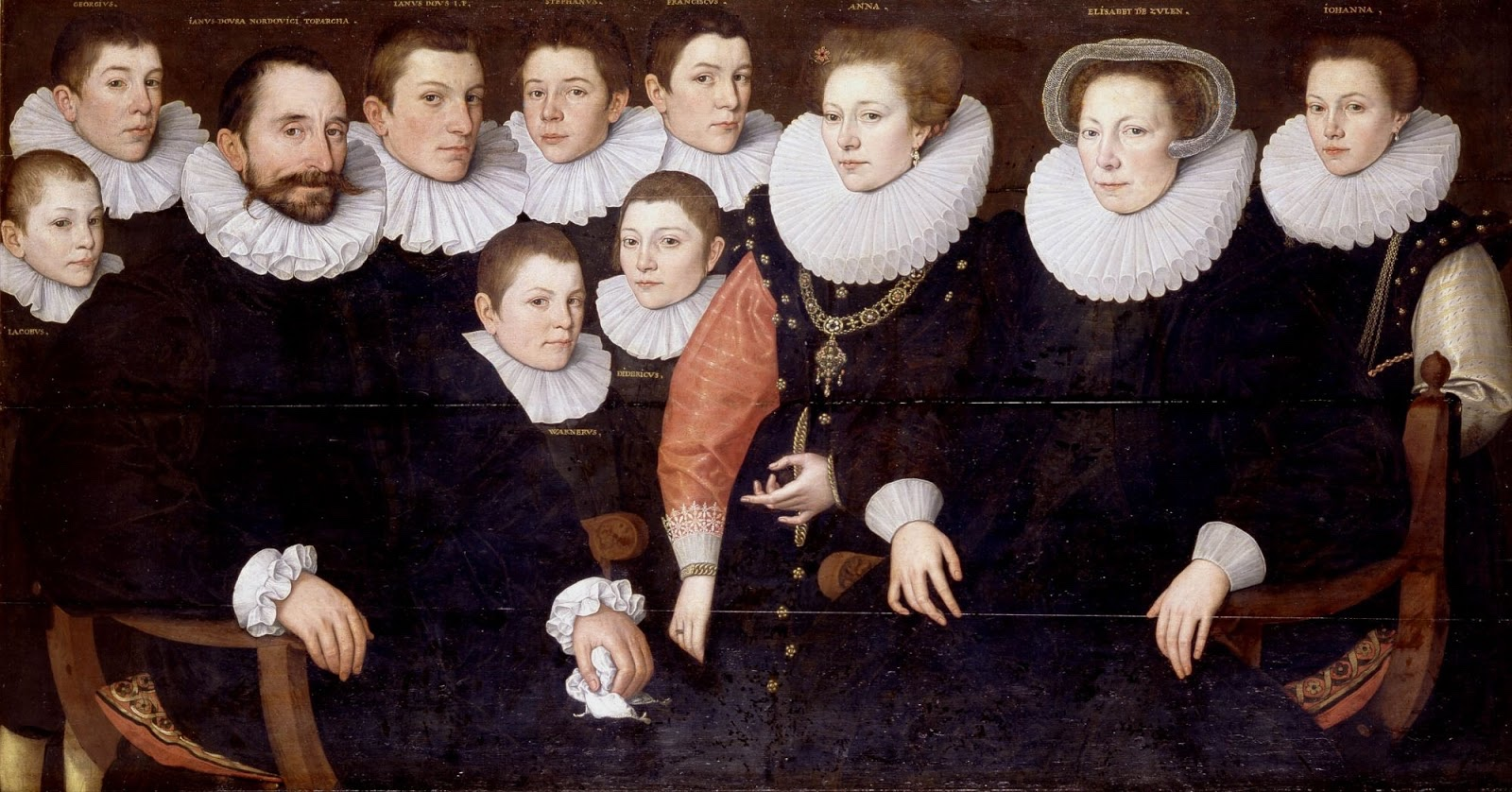
Roelof Willemsz. van Culemborg: Group portrait of Jan van der Does, his wife Elisabeth van Zuylen (both seated) and their family, 1590-1592. To the left father Jan with to his right Johan Jr. Also shown is the classical scholar and poet Franciscus Dousa (1577-1630), the fourth son of Janus Dousa senior and younger brother of Junior. Museum De Lakenhal, Leiden.

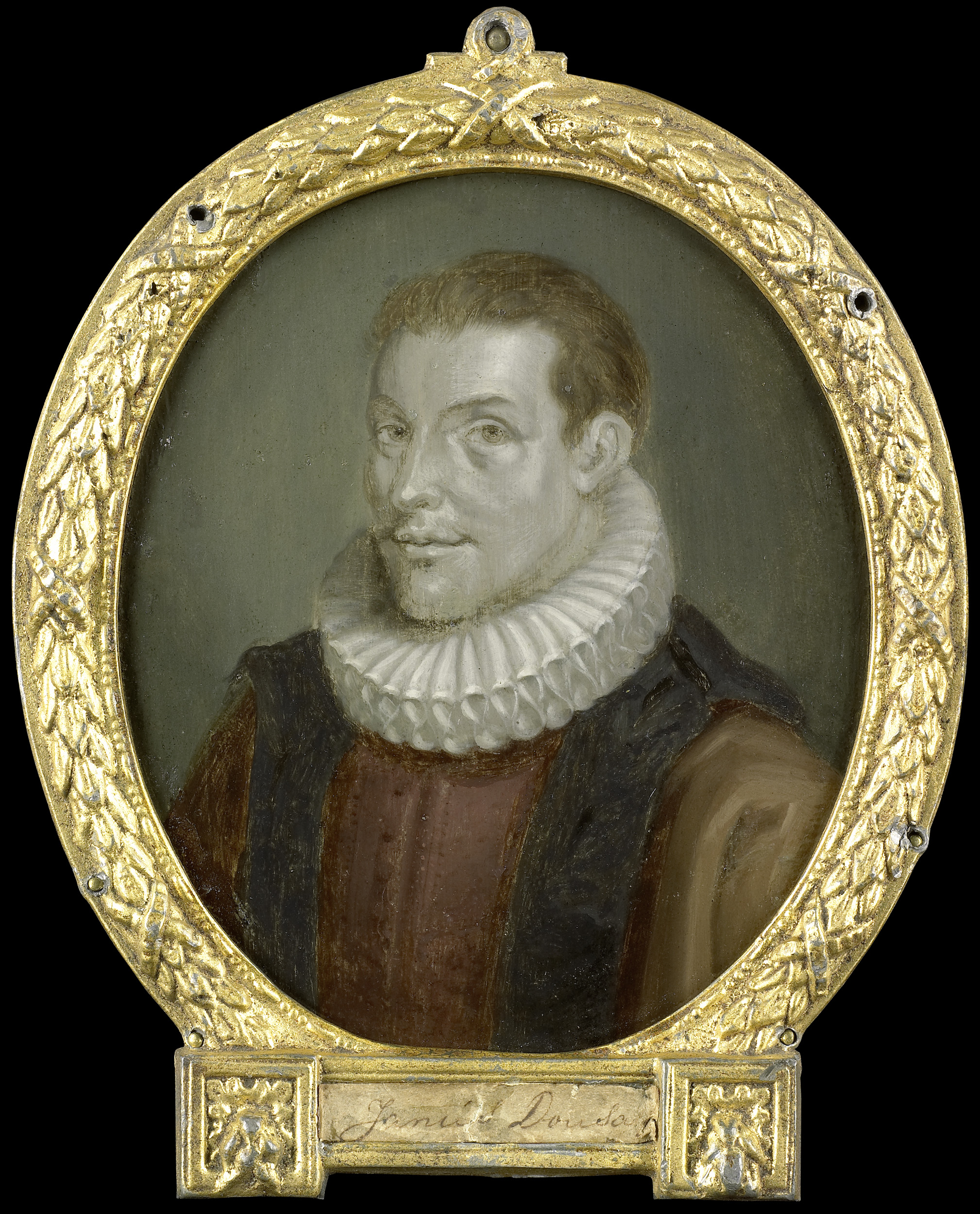
Arnoud van Halen, 1700 - 1732: Johan van der Does de Jonge (Jr., 1571-96). Librarian at Leiden. After an engraving.

Janus Dousa Jr. (Latinized from Johan van der Does, also Janus Dousa filius, Janus II Dousa, Janus Dousa the younger, 16 January 1571 - 26 December 1596) was a Dutch classics scholar, Neo-Latin poet, historian and the second librarian of the young Leiden University (1593-1596).

== Biography ==
=== Young years ===
Dousa Jr., the eldest son and the first of ten children of Janus Dousa (Johan van der Does, Dousa Sr.), was born at Noordwijk but in 1573 his family moved to Leiden, where his father was in command during the second siege by the Spanish army (26 May–3 October 1574). He was taught the classics by his father and at a young age excelled in languages. He was then, for instance, already well versed in writing Neo-Latin poetry. Johannes Meursius called Junior "verum Gratiarum pullum" (a true chick of the Charites). Janus Dousa Jr. concluded his studies at Leiden University in Latin, Greek, Hebrew, Roman law, mathematics and astronomy, with professors Peter Tiara (Petreius Tiara, Pieter Tjeerts, Greek language), Bonaventura Vulcanius, Justus Lipsius, and Petrus Bertius in 1583. He assisted his father in literary studies and library activities. In 1594 he tutored Frederick Henry, Prince of Orange for a short time, when the prince was a student at Leiden University.

In the summer of 1585, Dousa Sr. led an informal Dutch embassy to England to investigate a possible Anglo-Dutch union, later leading to the failed military mission of Robert Dudley, 1st Earl of Leicester and his nephew the poet Philip Sidney to the Netherlands. A small group of Leiden Neo-Latin poets, including Dousa Jr., his friend Dominicus Baudius and Georgius Benedicti Wertelos, visited London in the summer and autumn of 1585 and met with fellow English poets.

=== Librarian of Leiden University 1593-1596 ===
When his father Dousa Sr. was appointed a member of the Hoge Raad in 1591, Junior assumed the duties of his father as a pro tem university librarian and succeeded him officially on 15 July 1593, at the age of 21, so becoming the second librarian of the young Leiden University. On a two-year journey through Europe including Germany and Poland with two of his brothers starting in 1594 he fell ill and died shortly after his return at The Hague in 1596, at the age of 25.

=== Reputation ===
Notwithstanding his young age, Junior was considered a significant scholar, so that his portrait graces the frieze of the Bodleian Library at Oxford. In 1612, Leiden library curators commissioned five portraits of scholars considered outstanding, with Junior alongside his father Janus Dousa Sr., Justus Lipsius, Johannes Heurnius and Henricus Junius.

Leiden University's leading professor Joseph Justus Scaliger mourned the untimely death of his student: « Jamais je n’ai pleuré de mort que lui, mais je l’ai pleuré à bon escient. Il mourait tout en parlant ; il ne sentait point de mal. Le pauvre Janus était si bon et si simple ! Je pleuray huit jours durant comme une vieille, lorsqu'il fut mort.» (Translation from the French: I have never cried for anyone's death but his, but I cried for him with good reason. He died while talking; he felt no pain. Poor Janus was so kind and simple! I cried for eight days like an old woman when he died.) During his absence and after his decease, Petrus Bertius stood in for Janus Dousa Junior as the university librarian.

== Quotations ==
=== Epigram for the historian Van Meteren, 1585 ===
Latin epigram by Janus Dousa Jr. at age 14 as a tribute contribution to the Album Amicorum presented to the Flemish historian Emanuel van Meteren

Mens mihi in ambiguo utrum tua iussa secutus
Inscalpam libro carmina pauca tuo;
An potius nihil hic ausus, metuensque tot inter
Obscurum artifices nomen habere viros
Nil scribam, reddamque tibi hoc inglorius Album
Nomine denigrare ipse meo veritus :
Sed quoniam tibi maiori parere necesse est,
Qui me sis factus paene senex puero,
Effigiem tibi non aliquam aut insignia pingam
Maiorum, at male natum hoc Epigramma dabo.
Ergo cape EMANUEL manum monimenta mearum,
Ingeniique modo non puerilis opus,
'Mnemostunon filias' aeternum mique tibique,
Dum notus terris sit vetus EMANUEL.

D. EMANUELI DEMETRIO mercatorum doctissimo, amicitiae
paternae caussa scripsi hoc qualecunque Epigramma JANUS DOUSA filius.
Londini Anno 1585. Aetatis vero 14.

— Janus Dousa Jr.
Translation:

While doubting in my mind whether following your orders
I'll engrave a few poems in your book;
Or rather not risking anything here, fearing that among so many
expert artists I with an obscure name
will write nothing, and return to you this Album as a nobody,
worrying that I smirch my name:
But since of course i must obey a senior, you,
Who has made a wise old man of me out of hardly a boy,
I'll paint you not some portrait nor coats of arms
Of my ancestors, but I'll give you this feeble born Epigram.
Therefore, receive, EMANUEL, the memorials by my hands,
and so the work of a nearly childish talent,
A 'Mnemostunon filias' [Greek: A friendship memorial] eternal for me and you,
As long as the old EMANUEL be known throughout the world.

To Mr. EMANUEL DEMETRIUS, most learned of merchants, for paternal friendship's sake
I have written this sort of Epigram, JANUS DOUSA son. London, 1585. Aged 14.

=== Rerum Coelestium, 1591 ===
Jani Dousae filii Rerum Coelestium Liber primus. Ad Illustrem virum Henricum Ranzovium Vicarium Regis Daniae

[1] Astra renitenti subterlabentia Mundo,
Et toties superis implexos orbibus orbes,
Sideraque in multas caelum laqueantia formas,
Errantumque choros varios, atque aurea Divum
[5] Tecta canam. Tu, per quem olim discordia rerum
Semina concordi coierunt pace ligata,
Praescriptosque tenent aeterno foedere fines,
Frigida ne calidis pugnent, aut humida siccis;

O qui stelliferi supra spatia ardua Mundi
[10] Ignigenos habitas tractus atque avia regna;
Quem coeli Indigetes unum venerantur, & omnis
Observat superûm pictis exercitus alis,
Magne Parens , tua dum in populos juvar edere facta,
[14] Annue tam grandi coepto & juvenilibus ausis.

— Janus Dousa Filii: Poemata, Rerum Coelestium Liber Primus opening Latin verses, p. 16.
Translation:

(Translation) Janus Dousa Son: First Book of the Heavens. To the illustrious man Henricus Ranzovius (Heinrich Rantzau), Governor for the King of Denmark.

[1] Of stars gliding down in a gleaming Universe,
and orbits so often entangled in higher orbits,
also of sky-paneling constellations in many shapes,
and various choruses of wanderers [i.e., planets] and of the Gods' golden
[5] ceilings I shall sing. You, by whom once the different
atoms of things came together bound by harmonious peace,
and in eternal covenant uphold prescribed bounds.
Let the cold not fight the heat, nor the wet the dry.

O who above the starry Universe's lofty spaces
[10] lives in fiery regions and remote kingdoms
Whom alone heaven's Powers venerate, and [who]
Watches the armies of the Gods with completely painted wings,
Great Parent, because it pleases to divulge your work to the nations,
[14] Nod approvingly to such a great undertaking and youthful endeavours.

== Publications ==
Janus Dousa Junior's publications include:

=== History ===
- Dousa, Janus; Dousa, Janus Junior (1601). Bataviae Hollandiaeque annales: a Iano Dousa filio concepti atque inchoati iam olim; nunc vero a patre eidem cognomine ac superstite, Nordovici domino, supremi concilii adsessore, tum archivorum in Batavis custodiae praefecto, recogniti, suppleti, novaque octo librorum accessione ad integrae usque decades finem perducti et continuati [Annals of Batavia and Holland: conceived and started long ago by Janus Dousa Junior; now by his surviving father of the same name, Lord of Noordwijk, advisor of the Hoge Raad, former state archivist, revised, supplemented, and ... eight books? brought to a complete end and continued to the end of the decade.] (in Latin). Lugduni-Batavorum. p. 500. OCLC 151178952. Dousa Jr. wrote the first part ‘Batavia’ (pages 1–47), book 8 with an insert by his father presumably (403-410), book 9 and 10 with another insert by his father at pages 481-495 describing the Holland Count Dirk V.
  - reprinted in de Groot, Hugo; Johan (Janus), van der Does Sr. (Dousa); Johan (Janus), van der Does Jr. (Dousa) (1617). Chronicon Hollandiae. De Hollandorum republica et rebus gestis commentarii Hugonis Grotii Iani Dousae patris Iani Dousae filii. Leiden: Johan Maire. The reprint is preceded by Grotius' Liber de antiquitate reipublicae Batavicae.
- Annales Hollandiae prosa oratione.

=== Classical authors' editions with commentaries ===
Commentaries on the classical authors Catullus, Petronius, Propertius, Plautus and Tibullus.

- Dousa, Janus (1592). Catullus, Tibullus, Propertius, jampridem viri docti judicio castigati, et nunc denuo recogniti ac variis lectionibus et notis illustrati a Jano Dousa filio. Accessit Pervigilium Veneris. - Jani Dousae filii In Catullum, Tibullum, Propertium conjectanea et notae ... Item Jani Dousae patris in Propertium paralipomena. [In Pervigilium Veneris notata Justo Lipsio, "Electorum I.", cap. V.] (in Latin). Leiden Batavorum: Franciscus Raphelengius, ex officina Plantiniana. OCLC 458304915.
  - Conjectanea et notæ in Catullum, Tibullum et Propertium (Conjectures and notes on Catullus, Tibullus and Propertius), following his edition of these poets, Leiden, 1592.
- Spicilegium in Petronii Arbitri Satyricon (Leftovers about the Satyricon by Petronius Arbiter). Lugd. Bat. [Leiden] 1594. 12mo. Reprinted several times.
- Iani Dousae Filii Animadversiones In M. Acci Plauti Comoedias (Remarks on the Comedies by M. Accius Plautus by Janus Dousa Jr.), in Plautus, M. Accius (1598). Dousa, Ianus (ed.). M. Accius Plauti, comici, fabulae superstites XX, ex recensione Dousica, recens magno studio et quanta fieri potuit, accurata diligentia editae. Frankfurt: Petrus Kopffius, Joannes Saurius. pp. 784–804. OCLC 1281887266.. Scan "Plautus, Titus Maccius: M. ACCI. PLAVTI, COMICI, FABVLAE SVPER-STITES XX. Ex ... , 1598". digital.staatsbibliothek-berlin.de. Berlin: Staatsbibliotheek zu Berlin, Stabi Digitalisierte Sammlungen.

=== Original Neo-Latin poetry ===
- Jani Dousae filii Poemata olim a patre collecta, nunc ab amicis edita [Poems by Jan Dousa the son, once collected by his father, now published by his friends] (in Latin). Lugduni Bat.: A. Cloucquium. 1607. OCLC 458361204. 227 pages.
  - Rabus, Willem, ed. (1704). Jani Dousae filii Poemata [Poems of Janus Dousa Junior] (in Latin). Rotterdam: Adrianus van Dijk. OCLC 782087287. 212 pages. Reprint of 1607 edition.
  - "Digitale Sammlungen Jani Dousae filii Poemata". digital.ulb.hhu.de (in Latin). Universitäts- und Landesbibliothek Düsseldorf, Heinrich Heine Universität Düsseldorf. Provides a hyperlink to the PDF scan of Jani Dousae filii Poemata [52.85 MB]. This book includes Rerum Coelestium Liber Primus, Silvae (genre Silvae), Elegiaca, Funera, Odae, Jambi, Erotopaegnion, Elogia, Epigrammata puerilia, and Epigrammata juvenilia.
- Dousa, Ianus F; Molinaeus (Du Moulin), Petrus (Pierre) (1594). In nuptias Mart. Pilii I.C. et lectissimæ Ianæ Olivariæ epithalamia. Lugd. Bat. [Leiden]: Franciscus Raphelengius. OCLC 69075722.
- Brittannicorum Carminum Sylva, Lugd. Bat. 1586. 4o. (following Janus Dousa Sr. Odae Brittannicae.)
- Rerum coelestium: in laudem Umbrae declamatio et carmen: una cum aliquot poëmatiis. Lugd. Bat. [Leiden]. 1591.
  - in van der Wowern, Johan (1636). Dies æstiva, sive De vmbra pægnion. Unà cum Iani Dousæ F. in eandem declamatione. Oxford: William Turner, William Webb. OCLC 606543483.
- Farrago variorum carminum (Farrago of various poems).

=== Letters and Other ===
- Letters 1586, 1591-1596.
- Janus Dousa junior in 1592 curated the captions of Goltzius' portraits of the scholars Julius Caesar Scaliger and his son Josephus Justus Scaliger.

== Secondary literature ==
- Berkvens-Stevelinck, Christiane (2012). Magna commoditas : Leiden University's great asset : 425 years library collections and services. Translated by UvA Talen, Amsterdam. Leiden: Leiden University Press. pp. 23, 29–31, 83, 95 (portrait Janus Dousa Jr. at p. 30). ISBN 9789087281656. OCLC 794706996.
- Marijke, Spies (1999). Rhetoric, rhetoricians, and poets : studies in Renaissance poetry and poetics. Amsterdam: Amsterdam University Press. pp. 30, 35–36. ISBN 9789048505760. OCLC 607724585.
- IJsewijn, Jozef; Sacré, Dirk (1990–1998). Companion to neo-latin studies. Supplementa Humanistica Lovaniensia, 5, 15. Leuven: Leuven University Press. ISBN 9789068312249. OCLC 758204354.. Part I: p 152, part II: p. 78.

== Portraits ==
- Anonymous, circa 1612. Oil on panel 62.5x51 cm. UBL Icones 54 Shelfmark Icones 54. A copy of the family portrait by Roeloff Willemsz. van Culemborg, Museum De Lakenhal, Leiden. Probably painted on behalf of the Curators.
- van Halen, Arnoud (1700–1732). "Portrait of Johan van der Does the Younger, Librarian in Leiden". rijksmuseum.nl. Amsterdam. Bust in an oval, facing left. Part of a collection of Dutch poets' portraits. Rijksmuseum Amsterdam SK-A-4558. Oil on metal. Published in van Halen, Arnoud; de Roode, Michiel (1773). Arnoud van Halen's Pan Poëticon Batavûm: verheerlijkt door lofdichten en bijschriften. Leiden: Genootschap Kunst wordt door arbeid verkregen. OCLC 914260470.
- engraving, in van Meurs, Johannes (1625). Athenae Batavae. Sive de urbe Leidensi, et Academia, virisque claris; qui utramque ingenio suo, atque scriptis, illustrarunt: libri duo. Leiden: Andries Clouck. OCLC 1190949363.
