= Michiel Hillen van Hoochstraten =

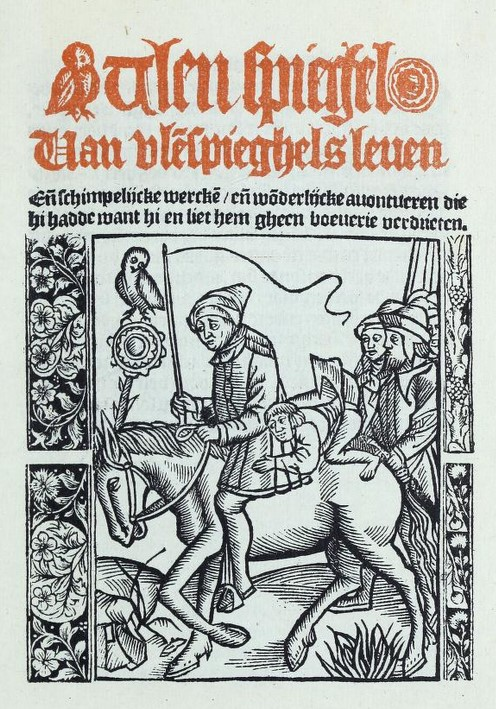
Frontispiece of first Dutch language Ulenspieghel, 1525-1546

Michiel Hillen van Hoochstraten or Michel Hillenius (Hoogstraten, c. 1476, – Antwerp, 22 July 1558), was a Flemish printer, publisher, bookseller and bookbinder. His printing press put out publications in a wide range of genres, including imperial ordinances, almanacs, devotional literature, anthologies of customs, textbooks, etc. He also printed humanistic writings by Erasmus, Adrianus Barlandus and Jacobus Latomus as well as the first Dutch-language version of the story of Till Eulenspiegel. His multiple editions of the Bible in Dutch translation were among the first to be published. Michiel Hillen van Hoochstraten is regarded as the most important publisher active in Antwerp in the first half of the sixteenth century.

== Life ==
Michiel Hillen van Hoochstraten was the son of Jan Hillen and Catharina Dibbouts and was born between 1470 and 1485 in Hoogstraten, north of Antwerp. This explains why later he added the words van Hoochstraten (from Hoogstraten) to his family name Hillen. His parents owned some properties in his hometown.

Michiel became active in Antwerp in 1506, officially as a bookbinder. He also operated as a book printer, publisher and bookseller. In 1508 Hillen was registered as a citizen of Antwerp. He moved the location of his printing press a number of times but he remained within the well-known 'print district' of Antwerp. In 1518 he bought a house on the Cammerstraat which bore the name "In den Rape" (In the Turnip). Here he ran his printing business until 1546.

After the death of his son Jan who also worked in his workshop, he handed over his printing business in 1546 to his son-in-law Joannes (Jan) Steels who was married to his daughter Margareta. Michiel Hillen died on 22 July 1558.

== Publishing activities ==
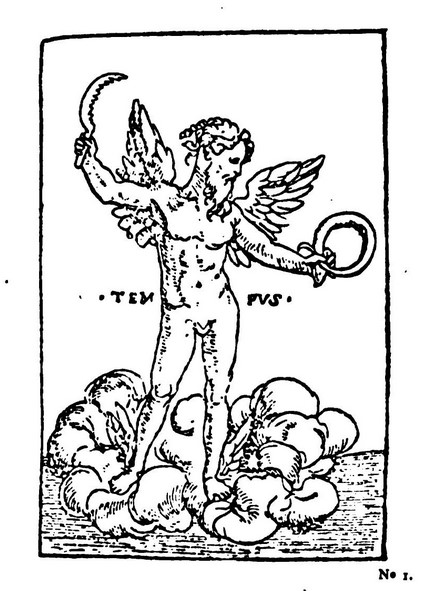
Printer's mark of Michiel Hillen van Hoochstraten

Michiel Hillen van Hoochstraten printed and published works in a diverse range of genres. This included imperial ordinances, anthologies of local laws and customs, almanacs, textbooks, etc. He also printed many of the humanistic writings by local writers such as Erasmus, Adrianus Barlandus and Latomus. He further produced books for the English market. The art of printing developed rather late in England. As a result, foreign book printers, including those from Antwerp, played an important role in supplying the English market. Hillen published for the English market Johann Eck's anti-Lutheran publication Enchi ridion locorum communium aduersus Lutheranos (printed for the English printer Henry Pepwell) and an edition of the Sarum Hymns and Sequences. In addition he published in 1530 The practyse of prelates by the English reformer William Tyndale, who resided in Antwerp beginning from 1528. In this work Tyndale criticized the divorce of Henry VIII. The first page of Hillen van Hoochstraten's print of Tyndale's work carried a false printing location, i.e. Marburg. Hillen also published the English edition of the Book of Genesis from 1530.

Michiel Hillen van Hoochstraten printed a Dutch version of the Till Eulenspiegel story. This book recounts the life of Till Eulenspiegel, a trickster who plays practical jokes on his contemporaries, especially of a scatological nature and exposes his vices at every turn. His life is set in the first half of the 14th century, and the final chapters of the chapbook describe his death from the plague of 1350. The first known chapbook on Eulenspiegel was printed in c. 1510–1512 in Strasbourg. It is reasonable to place the folkloristic origins of the tradition in the 15th century. The first German edition was published by Johann Grüninger in Strasbourg in 1515. Michiel Hillen van Hoochstraten did not base his version on the Grüninger edition but on an earlier German text that is no longer extant. In the past, the Hillen edition was dated to 1512 or 1519, but recent scholarship places it in the period between 1525 and 1546. The Hillen edition is still considered to be the earliest Dutch language publication of the story. The Hillen edition is illustrated by woodcuts which are not executed in a polished style but are very direct and picturesque. The frontispiece shows Eulenspiegel's father riding a mule while his son is perched on its buttocks and is anxiously holding on to his father's sides. On the mule's head stands an upright hand mirror with an owl sitting on it. This is a reference to the hero Eulenspiegel's name, which translates literally to Owl mirror. The only extant copy of Hillen's Eulenspiegel is in the Royal Library of Denmark in Copenhagen. This copy has some pages missing.

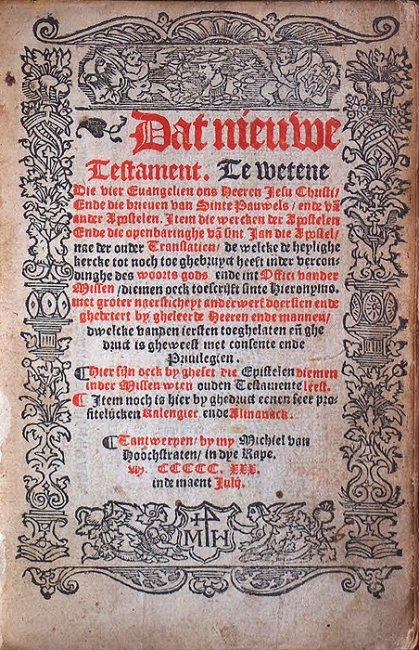
Frontispiece of Dutch language version of the New Testament, 1530

Michiel Hillen van Hoochstraten printed in 1527 a Dutch translation of the New Testament. It was an adapted version of the Erasmus translation that was published in 1524 by Cornelis Lettersnijder in Delft. Van Hoochstraten aligned his version of the New Testament more closely with that of the Latin Vulgate. In a reprint from 1530 he continued this trend and made further adjustments. He probably intended to establish an ecclesiastically approved text reflecting the prevalent view in the study of scripture in his day. He reprinted this version of the New Testament in 1531 while a year later he published a reprint of the text of his 1527 edition. None of these editions were placed on the Index of forbidden books, a list of publications deemed heretical, or contrary to morality by the Sacred Congregation of the Index (a former Dicastery of the Roman Curia). This meant that the Catholic Church did not probit Catholics to read them.

Michiel Hillen also printed a number of 'heretical' works. Although he published a number of these works under his own name, to avoid problems with the censors he also published others without mentioning a printer, or using a pseudonym or a false address. Overall he remained a cautious businessman when compared to some of his fellow printers. While some titles from his print catalogue were placed on the Index of forbidden books, it appears he never ran foul of the authorities. It is possible that thanks to his large output, his works escaped the attention of the authorities.

Many of Hillen's publications are illustrated with woodcuts. These were either original works cut by Dirck Vellert and Jan Swart van Groningen, taken from incunables, or copied after works by Hans Holbein the Younger and French engravers.
