= Antonius Rufus (grammarian) =

Roman grammarian

Antonius Rufus was a Latin grammarian who was quoted by the rhetorician Quintilian and the grammarian Velius Longus. The scholiast on Horace who was historically called Cruquianus speaks of an Antonius Rufus who wrote plays both praetextatae and togatae, but whether he is the same as the grammarian is uncertain. This reference is considered by some scholars altogether unreliable.

The humanist Johann Glandorp, in his Onomasticon, states on the authority of Helenius Acron, the grammarian and commenter on Horace, that Antonius Rufus translated both Homer and Pindar, but there is no passage in Acron in which the name of Antonius Rufus occurs. Glandorp probably had in his mind the statement Cruquianus already referred to, and connected it with a line in Ovid, in which Rufus is spoken of as a lyric poet; but who this Rufus was, whether the same as Antonius Rufus or not, cannot be determined.
