= Jacobus Cruquius =

Flemish humanist

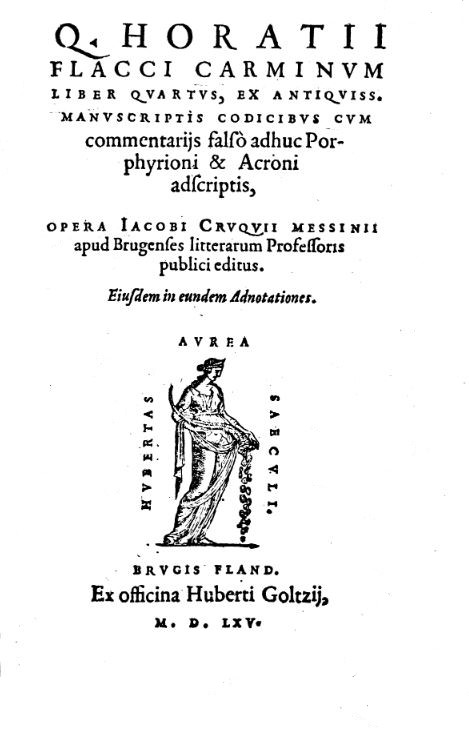
Title page of 'Q. Horatii Flacci Carminum, liber quartus', 1565 edition

Jacob Cruucke or Jacob van Cruyck, also known by his Latinized name Jacobus Cruquius and in French-language literature as Jacques de Crucque (Mesen, before 1520 - 22 June 1584) was a Flemish humanist, philologist, and scholar of the 16th century. He is mainly known for his publications on the works of the Roman lyric poet Horace based on ancient manuscripts kept in the library of a local monastery, since lost to fire.

== Life ==
Little is known about his early life and training. He enrolled in the Old University of Leuven on 29 August 1532 and graduated with the degree of magister artium on 18 February 1535. He afterwards studied law at the same university and obtained a licentiatus degree in canon law. While studying law, he also took courses with renowned humanists Conrad Goclenius and Petrus Nannius at the Collegium Trilingue, a college where Latin, Greek and Hebrew were taught.

In 1542, Cruucke was teaching Latin and Greek in a convent in Leuven. He applied for a position at the Collegium Trilingue to replace Nannius who was planning to leave for Italy. While he did not get the position as Nannius had called off his Italy trip, his application had drawn the attention of the theologian Georgius Cassander, who recommended Cruucke as his successor for his own teaching position at the Cuba foundation in Bruges. Cruucke replaced Cassander starting from 8 February 1543 until his death on 22 June 1584. The Cuba foundation was named after its founder, Jan de Witte (1475–1540), who had been bishop of Cuba from 1528 to 1530 and willed his money to establish a chair of “bonae litterae” (established in 1541) and a chair of theology (established in 1545) in Bruges.

Cruucke became a prominent intellectual in Bruges, on account of his large collection of books, as well as his collection of ancient coins. He taught many notable humanists of the age, including Jacobus Raevardus, Lucas Fruterius, Victor Giselinus, Janus Lernutius and Franciscus Modius. He was also in contact with leading humanists of his time such as Justus Lipsius who supported him in the publication of his books. Jacob van Cruycke also knew the Leiden University librarinan Janus Dousa in whose Album Amicorum he was asked to contribute a page in 1576. He added below his text a drawing of a jar, a reference to his Flemish name Cruucke or Cruycke which means 'jar'.

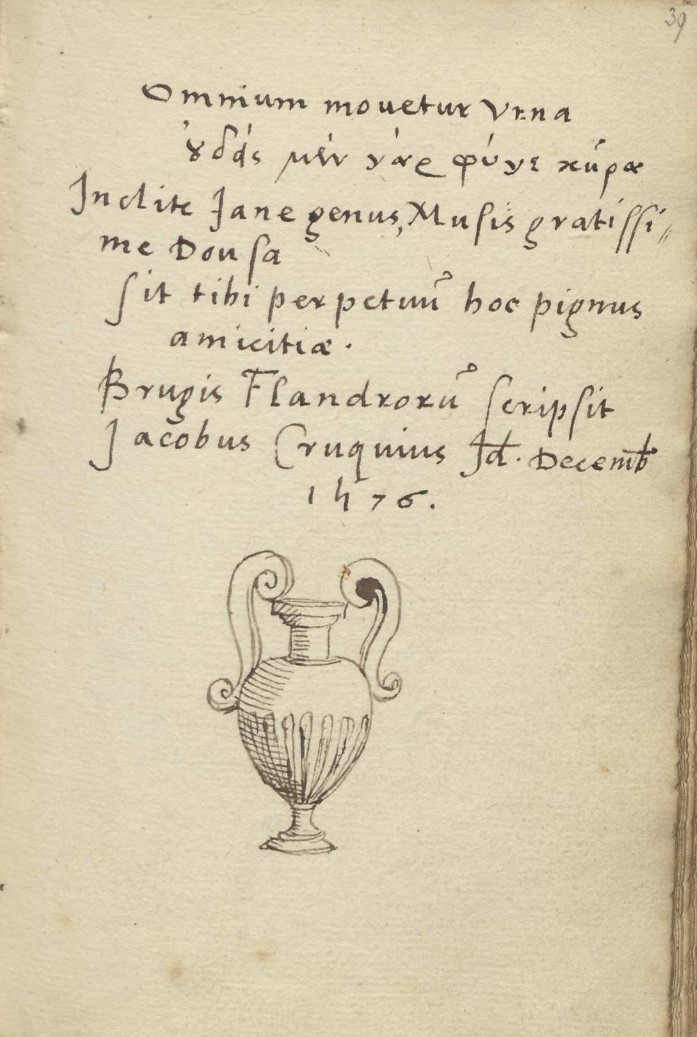
Jacobus Cruquius' entry in the Album Amicorum of Janus Dousa

Cruucke died in Bruges.

== Work ==
Cruucke is primarily known from his editions of the lyric poet Horace assembled from four ancient manuscripts in the library of the Benedictine monastery of St. Peter's Abbey, Ghent, which was located on top of a hill in the center of Ghent called the Blandijnberg. The monastery was colloquially called the " Blandijnklooster" and the manuscripts were thus referred to as the "Blandinian manuscripts". All four manuscripts were destroyed in 1566 in a fire at the monastery, leaving his edition as the sole surviving record of a number of commentaries not otherwise known, such as those made by the so-called "Commentator Cruquianus".

Of special interest is Cruucke's access to an extremely rare and ancient manuscript of Horace now referred to as V, variously known otherwise as Blandinius, Blandinius vetustissimus, or codex antiquissimus Blandinianus.

Cruucke published several separate volumes of this work from 1565 to 1578—the first with Hubert Goltzius then all the remainder with Christophe Plantin—and then one complete edition in 1578, and ultimately a standalone edition of Commentator Cruquianus's scholia. After his death, the editions were reprinted in 1597 with a small collection of notes from Janus Dousa.

While these editions were quite successful in their time, modern scholars question the merit of these works. Their popularity in the 16th and 17th centuries is attested to by the fact that all rare book collections in Western Europe hold at least one copy of one of Cruucke's editions, either in an original printing or one of the expanded versions from 1597.

== Publications ==
- Q. Horatii Flacci Carminum, liber quartus, with notes, Hubert Goltzius, Bruges, 1565.
- Q. Horatii Flacci Epodôn liber, with comments and notes, Christ. Plantin, Antwerp, 1567.
- Q. Horatii Flacci Satyrarum libri duo, with comments and corrections, Christ. Plantin, Antwerp, 1573.
- M. Tullii Ciceronis oratio pro Milone, with translation, Christ. Plantin, Antwerp, 1583.
