= Schottius =

Schottius may refer to:

- Andreas Schott (Andreas Schottius)
- Gaspar Schott (Caspar Schottius)
