= Lucas Fruytier =

Lucas Fruytier, Latinized Fruterius (1541–1566) was a Neo-Latin poet from the Low Countries.

Fruytier was born in Bruges in 1541. At an early age he gained a reputation for an elegant command of Latin. In Paris in 1565 he became friends with Janus Dousa and Janus Lernutius. He died in Paris in 1566, his early death attributed to drinking cold water too quickly after a vigorous tennis match. Victor Giselinus composed a Latin epitaph.

== Publications ==
His writings were edited for posthumous publication by Janus Dousa:

- Lucae Fruterii Brugensis, librorum, qui recuperari potuerunt, reliquiae: inter quos Verisimilium libri duo et versus miscelli (Antwerp, 1584)
