= Nicolaus Mulerius =

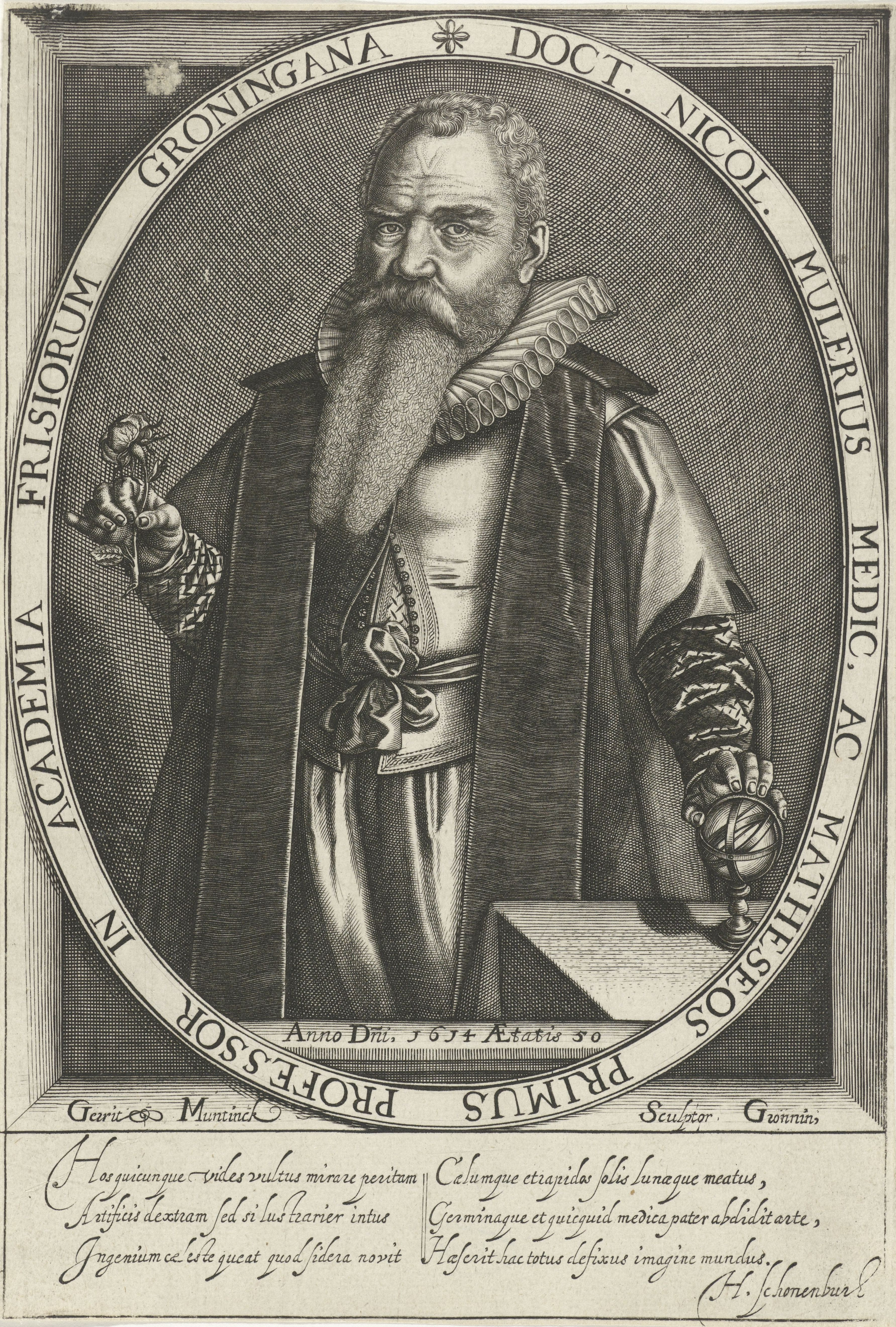
Nicolaus Mulerius

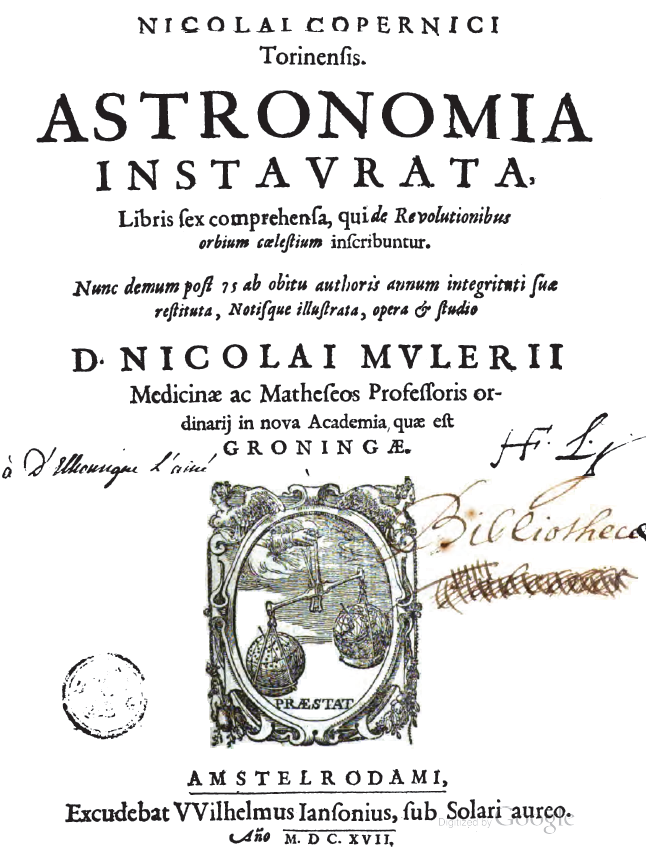
Title page of the 3rd ed. of De revolutionibus orbium coelestium, by Mulerius, 1617

Nicolaus Mulerius (25 December 1564, Bruges – 5 September 1630, Groningen) was a professor of medicine and mathematics at the University of Groningen.

== Education and career ==
Mulerius was born Nicolaas Des Muliers, son of Pierre Des Muliers and Claudia Le Vettre. He grew up in Bruges, where he was taught by Jacobus Cruquius, among others. Mulerius first studied Philology, Philosophy and Theology and from 1582 he also studied Medicine and Mathematics at the University of Leiden, where Lipsius, Vulcanius, Snellius and Heurnius were teachers. In 1589, he married Christina Six and set up practice for 13 years in Harlingen. In 1603, he became the leading physician in Groningen, in 1608 he took the position of school master of the Leeuwarden gymnasium. From 1614 he was professor of medicine and mathematics at the Groningen University. From 1619 – 1621 and 1626 – 1630, he was in charge of the library of the University of Groningen.

== Publications ==
In 1616, Nicolaus Mulerius published a textbook on astronomy reminiscent of the Sphere by Johannes de Sacrobosco.

Also in 1616, he published the third, updated and annotated edition of Nicolaus Copernicus' De revolutionibus orbium coelestium.

An account of the life of Ubbo Emmius, written by Nicolaus Mulerius, was published, with the lives of other professors of Groningen, at Groningen in 1638, eight years after Mulerius' death.

== Personal life ==
Mulerius married Christina Maria Six (1566-1645) in 1589 in Amsterdam. Among their children were Petrus Mulerius (1599-1647), who would become professor at Groningen in physics and botany from 1628, and Carolus Mulerius (1601-1638) who wrote the first grammar of Spanish in Dutch.

== Works ==
- Naturae tabulae Frisicae lunae-solares quadruplices, quibus accessere solis ..., 1611
- Institutionum astronomicarum libri duo, 1616
- Iudæorum annus lunæ-solaris: et Turc-Arabum annus merê lunaris,1630
- Naturae tabulae Frisicae lunae-solares quadruplices, quibus accessere solis ..., 1611
- Nicolai Mulerii ... Exercitationes in Apocalypsin s. Johannis apostoli, 1691

== Sources ==
- Lynn Thorndike : History of Magic and Experimental Science.
- Tabitta van Nouhuys: The Age of Two-Faced Janus: The Comets of 1577 and 1618 and the Decline of ... 1998
- Klaas van Berkel, Albert Van Helden, L. C. Palm: A History of Science in the Netherlands: Survey, Themes and Reference
- A.J. van der Aa, Biographisch Woordenboek der Nederlanden, 13th edition, 1876 (Dutch)

Nicolaus Mulerius (25 December 1564, Bruges – 5 September 1630, Groningen) was a professor of medicine and mathematics at the University of Groningen.
