= Valerius Andreas =

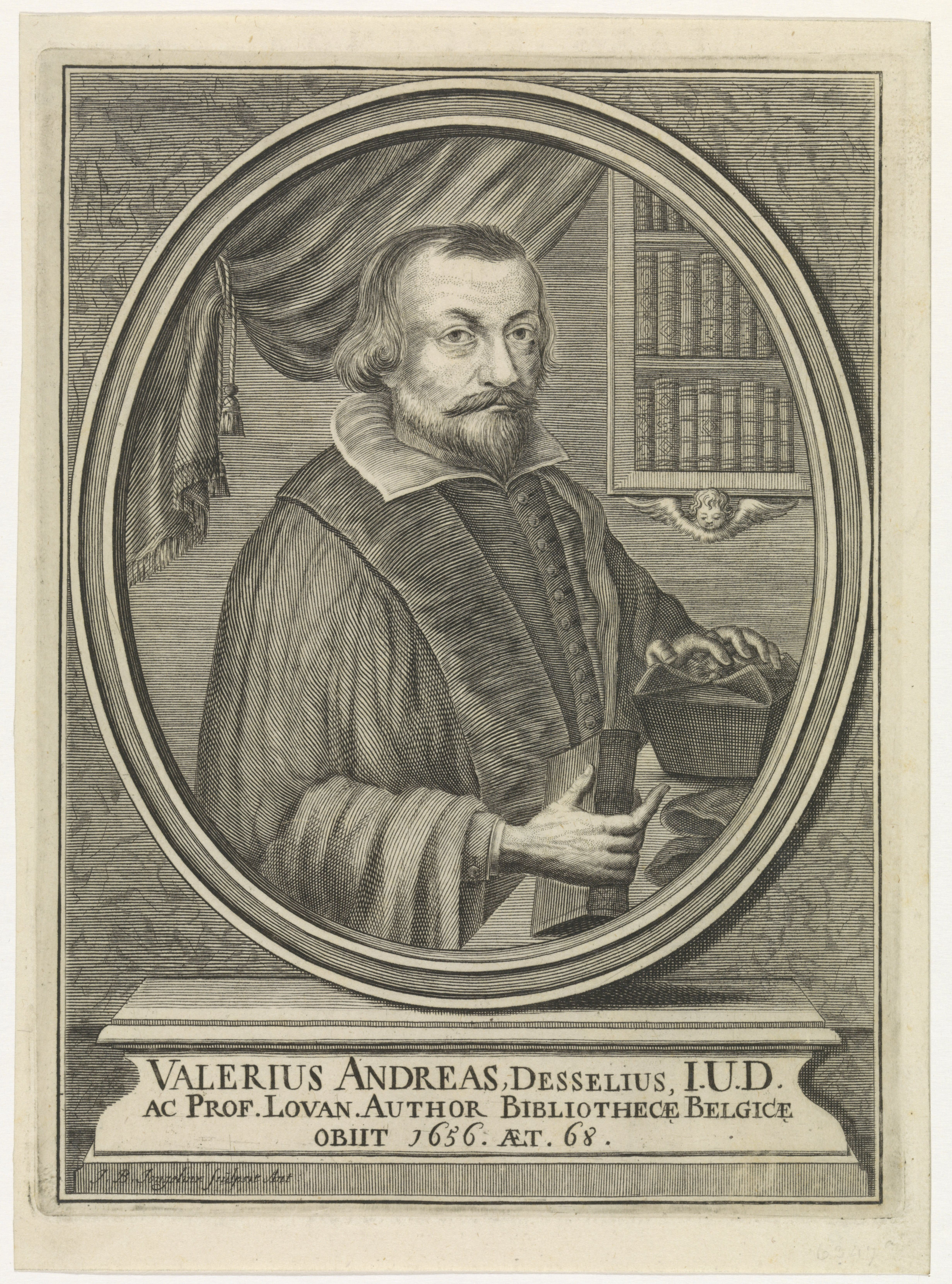

Wouter Dries or Walter Driessens (1588–1655), Latinized Valerius Andreas, was an academic jurist, Hebraist, and historian from the Duchy of Brabant in the Habsburg Netherlands.

== Life ==
Valerius was born in Dessel on 27 November 1588, the eldest son of Henricus Dries and Adriana Pauwels. He was educated by schoolmaster Walter van Hout in Dessel and then by the Jesuit Andreas Schott. He learned Hebrew from the Scottish Jesuit John Hay and graduated B.A. from Douai University. In 1610 he moved to Antwerp, where he became friends with Aubertus Miraeus and Franciscus Schott, brother of Andreas Schott. In 1611 he was appointed professor of Hebrew at the Collegium Trilingue at the Leuven University, delivering his inaugural lecture in 1612 and teaching there until his death.

On 21 August 1621 he married Catharina Baeckx (1597–1640), with whom he had two daughters. On 22 November 1621 he graduated doctor of both laws in Leuven, and was appointed professor of law in 1628. In 1636 he also became the head of the university library. He twice served terms as rector of the university, in 1644 and 1649.

Andreas died in Leuven on 29 March 1655 and was buried in St. Peter's Church alongside his wife. A funeral elegy by Bernardus Heimbach, professor at the Collegium Trilingue, was printed in 1656 under the title Justa Valeriana seu Laudatio funebris.

== Publications ==
- Catalogus clarorum hispaniae scriptorum (Mainz, 1607).
- Imagines doctorum virorum e variis gentibus (Antwerp, 1611).
- De Initiis et progressu collegii trilinguis Buslidiani (1614).
- Dissertatio de toga et sago (Cologne, 1618).
- Bibliotheca Belgica in qua Belgica seu Germaniae inferioris provinciae urbesque, viri item in Belgio vita scriptisque clari et librorum nomenclatura (Leuven, 1623). Second edition Leuven, 1643.
- Fasti academici studii generalis lovaniensis (Leuven, 1635).
- Works at Lovanensia

A collection of his legal writings was published posthumously as Synopsis sive erothemata juris canonici (Cologne, 1660, 1672; Leuven 1680).
