= Jean-Noël Paquot =

Belgian theologian, historian, Hebrew scholar and bibliographer

Jean-Noël Paquot (1722–1803) was a theologian, historian, Hebrew scholar and bibliographer.

== Life ==
Paquot was born in Florennes in 1722. In 1738 he enrolled at the University of Louvain, graduating Licentiate of Theology in 1751. From 1755 to 1771 he taught Hebrew at the Collegium Trilingue in Leuven, where he was also librarian. He was stripped of his position after a sodomy trial. In subsequent years he lived in Brussels and Gembloux. In 1782 he was stripped of his pension as court historiographer to Empress Maria Theresa, for having denied that the Austrian government had a historical claim to Saint-Hubert.

On 1 February 1769 he was elected to the Société littéraire de Bruxelles, a precursor of the Royal Academy of Science, Letters and Fine Arts of Belgium.

In 1787 he moved to Liège to collaborate on an abortive project to found a university there. He died in Liège in 1803.

== Works ==
He wrote a book encompassing the entire literary history of the Low Countries, in all languages, entitled Mémoires pour servir à l'histoire littéraire des dix-sept provinces des Pays-Bas, de la principauté de Liège et de quelques contrées voisines ("Memoirs for the literary history of the seventeen provinces of the Netherlands, the Principality of Liege, and some neighboring countries"), Leuven, 1763-1770, 18 volumes in octavo or in three folio volumes, Leuven, 1765-1770.

He estimated that the polymath Juan Caramuel y Lobkowitz wrote no fewer than 262 works on different subjects.
