= Carolus Mulerius =

Dutch Hispanist and grammarian

Carolus Mulerius (21 February 1601, Harlingen – 13 August 1638, Groningen) was a Dutch Hispanist and grammarian.

He was the son of Christina Maria Six (1566-1645) and Nicolaus Mulerius (1564-1630), who is most famous as an astronomer, but at the time was physician of the city of Harlingen. His family moved to Groningen in 1603, to Leeuwarden in 1608, and back to Groningen in 1614, where his father became Professor of Medicine and Greek at the university. His elder brother Petrus Mulerius (1599-1647) became Professor of Physics and Botany at the same university.

Carolus studied at the University of Groningen (161) and University of Franeker (1618) and followed classes at several more universities in the Dutch Republic as well as abroad. He wrote Linguae Hispanicae Compendiosa Institutio (1630), Linguae Italicae Compendiosa Institutio (1631), Linguae Gallicae Compendiosa Institutio (1634), and Een korte ende seer dienstighe onderwijsinge Vande Spaensche Tale. The last work, published posthumously in 1648, was the first grammar of Spanish written in Dutch.

He died of edema at the age of 37. The tomb stone of his grave, originally in the Broerkerk in Groningen, at the time the church of the University of Groningen, is now kept in the cellars of the Academy Building of the university.
