= Janus Lernutius =

Latin poet from the Habsburg Netherlands

Jan Leernout, Latinized Janus Lernutius (1545–1619) was a Latin poet from the Spanish Netherlands (now Belgium).

== Life ==
Leernout was born to a wealthy family in Bruges on 15 November 1545. He was educated in Ghent and Antwerp, and then at the University of Leuven. Around 1565 he travelled to Paris, where he became friends with Janus Dousa and Lucas Fruytier. The three encouraged one another in writing poetry, particularly translating epigrams from book 7 of the Greek Anthology into Latin. Lernutius also composed praises of the kisses and the eyes of Hyella. In July and August 1568 he visited Dousa at his castle in Noordwijk, near Leiden. In April 1570 he was again in Leuven, where he became friends with Justus Lipsius. During the early stages of the Dutch Revolt he sought refuge in Besançon, then for several months at the University of Dole, being present, together with Lipsius, when their friend Victor Giselinus (Ghyselinck) graduated Doctor of Medicine. He wrote a farewell elegy when Giselinus returned to the Low Countries, then himself travelled to Italy. On 1 July 1572 he sent Dousa an elegy on the bitterness of exile from Pavia. He travelled around Italy, spending time at Rome, and returned to Pavia late in 1573. The following spring, he set off for the Low Countries.

On 17 October 1575, in the church of St Giles, Bruges, he married Marie Tortelboom, with whom he would have 12 children. In 1577 Lipsius visited him in Bruges before going to Leiden to take up his new post there; in the autumn of 1578 Lernutius and Giselinus went to visit Lipsius in Leiden. In 1577, Lernutius became an alderman on the city council, serving in various capacities until 1583.

In 1579 Christopher Plantin published Lernutius's first volume of poetry, Carmina, which included a cycle of 42 poems on Hyella's eyes, "Ocelli", in the manner of Catullus. On the strength of this volume, which was reckoned among the best Latin verse of the time, Rudolf II ennobled Lernutius in 1581. In September 1587, travelling to Lille, he was captured and held to ransom by soldiers from the English garrison in Ostend. Interventions by his friends secured him better treatment, but not his release. In 1590 he was transferred to England, where he was released in 1592. After his release he broke an arm in a fall from a horse.

He returned to city government in 1599, and served six terms as alderman in the years 1609–1616.

In 1606, he completed a volume of victory odes on the successes of Ambrogio Spinola in the Siege of Ostend, Siege of Lingen, Siege of Groenlo, and elsewhere. This was published in 1607 by Hieronymus Verdussen. Another volume of love poetry, Basia, appeared in 1614, published in Leiden by Lodewijk Elzevir. In Bruges, he founded literary and poetic circles with his friend Anselmus Beoetius de Boodt (1550-1632). Lernutius died in Bruges on 29 September 1619, and was buried in the Church of St Salvator.

His only surviving prose work, a study of Charles the Good probably written before 1604, was prepared for posthumous publication by his son.

== Works ==
- Carmina (Antwerp, Plantin Press, 1579)
- Encomiastica ordinibus Mandria universim et singillatim consecrata (Bruges, P. Soutaert, 1604)
- Epinicia honori et virtuti ducis Ambros. Spinulae dicata (Antwerp, Hieronymus Verdussen, 1607)
- Epicedia, sive funus Lipsianum immortalitati sacr. (Antwerp, Hieronymus Verdussen, 1607)
- Idyllia Filio Dei et magnae Matri Virgini sacra (Leuven, Sassius, 1612)
- Initia, basia, ocelli et alia poemata ab ipso auctore publicata (Leiden, Lodewijk Elzevir, 1614)
- De natura et cultu Karoli I, comitis Flandriae (Bruges, Guillaume de Neve, 1621)
