= Cruquianus =

Cruquianus or Commentator Cruquianus was an anonymous writer of ancient Rome known primarily as a scholiast on the Roman lyric poet Horace.

== Works ==
The true name of this writer is not known. He is identified as "Commentator Cruquianus" because his annotations were brought forth in an edition of Horace assembled by 16th-century Flemish scholar Jacob Cruucke— who used the Latin pen name "Jacobus Cruquius"—from four manuscripts of Horace in the library of the monastery of St. Peter's Abbey, Ghent, or "Mont Blandin". These were the so-called "Blandinian manuscripts". All four manuscripts were later destroyed in a fire at the monastery in 1566, leaving Cruquius's edition the sole surviving record of this commentator.

Cruquius published several separate volumes, and then one complete edition in 1578. He attributed to a single "Commentator Cruquianus" the anonymous annotations that he believed too good to be those of the other Horace scholiasts, Pomponius Porphyrion and Helenius Acron, about whom Cruquius had a very low opinion. After Cruquius's death these commentaries were published as a separate, standalone work, in 1611.

The editions of Cruquius contain material that scholars consider unequivocally ancient, so it is believed Commentator Cruquianus significantly predates the 16th century.

== Debate ==
Some scholars believe "Commentator Cruquianus" to be many scholiasts, not a single source. The value of the annotations themselves are debated as well; some critics rate them highly, while some believe that the scholiasts (Commentator Cruquianus among them) preserve little that isn't already present in the common manuscripts of Horace, and what they do preserve has been described as "fanciful guess-work" and "worthless", though some take a more sanguine view that the Commentator Cruquianus's works are useful if taken with "great reserve and caution".
