= Mengeringhausen =

Coordinates: 51°22′00″N 8°59′24″E

Coat of arms of Mengeringhausen

Mengeringhausen is a village and a municipal district of Bad Arolsen in Waldeck-Frankenberg, in Hesse, Germany. Its population is estimated to be 3,800 people. It was first mentioned as the town 'Stadt Mengeringhausen' in 1234. The town was in possession of sovereign principality Waldeck (later Waldeck and Pyrmont).

In 1974, Mengeringhausen was incorporated to the city Bad Arolsen.

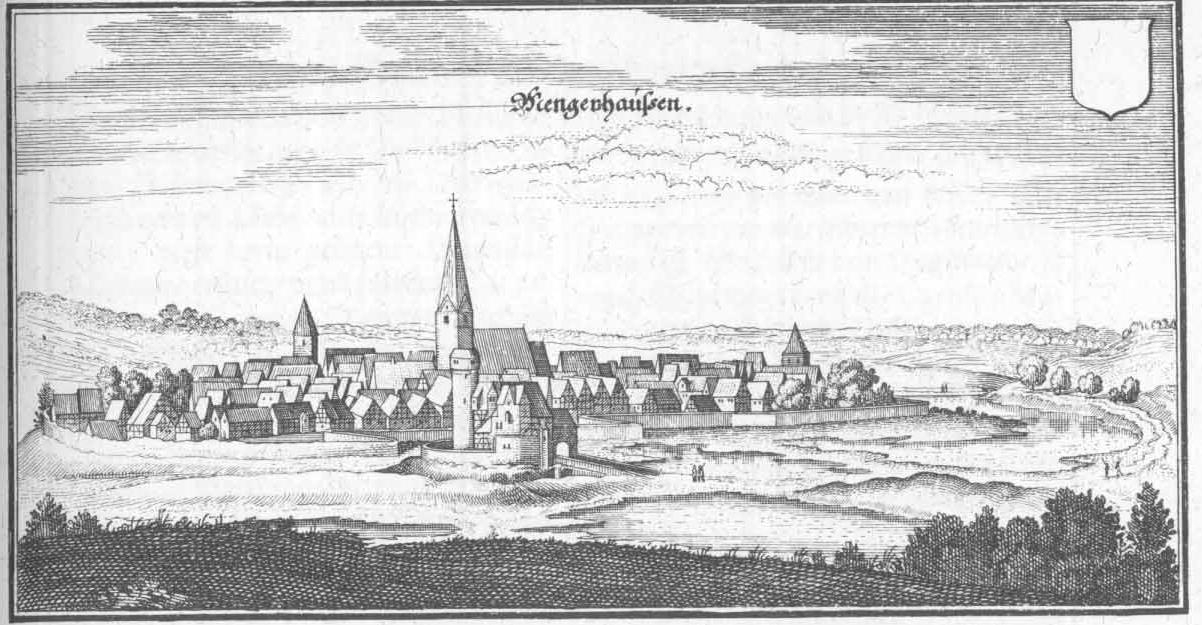
Mengeringhausen in 1655

== Notable people ==
- Conrad Goclenius (1490-1539), Renaissance humanist and friend of Desiderius Erasmus.
- Philipp Nicolai (1556–1608), Lutheran pastor, poet, and composer.
- Ernst Friedrich von Ockel, 18th century theologian.
- Wilhelm von Le Suire (1787–1852), the Bavarian Lieutenant General and War Minister.
- Carl Theodor Severin (1763–1836), architect active in Mecklenburg.
