= Andreas Schott =

Flemish philologist and Jesuit priest

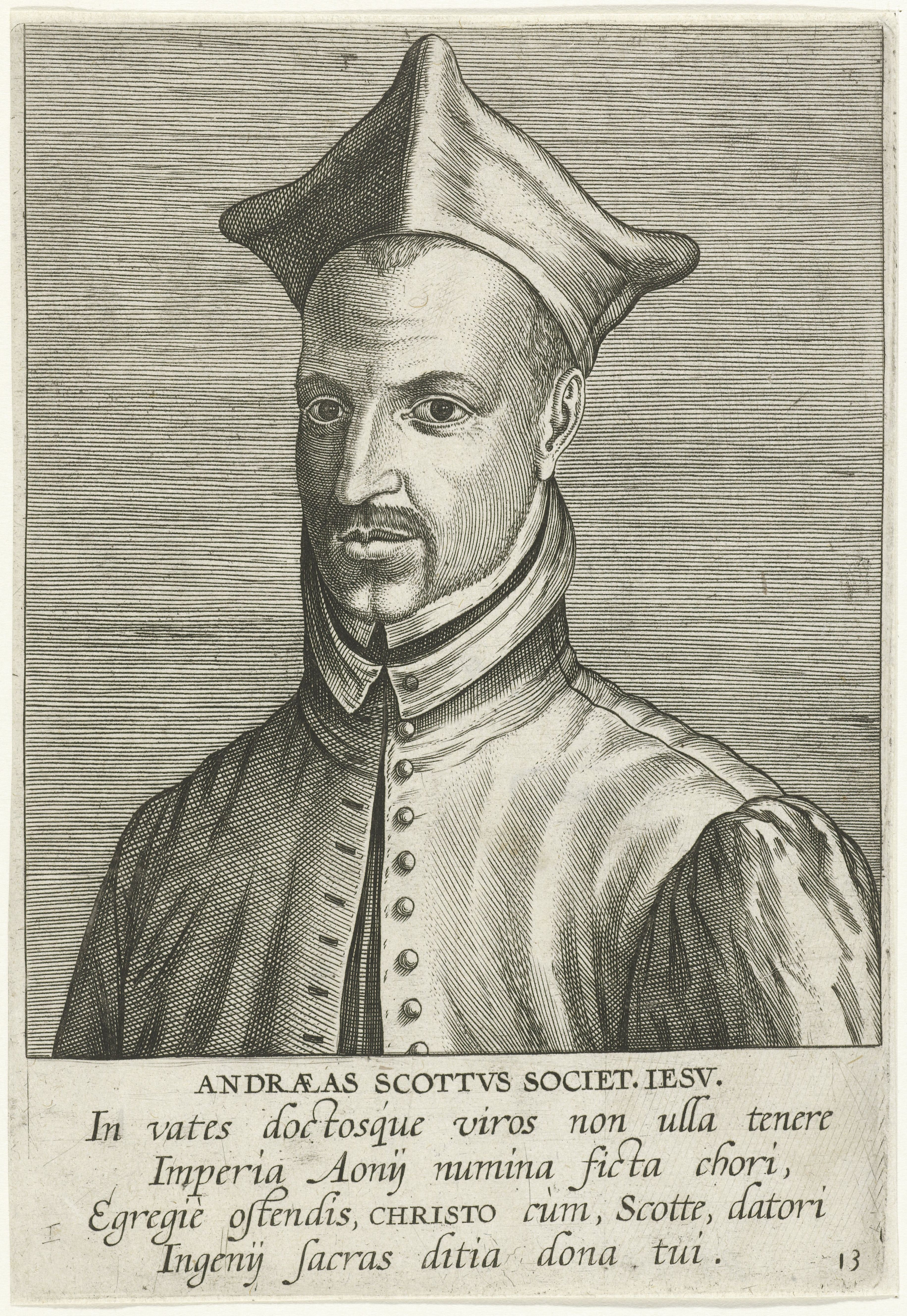
- Born: 12 September 1552; Antwerp, Spanish Netherlands
- Died: 23 January 1629 (aged 76); Antwerp, Spanish Netherlands

Academic background
- Education: Collegium Trilingue

Academic work
- Discipline: philology
- Institutions: Colegio de Santa Catalina; University of Zaragoza
- Notable works: translations of classical literature

Andreas Schott SJ (latinised as Andreas Schottus and Andreas Scottus; 12 September 1552 – 23 January 1629) was an academic, linguist, translator, editor and a Jesuit priest from Antwerp in the Habsburg Netherlands. He was mainly known for his editions of Latin and Greek classical literature.

== Life ==
Schott was born in Antwerp as the son of Franciscus Schott and Anna Bosschaert. He had a brother, also called Franciscus, who became a legal scholar, served as mayor and alderman of Antwerp and authored an Italian travel guide. Andreas studied philosophy at the Leuven University's Collegium Trilingue, a college where Latin, Greek and Hebrew were taught. His teachers included Cornelius Valerius for Latin, and Theodoricus Langius for Greek. He graduated in 1573, placing 61st in his year, and began teaching rhetoric at the undergraduate college Paedagogium Castri (Castle College) while undertaking further studies in theology under Michael Baius. One of his students was Peter Pantin (Petrus Pantinus) (1556–1611), who became a longtime companion and lifelong friend.

In 1576, with university life disrupted by the Dutch Revolt, Schott and Pantin went to Douai, where Schott spent a year as tutor in the household of Philippe de Lannoy, Seigneur de Tourcoing. Subsequently they left for Paris, where in 1577 Ogier Ghiselin de Busbecq took them into his house. Towards the end of the 1579, Schott and Pantin travelled to Spain, spending Christmas in Toledo with William Damasus Lindanus, bishop of Roermond. In 1580, through the patronage of Antonio de Covarrubias, Schott succeeded Álvar Gómez de Castro as professor of Greek at the Colegio de Santa Catalina in Toledo. In Toledo he became acquainted with Antonius Augustinus, a Spanish humanist historian and jurist, who pioneered the historical research of the sources of canon law. Schott remained in the city for three years as professor of Greek, after brief stays in Salamanca and Saragossa. He lived in the household of the archbishop of Toledo, Gaspar de Quiroga y Vela. He also visited Augustinus, who had become archbishop of Tarragona. He was attracted by his great erudition and his rich manuscript collection. When the archbishop died in 1586, Schott published a eulogy at the Plantin Press in Antwerp which he dedicated to his Flemish compatriot Laevinus Torrentius. Schott assisted Torrentius in obtaining some of the writings of Augustinus.

In 1583 Schott resigned his position in Toledo in favour of Pantin, and travelled to Salamanca, before teaching at the University of Zaragoza. On 30 September 1584 he was ordained to the priesthood, and at Easter 1586 he was admitted to the Society of Jesus. From 1587 to 1592 he studied theology in Valencia. He left Spain in 1594, after 15 years on the peninsula. He then spent three years in Italy, teaching Greek in Rome and studying many hours in the Vatican Library. In 1597 he returned to his native Antwerp after an absence of over 20 years. He arrived there on 30 September 1597 after travelling through Munich, Augsburg and Cologne. He spent the next 30 years teaching and writing at the Jesuit college in the city, where his students included Valerius Andreas and Gaspar Gevartius.

Schott died in Antwerp on 23 January 1629, after suffering ten days of intestinal inflammation.

As a scholar, he corresponded with Abraham Ortelius, Justus Lipsius, Joseph Justus Scaliger, Isaac Casaubon, and Hugo Grotius, among many others. Federigo Borromeo thanked Schott for his work with two silver reliquaries containing fragments of clothing worn by Carlo Borromeo.

== Editions by Schott ==
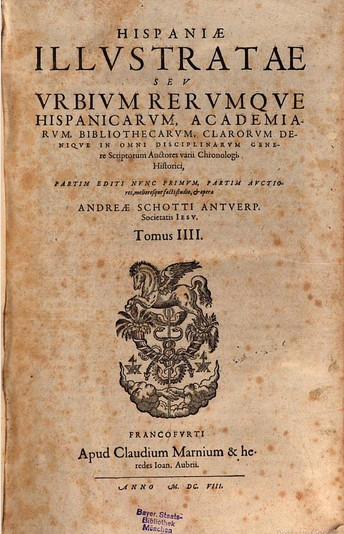
Hispania illustrata, 4th volume, 1608

- De viris illvstribvs vrbis Romæ liber falsò hactenus Corn. Nepoti, vel C. Plinio Caecilio inscriptus by Aurelius Victor (1577)
- Origo gentis romanae, (1579) manuscript from Theodore Poelmann, printed with De Viris illustribus Urbis Romae, De Caesaribus, De Vita et Mortis Imperatorum Romanorum
- De situ orbis spicelegio auctus of Pomponius Mela (Antwerp 1582)
- Tabulae rei nummariae Romanorum Graecorumque (1605)
- L. Annaei Senecae philosophi et M. Annaei Senecae rhetoris qvae extant opera by Seneca the rhetorician (1607)
- Commentarius in Aemilium Probum (1609) commentary on Aemilius Probus
- Photii bibliotheca graeco-latina (1611)
- Adagia sive Proverbia Graecorvm by Diogenianus (1612)
- Observationvm hvmanorvm lib. V. quibus Græci Latiniq[ue] scriptores, philologi, poetæ, historici, oratores & philosophi emendatur by Proclus Diadochus (1615)
- In Ciceronem Annotationes: Quibus lectiora eiusdem carmina accedunt of Carolus Langus (Carl Lange)
- Antonini Augusti Provinciarum

== Publications by Schott ==
- Laudatio funebris V. Cl. Ant. Augustini, archiepiscopi Tarraconensis, Ex officina Plantiniana, 1586
- Hispania illustrata 1604
- Annotationum Spicilegium
- Adagia sive Proverbia Graecorum Antwerp, 1612
- Adagia sacra Novi Testamenti 1612
- Observationum Humanarum libri V Hanoviae, 1615
