= Johannes Campensis =

Dutch Christian Hebraist

Jan Van Campen, Latinized Johannes Campensis (c. 1490–1538) was a Christian Hebraist from the Habsburg Netherlands who taught Hebrew in Leuven and Kraków.

== Life ==
Campensis was born at Kampen, Overijssel around 1490. He may have learned Hebrew from Johann Reuchlin, and from 1520 to 1531 taught the language at the Collegium Trilingue attached to the University of Leuven. In 1528 he published a work on Hebrew grammar with Dirk Martens, based on the writings of Elias Levita, which went through several editions. At Nuremberg in 1532 he published a paraphrase of the Psalms based on the Hebrew text, and his paraphrase of Ecclesiastes was published in Paris the same year.

After 1531 he travelled through Germany and Poland to consult rabbis and other experts. For a while he taught at Kraków on the invitation of Prince-Bishop Piotr Tomicki. He also spent two years in Venice and visited Rome. On his return journey to the Low Countries he contracted the plague, dying at Freiburg im Breisgau on 7 September 1538.

== Publications ==
- Ex variis libellis Eliae grammaticorum omnium doctissimi, huc fere congestum est opéra Johannis Campensis, quidquid ad absolutam grammaticam hebràicam est necessarium (Leuven, 1528; Kraków, 1534; Paris, 1539, 1543).
