= Ernst Friedrich von Ockel =

Baltic German theologian

Ernst Friedrich Ockel (then von Ockel zu Salwitz) was Lutheran theologian, writer and politician from the duchy of Courland (Latvia), born 16 November 1742, in Mengeringhausen (Waldeck).

Son of a Lutheran minister and school rector in Mengeringhausen, studied in the Halle University.

Returning to Waldeck as an education specialist, he was entrusted by princess Carlotta-Sophia with the education of her son Ludwig.

Appointed in 1767 as Master of court of the duchy of Courland, he was made prior of the Kandava diocese (1780), then became main preacher of Mitau (in the Trinity Church) and superintendent of the duchy (1785). After graduating (1792) from Greifswald University as a doctor in theology, he chaired the Consistory of Courland as from 1806.

He died in Mitau (22 March 1816).

== Main works ==
A prolific writer, he is considered as one of main figures of the 18th century Lutheran reformers, along with his beloved master, Dr Wilhelm Abraham Teller.

- Der Mentor oder die Bildung des Verstandes, Herzens und Geschmacks: nach Grundsätzen und Erfahrung vornehmlich zur Privaterziehung der Jugend vom Stande entworfen von E. F. O, Riga, 1770
- Betrachtungen über die Wünsche der Menschen, Mitau, 1771
- Ueber die Sittlichkeit der Wollust, Mietau et Leipzig, 1772 (Text)
- Standrede bey dem Sarge des Freyherrn Karl Philipp von Rönne, Erbherrn der Puhrenschen und mehrerer Güter, Riga, 1778
- Ueber die drey Erzieher des Plutarch, Natur, Gewohnheit und Unterricht, (Mitauische Monatsschrift) Mai 1784, S.127-73
- Ueber die Größe der Welt, in Mitauische Monatsschrift, February 1785, S.91–118
- Ueber Geist und Wahrheit der Religion Jesu: Ein Beytrag zur Beförderung des thätigen Christenthums und des wahren Duldungs-Sinnes, Berlin et Stettin, 1785 (réédité à Prague en 1786)
- [Verf.: Ernst Friedrich Ockel]: Rede bey der feyerlichen Einführung als Superintendent in der Dreyeinigkeitskirche zu Mitau gehalten, Mitau, 1786
- Antrittspredigt von der beseligenden Gotteskraft der Religion Jesu über Joh. VI, 66–67 (in der Dreyeinigkeitskirche zu Mitau), 1786
- Auch ein Wort zu seiner Zeit, in einem Schreiben an das Hoch- und Wohlehrwürdige Ministerium dieser Herzogthümer, wie auch an alle Christen, Denker und Zweifler, Mitau, 1786
- Ob und wie fern die Kanzel der schickliche Ort zur Aufklärung sey: Eine nöthige Pastoralfrage, Berlin, 1789
- Ueber die wahre und falsche Aufklärung, eine Predigt über Röm. XIII, 11–14 (in der Trinitätskirche zu Mitau gehalten), Mitau, 1790
- Veränderte alte Kirchengebete der kurländischen Agende, Mitau, 1790
- Ueber die Religion der Vollkommnern Anmerkungen und Zusätze zu der Schrift des Herrn Oberconsistorial-Raths Doctor Teller, Berlin, 1794 (Text)
- Anleitung zur Weisheit, Tugend und Glückseligkeit für die Jugend nach der reinen Lehre Jesu, Königsberg, 1795 (réédité à Mitau en 1813)
- Palingenesie des Menschen nach Vernunft und Schrift: oder dargestellte Uebereinstimmung dessen, was beide über Unsterblichkeit, Auferstehung und den künftigen Lebenszustand lehren, Königsberg and Mitau, 1795 (Text)
- Opfer innigster Liebe und Verehrung geweihet dem vollendeten Geiste des Herrn Starosten u.s.w. S.F. Korff. Erbherrn der Güter Nerft, Schönberg, Brücken u.s.w., Mitau, 1797
- Ein Wort zu dieser Zeit. In einem Hirtenbriefe an das geistliche Ministerium des kurländischen Gouvernements, Mitau, 1807
- Todtenopfer geweihet dem vollendeten Geiste des Herrn G. J. v. Bolschwing, Oberhauptmann zu Mitau, Mitau 1808
