= Conrad Goclenius =

Renaissance humanist

- Born: 1490; Mengeringhausen
- Died: 1539 (aged 48–49); Leuven
- Occupations: Humanist, Teacher

Conrad Goclenius (or in German "Conrad Wackers" or "Conrad Gockelen") was a Renaissance humanist, and Latin scholar, and the closest confidant of humanist Desiderius Erasmus, who was born in Mengeringhausen in the Landgraviate of Hesse in 1490, and died in Leuven on 25 January 1539.

== Life ==
Little is known of his youth, except that as a child he attended the school of humanist Alexander Hegius von Heek in Deventer. In November 1510 he enrolled at the University of Cologne, and later moved on to Old University of Leuven. He became Master of Arts on 10 November 1515, and then supported himself by private teaching. In 1518 he was ordained to an ecclesiastical benefice. In October 1519, he succeeded Adrianus Barlandus as Latin teacher at the Collegium Trilingue, where he taught Jacob Cruucke and Andreas Masius who would later become notable humanists in their own right. He kept this chair until his death in 1539, after which he was succeeded by Petrus Nannius. As a Latin scholar, he was responsible for educating an entire generation of excellent Latin scholars.

Although originally he did not support his candidacy, Erasmus quickly became fond of Goclenius. He praised his mastery of classical languages and teaching in many of his letters (including one to Thomas More). When Erasmus moved to Basel in autumn 1521, Goclenius became his agent and trusted man in Leuven and the Low Countries. Erasmus had originally intended to quickly return to Leuven, though he never did.

This is Goclenius to whom Erasmus told his autobiography (Compendium vitae) in 1524. He also authorized him to conduct a general edition of his works. In May 1519, Goclenius had composed a metrical version of the catalog of the works of the great writer, lucubrationum Erasmicarum elenchus. When Erasmus believed himself close to death, it was to Goclenius that he entrusted his will, in which he entrusted a considerable sum to Goclenius.

In April 1525 he was appointed canon of the Cathedral of Our Lady in Antwerp (through jus nominationis granted by Pope Leo X in the liberal arts faculty of Leuven), but the nomination was contested, and a very long trial followed. In 1534, with his friend the Polish diplomat and humanist Johannes Dantiscus, he was appointed provost of the cathedral chapter of Hoegaarden. In July 1536, he assumed provisional leadership of the Collegium Trilingual after the death of its chairman Joost van der Hoeven.

Goclenius enjoyed considerable reputation in his time: in his lifetime he was proposed to succeed Juan Luis Vives at Corpus Christi College, Oxford, but ultimately remained in Leuven until his death. From his pulpit and in the Latin literature of the Collegium Trilingue, he had a great influence on the humanistic culture of the sixteenth century. Portuguese father of archaeology André de Resende dedicated his Encomium urbis et academiæ Lovaniensis (1530) to Goclenius.

== Death ==
Goclenius died of bronchitis, and his successor Petrus Nannius delivered his eulogy (Funebris oratio habita pro mortuo Conrado Goclenio). The inscription of his tomb in St. Peter's Church, Leuven, reads "the other Erasmus".

== Works ==
He wrote a Latin version of the Hermotimus, sive De sectis philosophorum of Lucian, dedicated to Thomas More (Louvain, D. Martens, 1522), for which More gave him a gilded cup full of gold pieces. Then he jointly wrote, with Erasmus, an edition of philosophical dialogues of Cicero: M. Tullii Ciceronis Officiorum libri III. De amicitia. De senectute. Paradoxa. Somnium Scipionis. De senectute & Somnium Scipionis etiam Theodori Gazæ versione. Omnia denuo vigilantiori cura recognita per Des. Erasmum Rot. & Conradum Goclenium, deprehensis ac restitutis aliquot locis non cuilibet obviis (Bâle, J. Froben, 1528). He also published an edition of the Pharsalia of Lucian (Anvers, M. Hillen, 1531).

== Bibliography ==
- Roland Crahay, Recherches sur le Compendium vitæ attribué à Érasme, Humanisme et Renaissance 6, 1939, p. 7-19 et 135–153.
- Friedrich Meuser, Conrad Goclenius aus Mengeringhausen (1489-1539), Geschichtsblätter für Waldeck 60, 1968, p. 10-23.
- Godelieve Tournoy-Thoen, article Conradus Goclenius, in Peter Gerard Bietenholz et Thomas Brian Deutscher (dir.), Contemporaries of Erasmus : A Biographical Register of the Renaissance and Reformation, University of Toronto Press, 1986.
