= Robert Wakefield =

English linguist and scholar

Robert Wakefield (ca. 1493/5-1537) was an English linguist and scholar.

== Life ==
He studied at the University of Cambridge, graduating B.A. in 1513-1514. He was awarded an M.A. at the University of Leuven in 1519; while in the Low Countries he taught Hebrew at Jeroen van Busleyden's Collegium Trilingue in Leuven. John Fisher was his patron, and in 1519 he also became Fellow of St John's College, Cambridge. He was at the University of Tübingen in 1522, teaching as the successor of Johannes Reuchlin.

He taught Hebrew at Cambridge from 1524 and received the B.D. there the following year. Richard Pace recommended the subject to the king and he was appointed a royal chaplain. His Oratio de utilitate trium linguarum (1524), the printed version by Wynkyn de Worde of his inaugural lecture, contained the first examples of Hebrew text, and Arabic, published in England. From 1530 he taught in Oxford and is rumored to have stolen the ancient Hebrew lexicon from the abbey library at Ramsey.

He wrote in favour of Henry VIII's divorce, after being persuaded by Richard Pace to drop his support for Catherine of Aragon; in 1528 he issued a work putting the king’s case, and showing by its dedication that he now had Thomas Boleyn as patron. He became a canon of Christ Church, Oxford, in 1532.

== Works ==
- Robert Wakefield: On the Three Languages, 1524 (1989) edited and translated by G. Lloyd Jones from the Oratio de laudibus et utilitate trium linguarum
