= Petrus Nannius =

Dutch poet

- Pieter Nanninck
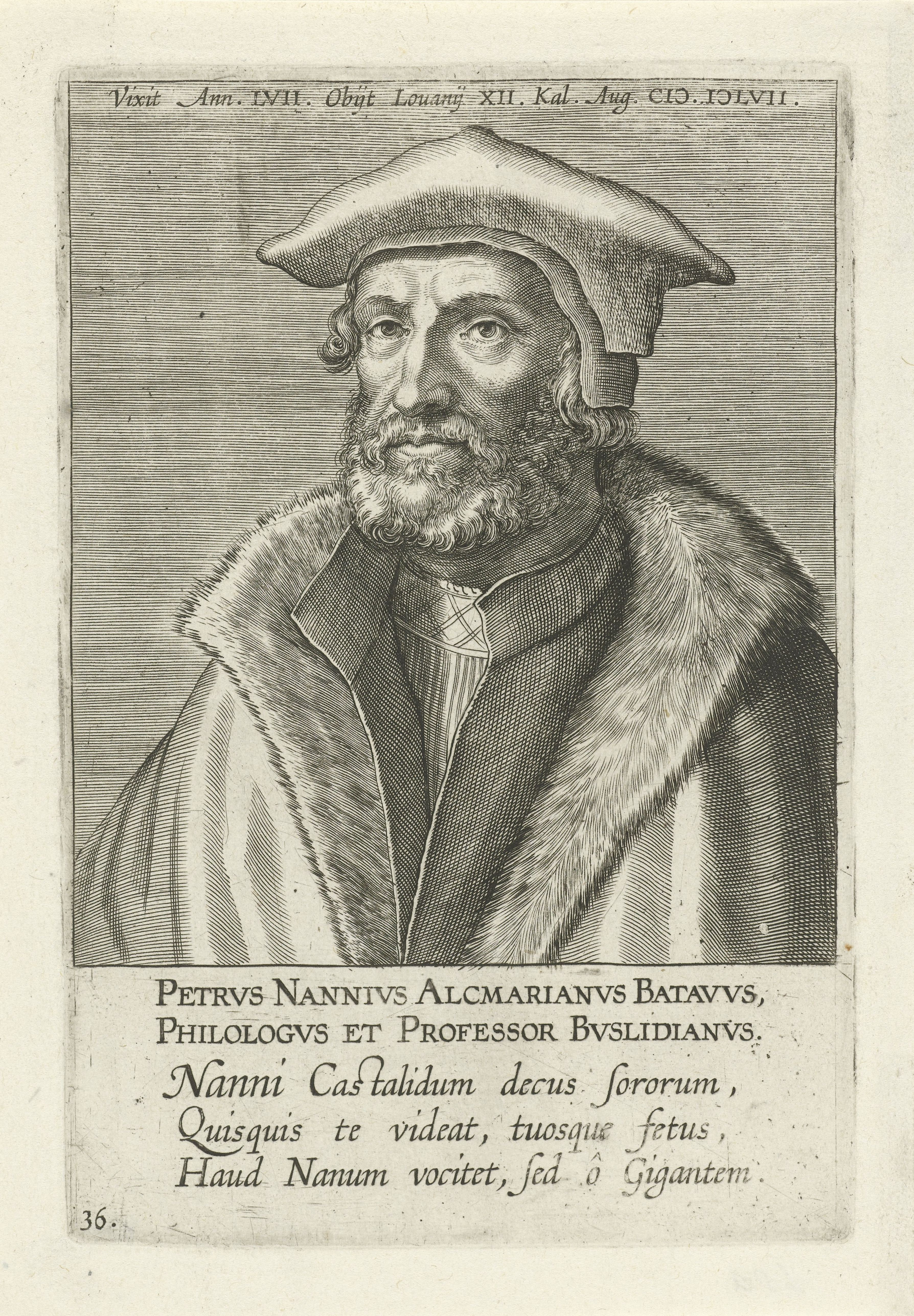
- Pieter Nanninck by Philip Galle
- Born: 1496; Alkmaar
- Died: 1557 (aged 60–61); Leuven
- Occupations: Humanist, Teacher
- Title: Rector of the Collegium Trilingue
- Predecessor: Conrad Goclenius
- Successor: Cornelius Valerius

Petrus Nannius (Dutch: Pieter Nanninck; b. 1496, Alkmaar – d. 1557) was a Dutch poet, accomplished Latin scholar and humanist of the 16th century. A contemporary of Desiderius Erasmus, he was born in Alkmaar and was an important figure in the humanism of the time, having provided a foundation with his teaching for the later flowering of humanism in the region.

== Life ==
We first hear of Nannius teaching in Gouda, South Holland. His appointment here is considered a turning point in the humanism of Gouda, in that the humanistic spirit was being found less inside monasteries, and more in public, secular life. In 1539, Nannius succeeded Conrad Goclenius as Latin teacher at the Collegium Trilingue, where he taught renowned intellectuals of the age such as Jacobus Cruquius. Nannius was described by Flemish humanist Justus Lipsius as the first person to introduce a love of letters in the Collegium Trilingue. Nannius served in this capacity from 1539 to his death in 1557. For his many scholarly endeavours, he could rely on the financial help of influential patrons, such as Antoine Perrenot de Granvelle.

== Works ==
Nannius was also a writer who wrote a commentary on the Ars Poetica of Horace, and saw in it many similarities to Menippean satire. He translated the works of many Greek authors, including Aeschines, Plutarch, and Athanasius. He also produced ten books of critical and explanatory Miscellanea, and commentaries on the Eclogues and fourth book of the Aeneid by Virgil.

=== Selective bibliography ===
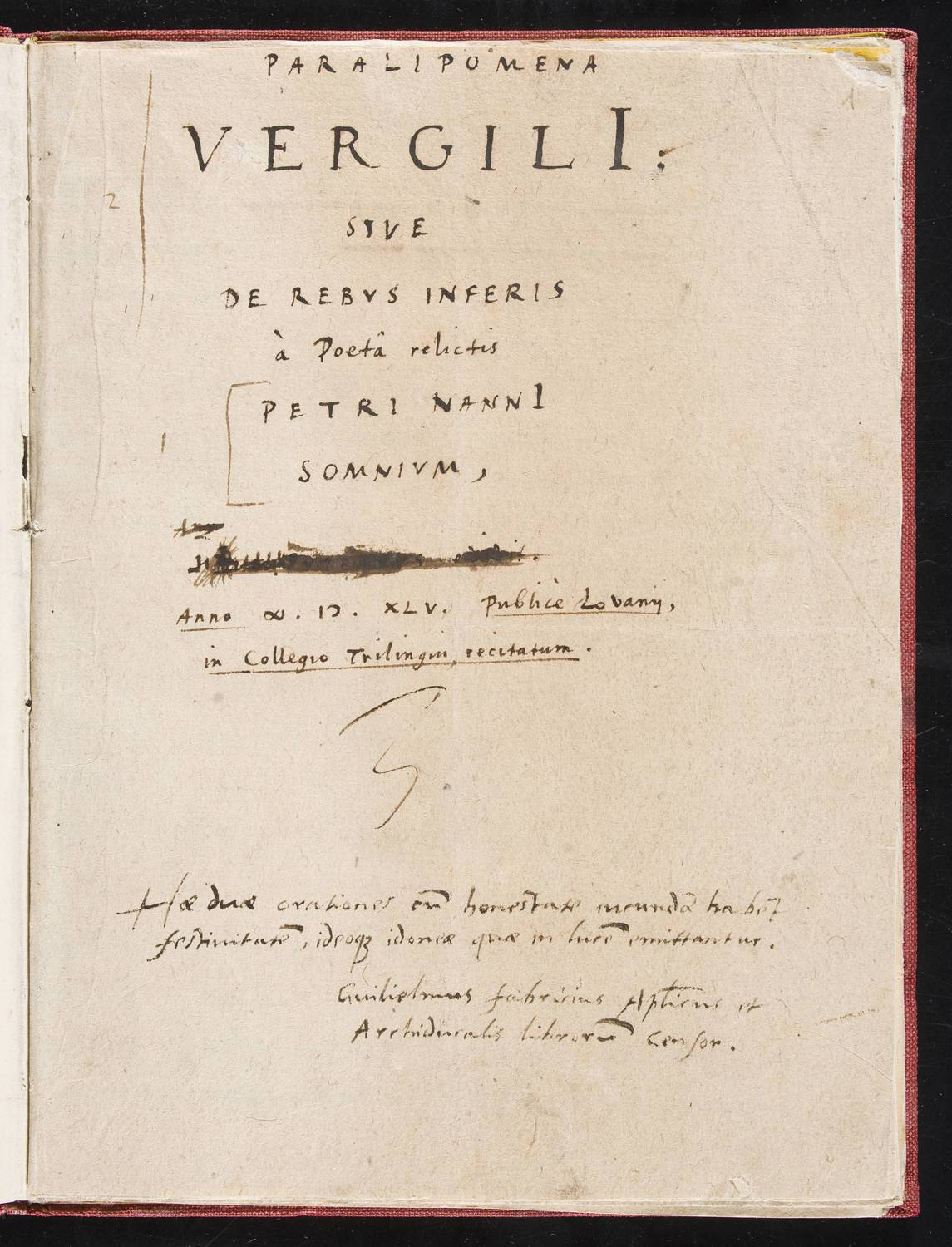
Image of the title page of Paralipomena Vergili sive De rebus inferis a poeta relictis (1545), a contemporary apograph of Nannius' Somnium or Dream Oration, held on the occasion of his course on the sixth book of Vegil's Aeneid. The first printed edition appeared in 1611. The manuscript apograph is kept at KU Leuven Libraries and is completely digitized.

Philological Commentaries

- Vergil: Aeneis IV (1544), Bucolica (1559, published posthumously)
- Livy: Ab Urbe condita III (1545)
- Cicero: In Verrem (1546)
- Σύμμικτα or Miscellanea (1548)
- "Symmachi, & Ambrosii de Religione Epistolæ adversariæ, Petri Nannii Alcmariani, et Victoris Giselini scholiis illvstratæ". Aurelii Prudentii Clementis Opera. Antverpiae: Plantin. 1564.
- Horace: Ars poetica (1608, published posthumously)

Latin translations of Greek texts

- Lucian: 7 Dialogues of the Gods and 4 Dialogues of the Sea Gods (1528)
- Basil of Caesarea: several homilies (Leuven, 1538 and 1539). The 1538 edition is available on KU Leuven Special Collections.
- Plutarch: Lives of Phocion and Cato the Younger (1540)
- Athenagoras: On the Resurrection of the Dead (1541, editio princeps)
- Athanasius: Complete works (1556)

Original literary output

- Vinctus (1522)
- Declamatio de Bello Turcis Inferendo (1535/6)
- Orationes tres (1541)
- Dialogismi heroinarum (1541 and 1550)
- Declamatio quodlibetica, de aeternitate mundi (1549)
- Dream orations (1611, published posthumously)
  - Somnium, sive Paralipomena Virgilii: Res Inferae a Poeta relictae
  - Somnium alterum In lib. Il Lucretii Praefatio
