= Farrago =

Farrago is a Latin word, meaning 'mixed cattle fodder', used to refer to a confused variety of miscellaneous things. As a name, it may refer to:

- Farrago (plant), a genus of plants in the family Poaceae
- Farrago (magazine), student newspaper at the University of Melbourne
- Farrago, Hornsea, historic house in the East Riding of Yorkshire, in England
- Farrago rerum theologicarum, a book by Wessel Gansfort
- The Four Men: A Farrago, a 1911 novel by Hilaire Belloc
- Ronnie Scott's Jazz Farrago
