= Franciscus Dousa =

Dutch classical scholar (1577-1630)

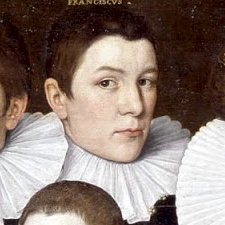
Frans van der Does.jpg

Franciscus Dousa (Latinized from Frans van der Does; 5 March 1577 in Leiden – 11 December 1630 in Leiden) was a Dutch classical scholar at Leiden University. He was a younger son of Janus Dousa, a pupil of Justus Lipsius, and a friend of Joseph Justus Scaliger.

He edited the editio princeps of Gaius Lucilius' Satyrarum quae supersunt reliquiae (1597, title page).
