= Jacobus Latomus =

Belgian theologian (1475–1544)

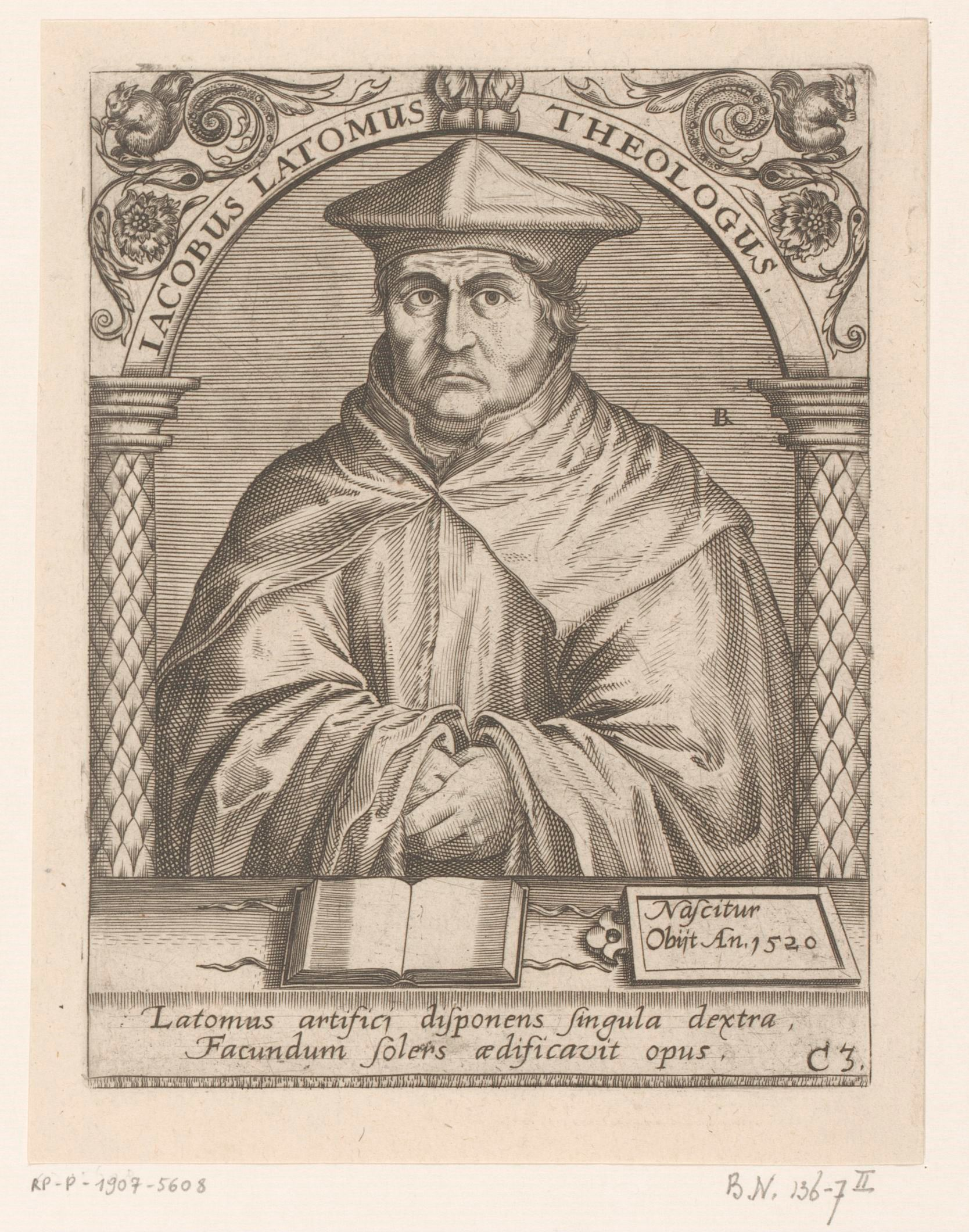
- Jacobus Latomus from Boissard's Bibliotheca chalcographica (1669)
- Born: c. 1475; Cambron, present-day France
- Died: 29 May 1544 (aged 68–69); Leuven, Flanders
- Scientific career
- Workplaces: Old University of Leuven

Jacobus Latomus (or Jacques Masson) (c. 1475 – 29 May 1544) was a Catholic Flemish theologian, a distinguished member of the Faculty of Theology at the University of Leuven. Latomus was a theological adviser to the Inquisition, and his exchange with William Tyndale is particularly noted. The general focus of his academic work centered on opposing Martin Luther and the Protestant Reformation, supporting the papacy and the hierarchy of the Catholic Church. Etymology: Latinized Latomus = Masson from Greek lā-tómos 'stone-cutter, quarryman', thus 'mason'.

== Academic career ==
Latomus completed his studies in Paris at the Collège de Montaigu, where he obtained a doctorate in theology in 1519. In the same year, he began teaching theology in Leuven, becoming a full professor in 1535. Having risen to the post of dean of the Faculty of Theology, he became rector of the University of Leuven in 1537.

His first work was published in 1519, a criticism of Biblical language studies at the Collegium Trilingue in Leuven, as well as work against Desiderius Erasmus, which initiated a long-standing literary dispute between Erasmus and Latomus. Other writings included criticism of Martin Luther, a defense of the theologians of Leuven, and arguments against Johannes Oecolampadius and Philipp Melanchthon.

=== Deportment ===
Nicholas Crane has described Latomus as a "tiny, chilling, man with thin lips, dark, bagged eyes and a limp". Erasmus referred facetiously to his opponent's limp, assigning him the epithet "Hephestion", a reference to the crippled metal-smith of Greek mythology.

Latomus was a canon of St. Peter's Church, Leuven and was a prominent voice against Erasmus for twenty years. He was also an experienced inquisitor; indeed, he has been labeled "the greatest heresy-hunter in Europe" among his contemporaries. Despite his fearsome academic reputation, his responses to William Tyndale were both precise and courteous.

=== Refutations of Tyndale ===
While in prison for charges relating to his translation of the Bible into English, William Tyndale was questioned by Latomus, whose task was to determine that Tyndale's views were heretical and that he would not abandon them. It is possible that Tyndale's charge of heresy was determined long before the exchange, and that the sole goal of Latomus's examination was to bring Tyndale back to orthodoxy before he was burned at the stake.

Tyndale set out his views in writing, and Latomus answered them; Tyndale in turn produced a book in two parts as a reply, a work which is now lost. At Tyndale's request, Latomus countered the two parts of this book in two different writings. Latomus's replies, along with his first letter, were collected by his nephew into a work called Refutations against Tyndale (1550), which included an introduction by Livinus Crucius, the parish priest of the Flemish village of Boeschepe. Latomus allegedly intended these works to edify, not as a solely personal academic exchange.

Latomus's works are important, as they have allowed a credible reconstruction of the Catholic response to Tyndale's views; it is also apparent that Latomus either did not know of Tyndale's translation of the Bible or did not think it worth mentioning—evincing that the precise charge brought against Tyndale at the time was not translating the Bible, but the so-called heresy of Lutheranism.

== Bibliography ==
Jacobus is not to be confused with Bartholomaeus Latomus (Mason), a contemporary Catholic humanist Latinist associated with Tier, Freiburg, Cologne, and Paris who studied at the Collegium Trilingue in Louvain in 1530/31, a friend of Erasmus who also wrote some counter-Protestant books to counter Martin Bucer.

- De trium linguarum et studii theologici ratione dialogus (Antwerp, 1519)
  A criticism of the Collegium Trilingue, founded in Louvain by Hieronymus van Busleyden, inspired by Erasmus.
- Articulorum doctrinae fratris M. Lutheri per theologos Lovanienses damnatorum ratio ex sacris literis et veteribus tractatoribus (Antwerp, 1521)
  A defense of the theologians of Louvain against Melanchthon and the Lutherans.
- De primatus pontificis adversus Lutherum (1525)
  A response to Luther's reply to Articulorum doctrinae fratris M. Lutheri...
- De confessione secreta (Antwerp, Michael Hillenius Hoochstratanus, 1525), available at KU Leuven Special Collections.
  An attack on Johannes Oecolampadius and Beatus Rhenanus.
- De ecclesia et hvmanae legis obligatione (Antwerpen, Michael Hillenius Hoochstratanus, 1529) available at KU Leuven Special Collections
- Confutationum adversus Guililmum Tindalum (1542)
  Refutations of William Tyndale.
- Duae epistolae, una in libellum de ecclesia, Philippo Melanchthoni adscripta; altera contra orationem factiosorum in comitiis Ratisbonensibus habitam (Antwerp, 1544)
  A treatise on doctrinal problems.
- Opera omnia (Louvain, 1550)
  His complete works.

== Legacy ==
- The academic journal Latomus: revue d'études latines is published at Brussels. It is supplemented by a series of monographs called Collection Latomus.
- One of the four main lecture halls of the University of Luxembourg's campus in Walferdange is named "Latomus" (the others being Montessori, Piaget and Vygotsky).

== Works cited ==
- Crane, Nicholas (2003). Mercator: The Man Who Mapped the Planet. Macmillan. ISBN 0-8050-6624-1.
- Daniell, David (2003). The Bible in English: Its History and Influence. Yale University Press. ISBN 0-300-09930-4.
- Juhász, Gergely; Paul Arblaster (2005). "Can Translating the Bible Be Bad for Your Health?: William Tyndale and the Falsification of Memory". In Johan Leemans (ed.). More Than a Memory: The Discourse of Martyrdom and the Construction of Christian Identity in the History of Christianity. Peeters Publishers. ISBN 90-429-1688-5.
- Kawerau, G. (1910). "Latomus, Jacobus (Jacques Masson)". The New Schaff-Herzog Encyclopedia of Religious Knowledge. Funk and Wagnalls. pp. 420–421.
- Heribert Smolinsky (1992). "Jacobus Latomus". In Bautz, Traugott (ed.). Biographisch-Bibliographisches Kirchenlexikon (BBKL) (in German). Vol. 4. Herzberg: Bautz. cols. 1219–1221. ISBN 3-88309-038-7.
- Wilkinson, Robert J. (1996). "Reconstructing Tyndale in Latomus: William Tyndale's last, lost, book". Reformation. 1: 252–285. doi:10.1179/ref_1996_1_1_018. Archived from the original on 2008-05-17.
