= Johannes Heurnius =

Dutch physician (1543–1601)

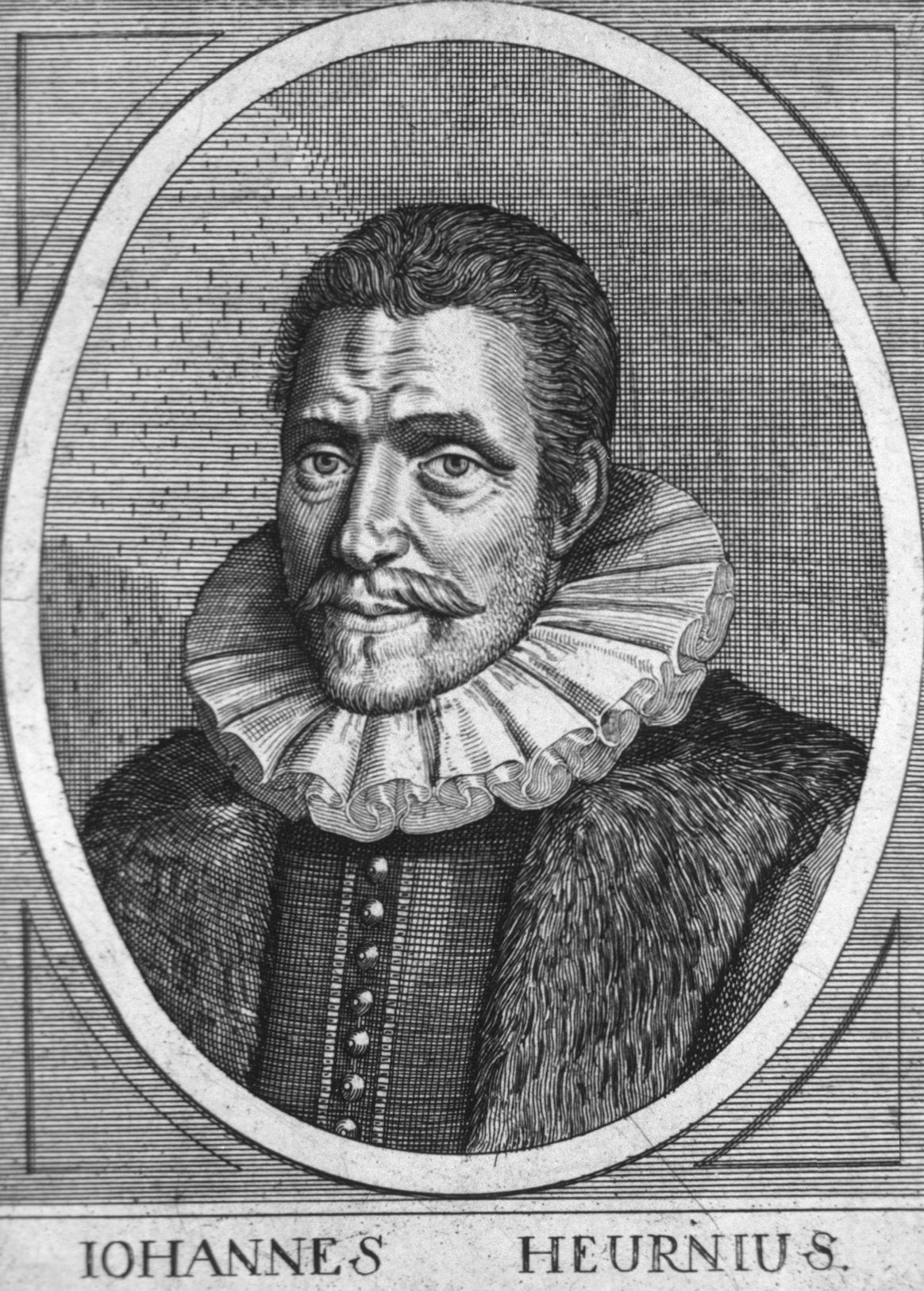
- Johannes Heurnius
- Born: 4 February 1543; Utrecht, Seventeen Provinces
- Died: 11 August 1601 (aged 58); Leiden, Dutch Republic
- Scientific career
- Doctoral advisor: Petrus Ramus; Hieronymus Fabricius
- Doctoral students: Otto Heurnius
- Other notable students: Nicolaus Mulerius

Johannes Heurnius (born Jan van Heurne; 4 February 1543 – 11 August 1601) was a Dutch physician and natural philosopher.

== Life ==
Heurnius was born in Utrecht, and studied at Leuven and Paris. He went to the University of Padua to study under Hieronymus Fabricius; and graduated M.D. there in 1566, examined by Petrus Ramus and Fabricius.

He wrote on the Great Comet of 1577; at that time he was town physician in Utrecht. In 1581 he became professor of medicine at the University of Leiden. Heurnius already had a reputation and good contacts with humanist scholars, and was appointed as senior to Gerardus Bontius, an earlier physician on the faculty.

He was a pioneer of the bedside teaching of medicine, and has been given credit for his methods. From Padua he brought not only anatomy in the tradition of Vesalius, but anatomical demonstrations and practical clinical work. It is not clear, however, if the 1591 proposal by Heurnius and Bontius to implement practical teaching on the Paduan lines was accepted officially. The physician Otto Heurnius was his son; Heurnius's ideas on teaching were transmitted widely through Otto, Franciscus Sylvius, Govert Bidloo and Herman Boerhaave. After his father's death, Otto put together his lectures, published in the Opera Omnia, covering medicine both in theory and as a practical discipline. He died in Leiden, Netherlands.

His son, Justus Van Heurn, Van Heurne, or Heurnius (1587 – c. 1653) was a doctor, missionary, translator, and a botanist. He helped prepare one of the earliest translations of the Bible into Malay and was the first European to collect, document, and record many of the South African Cape plants.

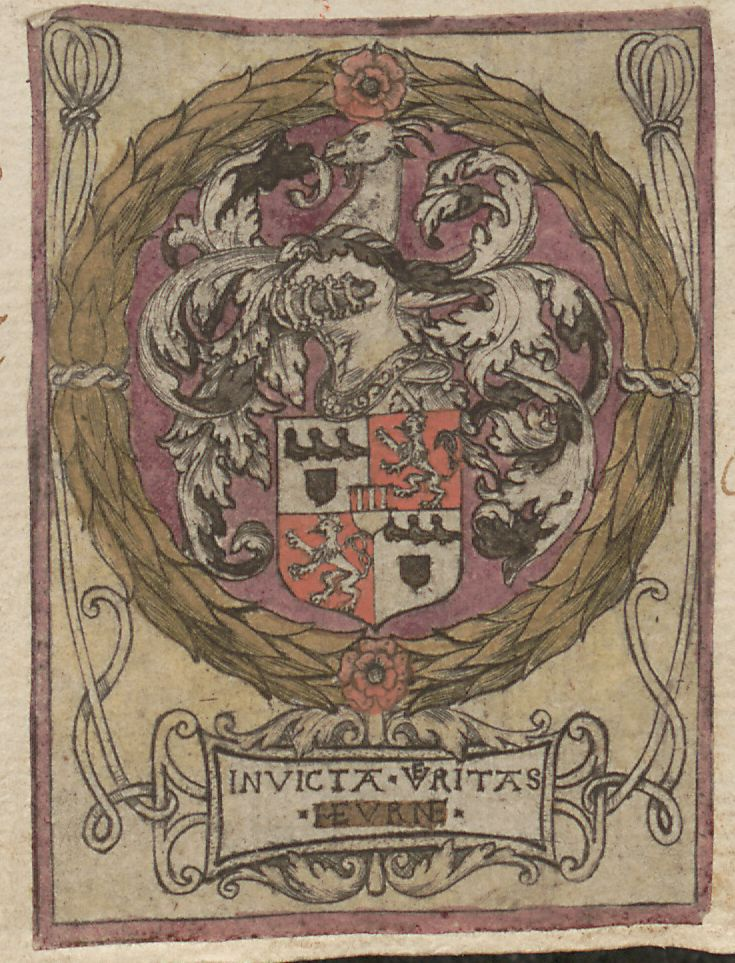
Armorial bookplate of Johannes Heurnius
