= Collegium Trilingue =

University in Belgium

Coordinates: 50°52′52″N 4°42′01″E

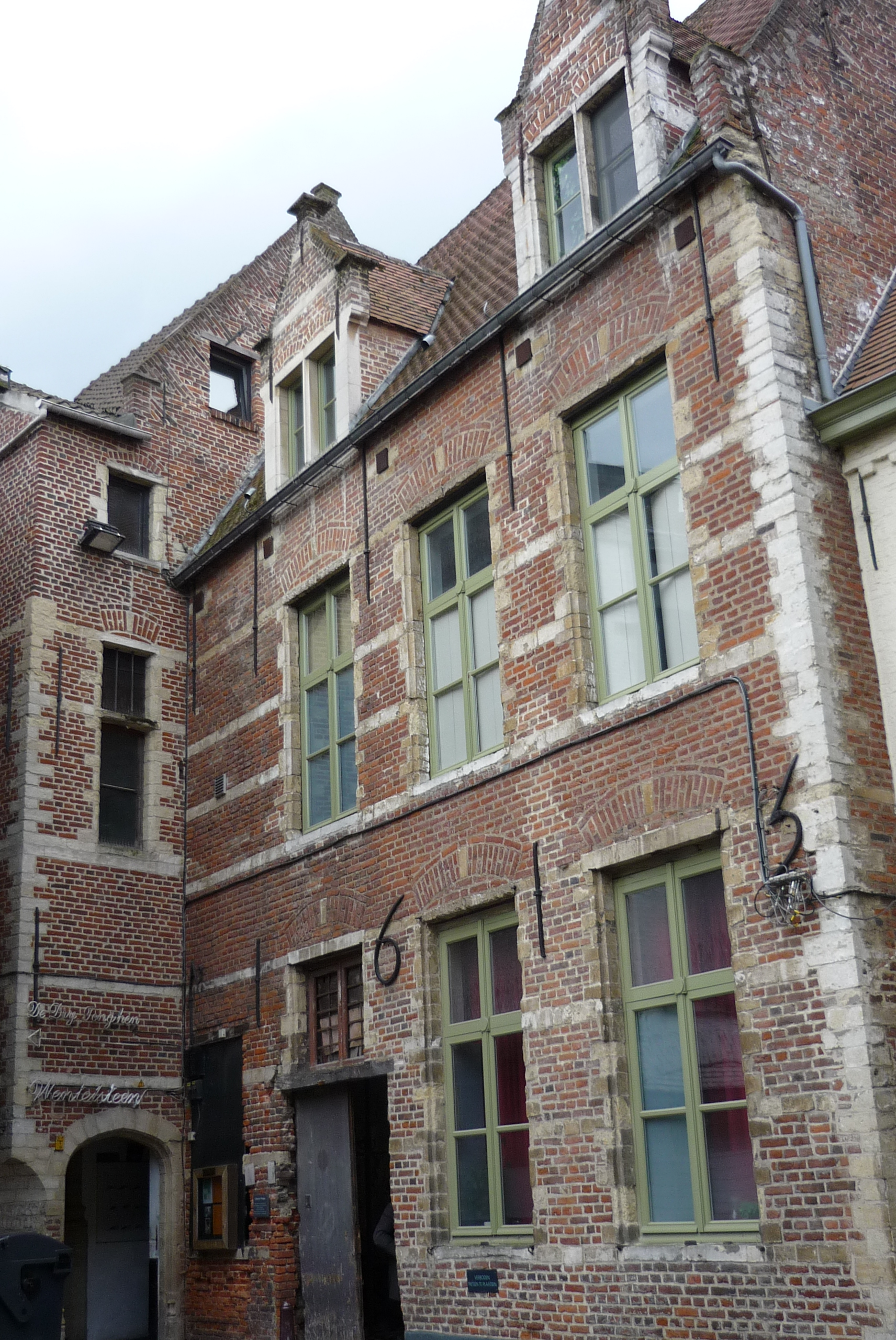
The current façade of the Collegium Trilingue at Leuven, 2010.

The Collegium Trilingue, often also called Collegium trium linguarum, or, after its creator Collegium Buslidianum (French: Collège des Trois Langues, Dutch: Dry Tonghen), is a university that was founded in 1517 under the patronage of the humanist, Hieronymus van Busleyden. The three languages taught were Latin, Greek and Hebrew. It was the model for the Collège de France founded in 1530. It is located in Leuven, Belgium.

== History ==
=== Foundation ===
The Collegium Trilingue was founded thanks to a bequest of Hieronymus Busleyden (c. 1470–1517). Busleyden was born into an influential Luxembourgish family; his father Gilles was a counsellor to Charles the Bold. He studied law in Louvain (during the 1490s), Orléans (at the close of the fifteenth century), and Padua (1501–1503).

During his studies he made the acquaintance of Desiderius Erasmus, one of the leading intellectuals of his age. Busleyden served as a diplomat under Philip I of Castile the Handsome, a function he combined with that of Master of Requests at the Great Council of Mechlin.

Busleyden was also a humanist Maecenas, as well as an art and music lover. In 1503, he started renovating the Mechlin Busleyden Court, turning it into a Renaissance palace whose beauty Thomas admired ("... ut me plane obstupefecerit …").

Busleyden died unexpectedly in August 1517, after he had fallen ill during a diplomatic mission to Spain. The date of his will, 22 June 1517, is generally taken as the foundation date of the Collegium Trilingue.

Busleyden had been advised on the structure and organization of the college by his friend Erasmus. Poor students could apply for one of ten scholarships, while high-born students should pay a fee; and there were three scholarships for professors, one for each language. They should teach publicly, the will stated, and their classes should be free of charge. The supervision of the daily activities of the college and its finances was the responsibility of the president. Erasmus never taught at the Collegium Trilingue, nor did he ever serve in the administration of the college.

The executors of Busleyden's will initially wished for the college to be integrated into one of the existing colleges of the University of Louvain. Their wish did not materialize, however, mainly because of the opposition from the members of the Arts Faculty, which organized Latin courses and did not want competition.

In April 1519, the executors acquired a number of buildings in the vicinity of the Vismarkt. The building complex was inaugurated in October 1520, after extensive renovation works. In addition to a chapel and auditoria, the complex consisted of a kitchen, refectory, rooms for students and professors (accessible through the so-called ‘Wentelsteen’, which still exists today) and a library, providing storage for Busleyden’s invaluable collection of books of manuscripts, which had been brought over from Mechlin by boat. The lectures started well before the construction was finished.

At the instigation of Erasmus, Matthaeus Adrianus (c. 1475–after 1521) started with the Hebrew lectures as early as March 1518, and Hadrianus Barlandus (1486–1536; Latin) and Rutger Rescius (c. 1495–1545; Greek) followed suit in September of the same year.

Meanwhile the relationship with the university remained troublesome. The recent Reuchlin affair in Cologne and the stir caused by Luther in Wittenberg only strengthened the theologians' aversion to the study of Greek and Hebrew, and the Arts Faculty wanted to maintain its monopoly of language teaching. After lingering negotiations and several interventions of important personalities, including the later pope Adrian VI, the Collegium Trilingue was recognized as a university institute by the university council in March 1520. The college was, however, never incorporated into the structure of its natural partner, the Arts Faculty.

=== The 16th century ===
The Collegium Trilingue experienced a difficult start, which, as mentioned, was partly due to issues of housing and the tense relationship with the different faculties.

Both the college and its guiding spirit Erasmus were attacked in academic disputes and sermons by numerous theologians, accusing Erasmus of sympathizing with the Lutheran cause and of other heresies, and claiming that the study of languages was useless at best and harmful at worst for the intellectual development of youngsters.

The concerns and critiques that were voiced by the Louvain theologians were compiled and put to paper in the De trium linguarum et studii theologici ratione dialogus (1519) of Jacobus Latomus (c. 1475–1544), a professor of theology and advisor to the Inquisition.

A further complicating factor was the coming and going of lecturers. Adrianus (Hebrew) left Louvain in dubious circumstances in July 1519, and neither of his immediate successors – Robert Wakefield (d. 1537) and Robert Sherwood, both English by birth – stayed long either. Barlandus (Latin) left in November 1519 and was succeeded by Conrad Goclenius (1490–1539). Rescius (Greek) even spent some time in jail.

The story of the Collegium Trilingue during the 16th century is nonetheless one of success, largely due to the enduring popularity of Erasmus’ scientific and theological program. This program was inspired by Italian humanism, and by the Italian humanist practice of reading literary texts from Greek and Latin Antiquity in specific. The notorious polemicist Lorenzo Valla (c. 1407–1457) had extended the method to the study of the Holy Writ in his Annotationes in Novum Testamentum.

Erasmus had discovered a copy of this work in 1504, in the Park Abbey near Louvain, and Valla was the inspiration behind much of Erasmus’ own theological thought. The Valla-Erasmus method can be summarized by the dictum ‘Ad fontes’: the scientific study of theology should be grounded in a critical reading of the source texts, and should not start from the authorities of medieval scholasticism. To engage in such a reading, a solid grasp of the three holy languages – Latin, Greek and Hebrew – is indispensable. This is the need the Collegium Trilingue addressed: the courses that were organized there were specifically intended to provide students with the basic linguistic competences they needed to read and study scripture.

The college’s program attracted hundreds of students from the early years onward, and already during the 1520s an extension of the existing auditoria was required to accommodate the ever increasing influx of youngsters.

Even after the construction works were finished, Goclenius still had to teach the same class twice due to a lack of space. Throughout the period, the number of people actually living in the college – the president, professors, bursaries, paying students, and staff – remained constant, around twenty in total. Their daily routine included attending masses and participating in communal meals, which were usually copious and varied, particularly on special occasions (as when Erasmus visited). The students additionally carried out small household tasks in the college, and they could make use of the college’s five (i.e., ‘pelotte’) facilities for relaxation.

During the first fifty years after its foundation, the Collegium Trilingue could pride itself on having several prominent figures among its professors. Among them was Petrus Nannius (1496–1557), who held the Latin chair between 1539 and 1557, succeeding to Goclenius, and is known for his work on Virgil (Deuterologiae sive spicilegia Petri Nannii Alcmariani in quartum librum Aeneidos Virgilii, 1544).

Nannius’ successor was the Utrecht scholar and teacher of Justus Lipsius (1547–1606), Cornelius Valerius (1512–1578). Valerius was a gifted pedagogue.

Relying on mainly Virgil and Cicero, who both belonged to the household authors at the college, Valerius wrote a series of textbooks, including one on grammar and one on rhetoric, which were both reprinted numerous times well into the seventeenth century (Grammaticarum institutionum libri, 1550; In universam bene dicendi rationem tabula, 1558).

The college’s alumni from the sixteenth century include several figures who contributed greatly to the advancement of not only philology but a great number of fields of study, including cartography (Mercator), (ancient) history (Lipsius), and medicine (Dodoens, Vesalius).

This period of prosperity came to an abrupt end during the final quarter of the sixteenth century, when Louvain was occupied by Spanish troops in the course of the Eighty Years’ War.

The city and its surrounding area were sacked, and suffered from famine and the plague. Most teaching at the Collegium Trilingue was suspended, after student numbers had dropped drastically (both at the university and at the college), and most professors had fled the city.

=== 17th and 18th centuries ===
In the early 17th century, the Collegium Trilingue was in a deplorable state, despite the appointment of the eminent humanist scholar and philologist Justus Lipsius to the Latin chair in 1592.

A new period of prosperity started when Adrianus Baecx was appointed president in 1606, although the college would never again have the same status as during the early 16th century. Baecx had the buildings of the college restored, and he succeeded in filling the chairs of Greek and Hebrew, which had been vacant ever since the turmoil of the 1580s and 1590s.

Baecx' new Hebrew professor, Valerius Andreas (1588–1655), was one of the very best Hebraists ever to have taught in the college. The teaching of Latin was put into the competent hands of Erycius Puteanus (1547–1646), a student of Lipsius, who enjoyed an international reputation for his rhetorical skill and pedagogical insight. Puteanus was appointed in 1607, and he held the Latin chair for nearly forty years; he was eventually succeeded by Nicolaus Vernulaeus (1583–1649) in 1646.

Vernulaeus taught Latin until his death in 1649. Not averse to self-adulation, Vernulaeus emphasized in his Academia Lovaniensis (1627) that since its foundation in 1517 the Collegium Trilingue had managed to produce first-rung figures in each and every branch of intellectual inquiry.

After the days of Puteanus and Vernulaeus, the college entered a period of decline. There were occasional resurgences, but they were scarce and usually also short-lived, being due to the activities of one professor specifically. Worthy of mention in this regard is Johannes Gerardus Kerkherderen (1677–1738), who taught Latin in the second quarter of the 18th century, as well as Jean-Noël Paquot (1722–1803).

Paquot taught Hebrew, and authored the monumental Mémoires pour servir à l'histoire littéraire des dix-sept provinces des Pays-Bas, de la principauté de Liège, et de quelques contrées voisines (1763–1770, 18 vols.), which to this day is an important source of information regarding the history of the Collegium Trilingue, which survived, but did not flourish.

The Latin chair remained vacant after 1768, and along with the university the Collegium Trilingue was suspended in 1797 during the period of unrest that followed the outbreak of the French Revolution in 1789. The buildings that constituted the college were sold, and after the reinstatement of the university in 1834 the college was never revived.

In the early 20th century, the rector of the University of Louvain, Paulin Ladeuze, envisaged bringing the buildings of the former college into the possession of the university and turn them into a center of humanist studies once again, but these attempts, during the financially challenging period around the First World War, ultimately proved unsuccessful.

The 1970s witnessed a second attempt at revival, which did not materialize either.

During this later period, the buildings of the once-celebrated college served as a social house, printing establishment, ice factory and fish smokehouse, among other things.

== Professors of the Collegium Trilingue ==
Historical list of the professors of the Collegium Trilingue
=== Teachers of Latin === : 1518–1519 Adrianus Barlandus; 1519–1539 Conrad Goclenius; 1539–1557 Petrus Nannius; 1557–1578 Cornelius Valerius; 1586–15xx Guilielmus Huismannus; 1606–1606 Justus Lipsius; 1607–1646 Erycius Puteanus; 1646–1649 Nicolaus Vernulaeus; 1649–1664 Bernardus Heimbachius; 1664–1669 Christianus a Langendonck; 1669–1683 Joannes Baptista Victor de Schuttelaere; 1683–1688 Dominicus Snellaerts; 1683–1693 Leonardus Gautius; 1689–1701 Bernardus Desirant; 1705–1720 Jean Francois de Laddersous; 1730–1741 Christianus Bombaeus; 1722–1738 Gerard Jean Kerckherdere; 1741–1768 Henri Joseph van der Steen	=== Teachers of Greek === : 1518–1545 Rutgerus Rescius; 1545–1560 Hadrianus Amerotius; 1560–1578 Theodoricus Langius; 1578–1590 Guilielmus Fabius; 1591–1596 Gerardus Corselius; 1606–1607 Henricus Zoesius; 1609–1632 Petrus Castellanus; 1632–1643 Petrus Stockmans; 1643–1652 Mathieu Theige; 1652–1654 Jean Normenton; 1654–1664 Bernardus Heymbachius; 1664–1680 Jean de Hamere; 1681–1690 Rutger van den Burgh; 1683–1722 Francois Martin; 1723–1732 Franciscus Audenaert; 1723–1740 Francois Claude de Guareux; 1741–1782 Jean-Baptiste Zegers; 1782–1787 Jean Hubert Joseph Leemput; 1790–1791 Jean-Baptiste Cypers; 1791–1797 Antoine van Gils	=== Teachers of Hebrew === : 1518–1519 Mattheus Adrianus; 1519–1519 Robert Wakefield; 1519–1519 Robert Shirwood; 1520–1531 Johannes Campensis; 1532–1568 Andreas Gennepius; 1568–1569 Johannes Guilielmus Harlemius; 1569–1577 Petrus Pierius a Smenga; 1612–1655 Valerius Andreas; 1656–1679 Joannes Sauterus; 1679–1704 Jean Herrys; 1704–1723 Jean Guillaume van Hove; 1726–1750 Gilbert Joseph Hagen; 1755–1772 Jean-Noël Paquot; 1774–1782 Gerard Deckers; 1782–1786 Joseph Benoit de Mazière; 1790–1797 Etienne Heuschling

== See also ==
- Academic libraries in Leuven
- Catholic University of Leuven
- Collège de France
- Guillaume Budé
- List of colleges of Leuven University
- Old University of Leuven

== Bibliography ==
- Félix Nève, Mémoire historique et littéraire sur Le Collége (sic) des Trois-Langues à l'Université de Louvain, M. Hayez, Brussels, 1856.
- Papy, Jan, ed., Erasmus’ droom: Het Leuvense Collegium Trilingue 1517–2017. Catalogus bij de tentoonstelling in de Leuvense Universiteitsbibliotheek, 18 oktober 2017 – 18 januari 2018, Peeters, Leuven/Paris/Bristol, CT, 2017.
- Papy, Jan, ed., The Leuven Collegium Trilingue 1517–1797: Erasmus, humanist educational practice and the new language institute Latin – Greek – Hebrew, Peeters, Leuven/Paris/Bristol, CT, 2018.
- Henry de Vocht, History of the foundation and the rise of the Collegium Trilingue Lovaniense, 1517–1550, in Humanistica Lovaniensia, n° 10–13, 1951–1955.
- Henry de Vocht, Les Débuts du Collège Trilingue de Louvain, 1517–1550, Uytspruyt, Louvain, 1958.
- See also DaLeT: Databank van het Leuvense Trilingue.
