= Helenius Acron =

Ancient Roman grammarian

Helenius Acron (or Acro) was a Roman commentator and grammarian, probably of the 3rd century AD, but whose precise date is not known.

Helenius Acron is known to have written on Terence (Adelphi and Eunuchus at least) and Horace. These commentaries on Horace are now lost but are referred to by the grammarian Charisius. There is some evidence for a commentary on Persius.

Scholia attributed to Acron appear in manuscripts of Horace; there are three recensions known, the earliest dating to the 5th century. The fragments which remain of the work on Horace, though much mutilated, are valuable, as containing the remarks of the older commentators, Quintus Terentius Scaurus and others. The attribution to Acron, however, is not found before the 15th century, and is doubtful. The scholiast may therefore be called Pseudo-Acron.

Fragments of Acron's writing may also appear in Pomponius Porphyrion.
