= Adrianus Barlandus =

Dutch historian

Adriaan van Baarland or Adrianus Barlandus or Hadrianus Barlandus (1486–1538) was a Dutch historian. He was born in the village of Baarland, from which he took his name. He studied at Ghent and Leuven, at which latter place he was elected professor of eloquence at the Collegium Trilingue in 1526, after a stay of some years in England. He died in Leuven in 1538, and was succeeded at the Collegium Trilingue by Conrad Goclenius.

Besides some philological works of no great value, Van Baarland wrote a number of historical works, especially about the various provinces in the Low Countries.

== Works ==
- Rhetorice isagoge
- Vita honesta, sive virtvtis
- Die cronijcke van Brabant int corte
