= Janus Dousa =

Dutch statesman (1545–1604)

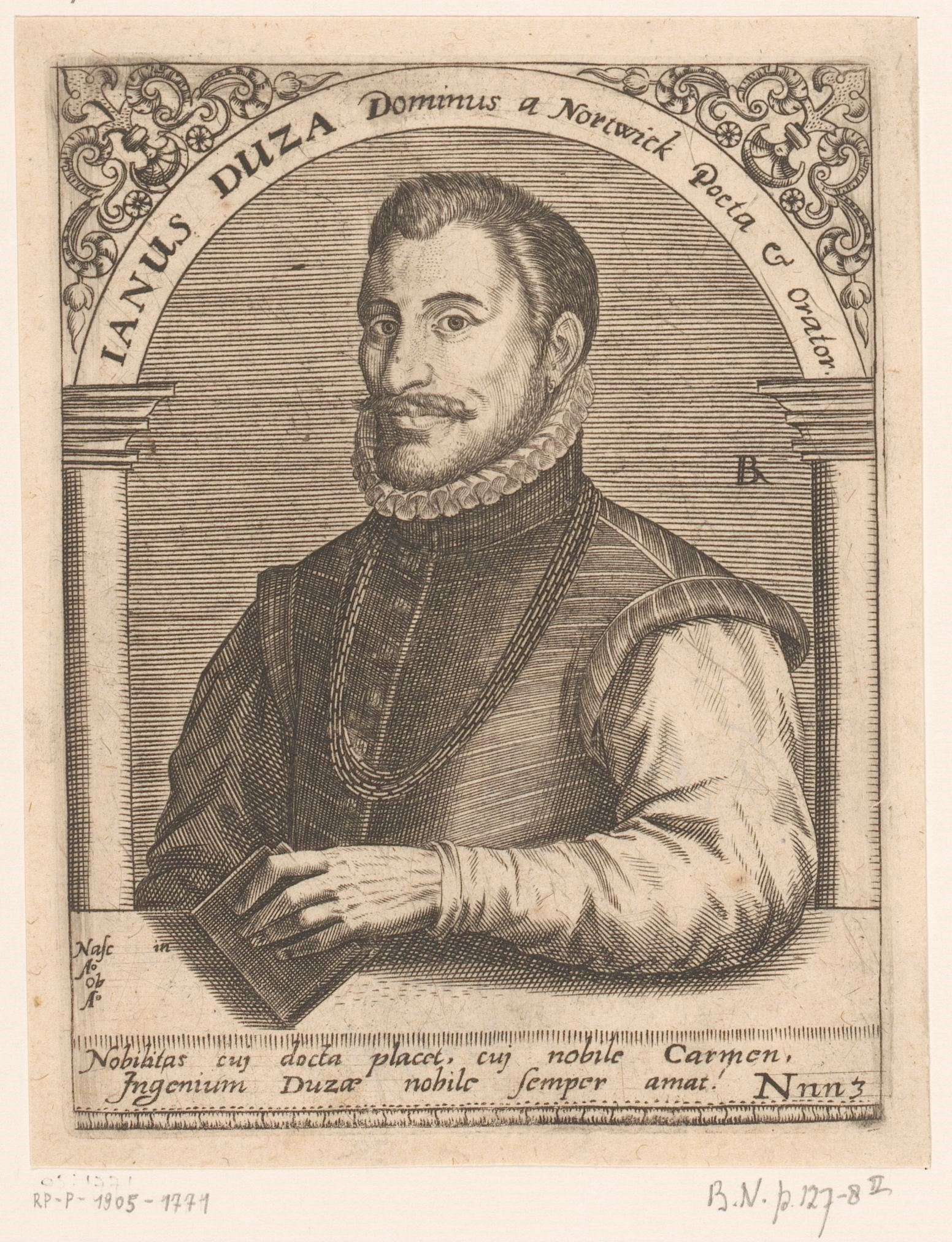
Janus Dousa

Janus Dousa (Latinized from Jan van der Does), Lord of Noordwyck (6 December 1545 – 8 October 1604), was a Dutch statesman, jurist, historian, poet and philologist, and the first Librarian of Leiden University Library.

== Biography ==
He was born in Noordwijk, in the province of Holland. Dousa's parents, Johan van der Does, lord of Noordwijk, and Anna van Nijenrode died when their son was only five years old. Dousa was placed under the guardianship of his grandfather Frans van Nijenrode until his death in 1560 and later of his uncle Werner van der Does, lord of Kattendijke. He began his studies at Lier in Brabant, became a pupil of Henry Junius at Delft in 1560, and then passed on in succession to Louvain, Douai and Paris. Here he studied Greek under Jean Dorat, professor at the College Royal, and became acquainted with the chancellor L'Hopital, Adrianus Turnebus, Pierre de Ronsard and other eminent men. On his return in 1565 he married Elizabeth van Zuylen.

Dousa was a member of the lower nobility. From his father he inherited the lordship of Noordwijk, from his uncle Werner the lordship of Kattendijke. He returned to his estates in 1566, the year of the iconoclastic fury, when the Low Countries were on the threshold of a new period in their history: the Dutch Revolt. He was not, however, at first very eager to commit himself to the fortunes of William the Silent, Prince of Orange, but having once chosen his side, he threw himself heart and soul into the struggle for freedom from Spain. In his lordships Dousa adopted a moderate policy of religious tolerance: both Catholicism and Protestantism were allowed. As a member of the nobility he joined the ‘Verbond der Edelen,’ the confederation of noblemen against the religious policy of Philip II of Spain. In 1570 he became ‘hoogheemraad’ (inspector of the dikes) and a member of the States of Holland on behalf of the nobility. When in 1572 the Revolt formally began with the first independent meeting of the States-General, Dousa joined it. In the same year he participated in an embassy to queen Elizabeth I of England to ask for support against Spain.

Fortunately for Leiden, he was residing in the town at the time of the famous siege. He held no post in the government, but in the hour of need he, though not trained to arms, took the command of a company of troops. His own resolution encouraged the regents and citizens to prolong the defense. On the foundation of the Leiden University by William the Silent, Dousa was appointed first curator, and he held this office for nearly thirty years. Through his friendships with foreign scholars, he drew to Leiden many illustrious teachers and professors. After the assassination of the Prince of Orange in 1584, Dousa undertook a private journey to England to try to persuade Queen Elizabeth to support the cause of the states, and in 1585 he went at the head of a formal embassy for the same purpose. She refused to accept the sovereignty of the Republic of the Seven United Netherlands, because she did not want to risk a war with Spain, but she was willing to send Robert Dudley, earl of Leicester, with a small army, to lend support. About the same time Dousa was appointed keeper of the archive of Holland (registermeester van Holland), and the opportunities thus afforded him of historical research he turned to good account. In 1591 he was appointed a justice in the Hoge Raad van Holland en Zeeland which he remained until his death.

He died at Noordwijk and was interred at the Hague; but no monument was erected to his memory until 1792, when one of his descendants placed a tomb to his honour in the church of Noordwyck. There are good portraits of the Great Dousa, as he was often called, by Visscher and Houbraken.

=== Family ===
He had twelve children, but only nine of them, seven sons and two daughters, reached adult age. All his sons acquired a reputation for learning, especially Janus Dousa Filius ('the son'), but he died in 1596 at the age of 25, well before his father.

== Publications ==
In 1569 Dousa published his first collection of poems (epigrams, satires, elegies, etc.). A new collection appeared in 1575. This collection contains (among other poems) five Odae Lugdunenses on the siege of Leiden. In 1584 a volume of epodes was issued. In 1585 Dousa wrote the Odae Britannicae. 1586 saw the release of a new book of elegies.

In 1599 and 1601 Dousa's historiographical works appeared. In 1603 a poetic volume called Echo and a collection of three odes was released. Some more works were issued posthumously. Apart from these literary works Dousa published collections of text-critical remarks on and editions of classical authors: Sallust, Horace, Catullus, Tibullus, Petronius, Plautus, Propertius.

Dousa's historiographical labour is especially relevant. In 1585, when Dousa was 40 years old, he became the first Librarian at Leiden University Library with a special commission to write a history of Holland. At that moment however, he had been pursuing historical studies for several years. If one is to trust Heinsius’ eulogy, Dousa had been studying history since the moment he returned from France. Letters from the years 1582 and 1583 prove that Dousa had at least been deepening his knowledge of the history of Holland since 1577. In the letter from 1582 one even comes across a specimen of his Annales written in hexameters. In 1584 Dousa edited the work of Adrianus Barlandus, a historiographer from Zeeland.

His first accomplishment after his commission in 1585 was the posthumous publication of the work of Hadrianus Junius in 1588. However, his political activities prevented him from finishing his own history within a few years. In 1593 two Epistulae apologeticae were published in which Dousa apologized for the fact that the commissioned work had still not appeared. However, the States of Holland had to wait for their history still longer when Dousa's eldest son died in 1597. Sorrow kept Dousa from finishing his work until 1599. In this year the metrical Annales were published. Finally, the commissioned prose history (Bataviae Hollandiaeque Annales) was published in 1601. Dousa was rewarded by the States of Holland with a golden chain, a medal, and exemption from the obligation to appear in the Supreme Court. In 1604 Dousa intended to edit the works of the historians Johannes de Beka and Willem Heda, but on 8 October of the same year he died of the plague before he was able to realize this plan.

- Jani Dousae filii Poemata. - Roterodami : apud Adrianum van Dijk, 1704. digital

== See also ==
- Franciscus Dousa
