= Franciscus Deurweerders =

Franciscus Deurweerders (c. 1616–1666) was a Dominican spiritual writer in the Spanish Netherlands, and the founder of the Confraternity of the Cord of Saint Thomas.

== Life ==
Deurweerders was born in Antwerp around 1616 and entered the Antwerp house of the Dominican Order.

He visited Rome around 1644 and made a pilgrimage to the miraculous portrait of St Dominic in Soriano Calabro. During this pilgrimage he experienced the efficacy of the "Cord of St Thomas Aquinas" and undertook to found a confraternity dedicated to the devotion upon his return to the Low Countries. He discussed his plans with Vincenzo Candido, vicar general of the order, before his return. With letters of recommendation from Candido, Deurweerders was able to view, sketch, and take measurements of the original cord of St Thomas Aquinas in the Dominican house at Vercelli.

With the approval of Jacobus Boonen, archbishop of Mechelen, the confraternity was founded at Brussels on 1 March 1649, under the name Angelic Militia. The University of Leuven took the confraternity under its protection on 5 March, and on 7 March, the Feast of St Thomas Aquinas, all the professors and students of the Faculty of Theology were enrolled, Libert Froidmont first of all, as well as a number of members of other faculties.

Deurweerders was assigned to teach philosophy in the Dominican house of studies in Leuven. He later served on the Holland Mission in Rotterdam, and died in Antwerp on 4 July 1666.

== Works ==
- Summularum explicatio cum gravioribus quaestionibus a summulistis disputari solitis, authore B. P. F. Didaco Ortiz, Hispalensi, ordinis preadicatorum (Leuven, Hieronymus Nempaeus, 1649)
- De Dynsdaegsche devotie tot den S. Dominicus om van Godt te verkryghen al 'tghene wy begheeren (Antwerp, Widow of Joannes Cnobbaert, 1657)
- Militia angelica Divi Thomæ Aquinatis contra vitia carnis primum incœpta (Leuven, Nempaeus, 1659; reissued by Guilliam Stryckwant, 1685)
- De saelighe biechte van de daeghelyksche sonden. De H. Maeltyd waer wy Jesus Christus ontvanghen. De Gheestelycke communie (Antwerp, Michiel Cnobbaert 1661)
