= St Ivo's College, Leuven =

Saint Ivo's College
- Sint-Ivocollege
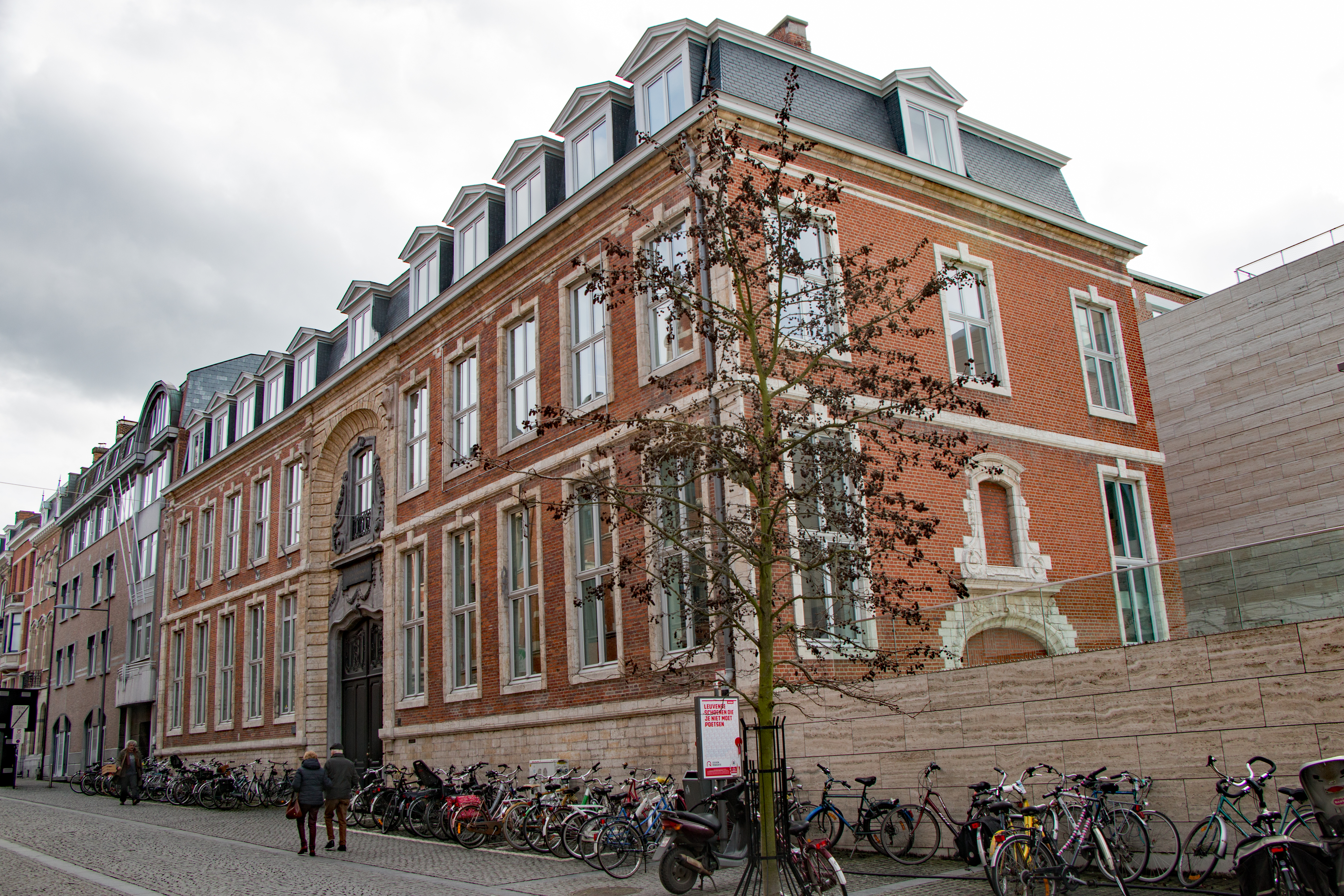
- Latin: Collegium Sancti Ivonis
- Other name: Collège de Saint-Yves
- Type: college
- Active: 1483–1797
- Religious affiliation: Catholic
- Academic affiliation: Old University of Leuven
- Location: Leuven, Belgium

Saint Ivo's College (founded 1483) was a college at the Old University of Leuven that provided accommodation and facilities for poor students in the Faculty of Law. The founder was Robertus de Lacu, originally from Ghent, who had been professor of canon law since 1463. The college was dedicated to Ivo of Kermartin, the patron saint of lawyers, and was used by the law faculty for faculty meetings and ceremonies. The original library was destroyed by marauding Spanish soldiers in 1578, during the Dutch Revolt.

The medieval college was extensively rebuilt in 1775-76 to plans drafted by Jacques Antoine Hustin, only the frontage now remaining. The college ceased to function as such when the university was closed down in 1797.

From 1830 to 1914 the building housed Leuven's commercial court and small claims court. It was badly damaged during the First World War, and extensively renovated as a result. It then housed the Municipal Academy of Fine Arts. An extension was added in 1937 at an angle to the original building. The former college is now part of M – Museum Leuven and has been registered as built heritage since 2009.

== See also ==
- List of colleges of Leuven University
