= Basile-Jean Risopoulos =

Belgian lawyer and politician

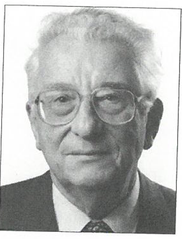

Member of the Belgian Senate
- In office 1968–1974

Member of the Chamber of Representatives
- In office 1977–1985

Personal details
- Born: October 27, 1919 Schaerbeek, Belgium
- Died: May 5, 1997 (aged 77)
- Citizenship: Belgian
- Party: Liberal Party; Rassemblement bruxellois Francophone Democratic Federalists
- Education: Université libre de Bruxelles
- Occupation: Lawyer

Basile-Jean Risopoulos, (27 October 1919 – 5 May 1997) was a Belgian lawyer and politician who served in the Belgian senate from 1968 to 1974.

== Early life ==
Basile-Jean Risopoulos was born on 27 October 1919 in Schaerbeek to a modest family. His father was Greek and his mother was Belgian. His brother, Stéphane, became an Agricultural engineer after his studies at Gembloux. In 1954, Risopolous married Francine Willems, a Belgian lawyer. They had two children; Sylvie, who became Administrative Director at the French Community Commission, and André, a criminal lawyer.

Basile-Jean Risopoulos studied at the official school on boulevard Clovis and at the Atheneum of Schaerbeek. Risopoulos attended the Université libre de Bruxelles, where he was a double major in history and law. It was here where he became interested in politics, joining the Liberal Party and becoming the president of the young liberals of Schaerbeek at age 19.

From 1940 to 1942, Risopoulos became a secondary school teacher in history and geography at the Athénée de Saint-Gilles.

During the Second World War, he received his diploma in history and his doctorate in law. He took the lawyer's oath, but did not immediately start his legal career.

In 1942, Risopoulos entered the Secret Army before being arrested by German authorities. He spent seven months in Saint-Giles Prison before being sent to Merksplas where he escaped, becoming a fugitive.

Toward the end of the war, Risopoulos traveled to Scotland where he received training to become a Commando in the British Army. In 1945, he participated in the Baltic Offensive, and the liberation of several Nazi concentration camps.

== Career ==
=== Legal career ===
After five months in Germany, Risopoulos continued his legal career, working as an intern with the Brussels bar association and beginning a position with the Ministry of Reconstruction, where he began his career as a lawyer. He served as president of the Young Bar Association from 1961 to 1962 and as secretary of the Belgian Bar Association from 1963 to 1965.

=== Career in politics ===
Risopoulos continued his job as a lawyer while pursuing a career as a politician. In January 1965 he became a delegate to the Liberal Party's convention in Liege and later served on the Commission for Improvement of Community Relations (Meyers Commission).

In reaction to the growing Flemish nationalist movement, Risopoulos stood up for liberal views, advocating for bilingualism and defending the rights of Francophones in Flanders.

In 1968, the Walen buiten affair at the Université de Louvain led to the end of the PSC/PLPcoalition government and created a political division where political parties were based on linguistic differences. Because of this, Risopoulos joined the "Group of 28" in order to prepare for the First Belgian state reform.

From 1968 to 1974, Risopoulos served in the Senate as a member from the Province of Brabant. From 1974 to 1976 he was the President of the Liberal Party's Brussels division and a participant in the Senate debates on Belgian federalism until 1977. He was later elected to the Chamber of Representatives, where he served from 1977 to 1985. Risopoulos later founded Rassemblement bruxellois with François Persoons, Lucine Outers, André Lagasse, and Antoinette Spaak with the goal to defend and protect the rights of francophones in the Brussels Region.

In 1978, Risopoulos rejoined the Francophone Democratic Federalists because, according to him, the other parties had not done enough to prevent the rise of Flemish Nationalist movements.

From 1986 to 1989, he served as president of the first Brussels Regional Council as well as the Vice President to the Prime Minister of the French Community Commission and an échevin for the City of Brussels. From 1994 to 1997 he took part in the community management of Ixelles, where he became the échevin for Finance, Personnel and Litigation.

=== Other roles ===
During his career, Risopoulos was a patron of performance art, following the work of the Mudra Ballet school, and the Royal Conservatory of Brussels. He was also an active card player, playing with the Maison de la Belote. In 1983, he founded a branch of the Richelieu Club in Brussels. The club serves to defend French culture and language.

From 1971 to 1975, in addition to his legal and political positions, he served as Vice President for the administrative council of Université libre de Bruxelles, President of the Maison de la Francité as well as a member of the AFAL (Francophone Association of Friendship and Liaison).

== Bibliography ==
Archive de la Commune D'Ixelles, "Ixelles votre commune", XL, 1996, p. 20.

Bourton, W., "Il consacra toute sa vie à sa carrière politique à la défense des intérêts des francophones, Basile Risopoulos est mort à 78 ans", disponible sur https://www.lesoir.be/art/il-consacra-toute-sa-carriere-politique-a-la-defense-de_t-19970506-Z0DNUM.html, consulté le 25 novembre 2019.

DuJardin, V. et DelCorps, V., FDF: 50 ans d'engagement politique, Bruxelles, Racine, 2014, p. 262.

Gerard, A., "Nouvelles figure dans les collèges (26), Risopoulos ou la nouvelle alliance", disponible sur https://www.lesoir.be/art/nouvelles-figures-dans-les-colleges-26-risopoulos-ou-la_t-19950210-Z093P4.html, consulté le 25 novembre 2019.

Jaumotte, A-L., "Nouvelle biographie nationale volume 7", disponible sur https://web.archive.org/web/20170908091341/http://www.academieroyale.be/cgi?lg=fr&pag=658&rec=0&frm=0&par=aybabtu, consulté le 1er décembre 2019.

Van Ham, C., Silhouette, J.T., 1977, p. 71.

Van Molle, P., Le Parlement belge 1894–1969, Gand, Ledeberg, 1969, p. 283.

X, "Élections législatives de 1971: La désignation des sénateurs provinciaux et cooptés", disponible sur https://www.worldcat.org/title/courrier-hebdomadaire-du-crisp/oclc/909781580?lang=fr, consulté le 25 novembre 2019.

X, "Le Parlement de la Fédération Wallonie-Bruxelles", disponible sur https://www.pfwb.be/les-deputes/basile-risopoulos, consulté le 20 novembre 2019.

X, "Les premières élections des Conseils d'agglomération et de Fédération dans la Région Bruxelloise du 21 novembre 1971", disponible sur https://www.worldcat.org/title/courrier-hebdomadaire-du-crisp/oclc/909781580?lang=fr, consulté le 3 décembre 2019.

X, "Names of the Belgian Commandos", disponible sur http://www.brigade-piron.be/paras-cdo/zz-commandos_noms.htm, consulté le 5 décembre 2019.
