= Pope's College, Leuven =

Pope's College
- Pauscollege
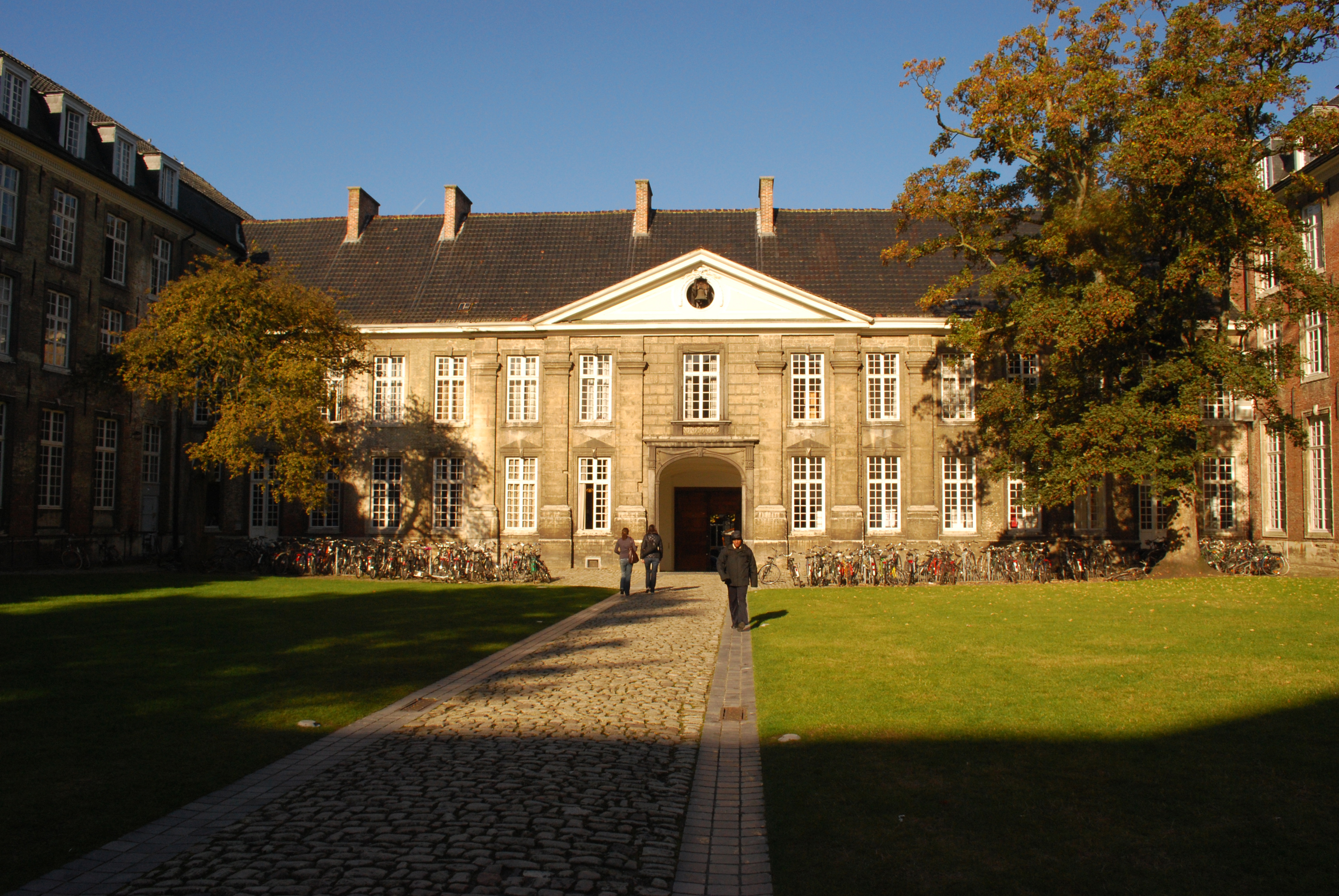
- The 18th-century front building viewed from across the quad
- Type: College for Theology (Old University of Leuven); Hall of residence (Katholieke Universiteit Leuven)
- Established: 1523; 503 years ago
- Religious affiliation: Catholic
- Academic affiliations: Katholieke Universiteit Leuven
- Location: Leuven, Belgium; 50°52′37″N 4°42′10″E
- Nickname: Papists
- Website: www.pauscollege.com/information.html

Pope's College or Pope Adrian VI College in Leuven was a college for theology students at the Old University of Leuven, founded by Pope Adrian VI in 1523. At the suppression of the old university in 1797 the college became public property. It is now a hall of residence of the Katholieke Universiteit Leuven, rented from the city council (which still owns the buildings).

== History ==
The college, founded for Theology students at the University of Leuven in 1523, was considerably extended as early as 1530 and rapidly became one of the richest constituent colleges of the University of Leuven. After a building collapse in 1775, the whole complex was rebuilt to a classicist design by M. Ghenne.

On government orders the college was converted into a seminary in 1786. In 1792 it became the headquarters of the Republican Party, in 1797 a hospital and in 1811 a barracks. Since 1835 it has been in use as a hall of residence of the Catholic University of Leuven, since 1968 known as KU Leuven. The interiors were thoroughly modernized in 1967 by the architect P. Van Aerschot. In 1973 the buildings became a listed monument, now overseen by the Flemish organization for Immovable Heritage.

== See also ==
- List of colleges of Leuven University

== Bibliography ==
- J. Couttenier, "Adrianus VI en het Pauscollege te Leuven", Meer Schoonheid 32/3 (1985): 81-90.
- E. De Maesschalck, Kollegestichtingen aan de universiteit te Leuven 1425-1530 (Leuven, 1977).
- G. Paesmans, "De 18de- eeuwse universitaire colleges te Leuven", M & L 11/4 (1992): 23-35.
- P. Van Aerschot, "Le Collège du Pape à Louvain", Environnement 7-8 (1971): 275-282.
