= Arras College, Leuven =

Arras College
- Atrechtcollege
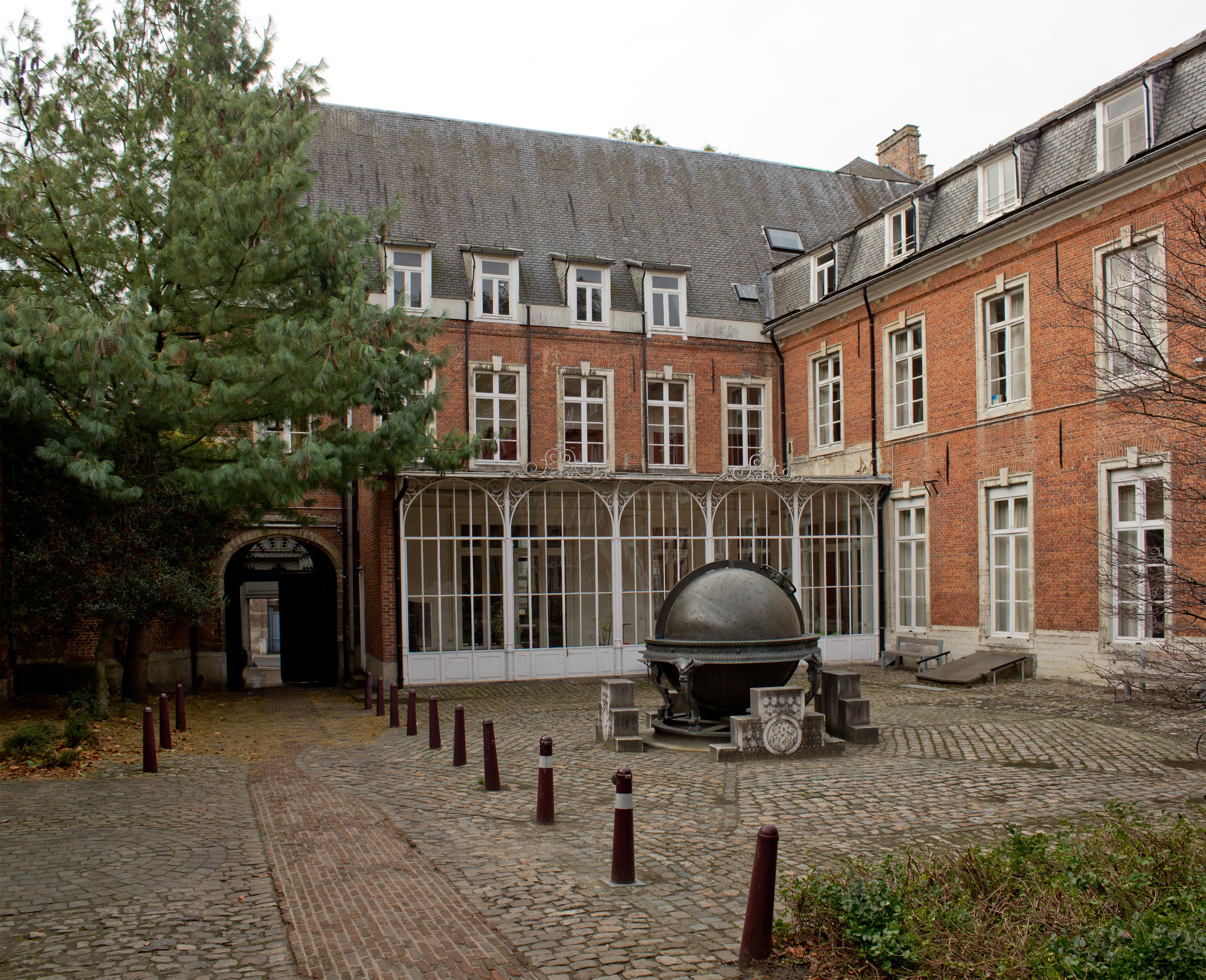
- Latin: Collegium Atrebatense
- Other names: Collège d'Arras
- Type: college
- Active: 1508–1797
- Religious affiliation: Catholic
- Academic affiliations: Leuven University
- Location: Leuven, Belgium

Arras College (founded 1508) was a college at the Old University of Leuven that provided accommodation for poor students in the Liberal Arts who intended to train for the priesthood. The founder was Nicolaus Ruterius, Bishop of Arras, a native of the Duchy of Luxembourg who had been chancellor of the university and provost of St. Peter's Church, Leuven.

== Foundation ==
Ruterius was a friend of Jan Standonck, whose foundation of Standonck College inspired his plan to found a college of his own. He was encouraged in this purpose by Professor Adrianus Florenszoon, who would later become Pope Adrian VI. Ruterius in 1505 bought a patrician house with a large garden to serve as the college and endowed the foundation with annuities and real estate. Work began on the college in 1508, a year before the founder's death, and was directed by the builder Arnold de Wreede. The college chapel, built by master masons Jan Oege and Jan Waelraven, was consecrated in 1519. The size of the initial endowment, augmented over time with donations and bequests from others, made Arras College one of the richest at the university, able to take in increasing numbers of students, and providing space for students of law and theology as well as the liberal arts.

New accommodation was added in 1633, in what had been part of the garden, and extensive renovations were carried out in the 1770s, when a monumental gateway was also added to the property.

== Confiscation ==
At the suppression of the university by the French invaders in 1797, the building became the property of the state. In 1807 it was sold at auction to a wine merchant, who had part of the chapel and part of the student accommodation demolished to build rental property and wine cellars. The property passed to other private owners until 1870, when it was bought by the city with an eye to incorporating the garden into a city park. The following year, the property was sold again to Professor Léon Bossu. In 1887 it became the residence of Baron Édouard Descamps, professor of law and an eminent statesman.

== Restoration ==
The university began to admit women to study for degrees in 1920, and in 1921 the property that had been Arras College was acquired by the Congregation of the Daughters of Mary to set up a hall of residence for female students, which lasted until 1977. Since 1979 the property has housed a number of advisory and support services of the KU Leuven, and since the 1980s also the Ferdinand Verbiest Foundation and the China-Europe Institute for cultural and scholarly co-operation. Parts of the site have been protected heritage since 1974.

== See also ==
- List of colleges of Leuven University
