= Academic libraries in Leuven =

List of libraries in Leuven, Belgium

Coordinates: 50°52′41″N 4°42′27″E

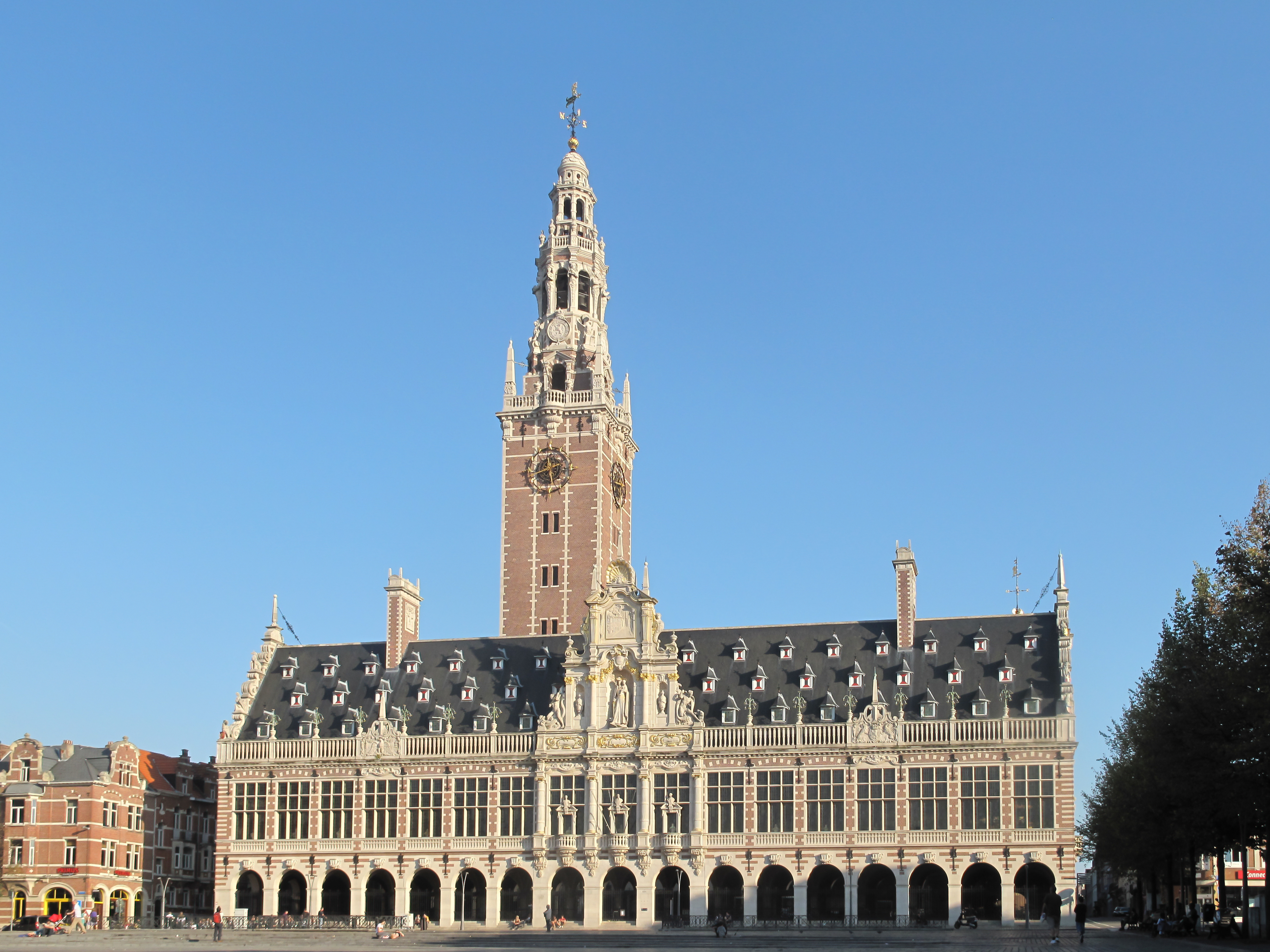
The current central library of the Catholic University of Leuven, rebuilt after the fire of 1940.

The city of Leuven in Belgium was the seat of three successive universities, each of which had a notable academic library.

== The Library of the Old University ==
The Old University of Leuven founded in 1425 had a collegiate structure with no central library. Students probably had access to manuscripts and printed books preserved in their colleges, in stationers' offices, and in the homes of their professors. With the bequests to the university of the libraries of Laurentius Beyerlinck, a canon of Antwerp Cathedral, in 1627, and of Professor of Medicine Jacobus Romanus in 1637, a central library was established in the University Hall, under the management of the jurist and historian Valerius Andreas.

=== Seizure by the French ===
In 1797, the manuscripts and most valuable works were seized by the French state and transported partly to the National Library of France in Paris and partly to the Central School of Brussels. The library of the Central School of Brussels had about 80,000 volumes, which eventually passed into the possession of the City of Brussels and then the Royal Library of Belgium. Similarly, the rich archives of the Old University are now held by the National Archives of Belgium.

It is also very likely that during the troubles of the wars of the French Revolution many books and valuable documents were removed from the collection. Several libraries across Europe now have books and manuscripts that certainly came from Leuven University Library, such as the founding charter of 1425 which was located in 1909 at the seminary of 's-Hertogenbosch, or the courses of the law professor Henricus de Piro which were located in the late 20th century in the National Széchényi Library in Budapest.

== The Library of the State University ==
The State University of Leuven, founded in 1817, also established a library. In 1826 the librarian was Karl Bernhardi. He was succeeded by P. Namur.

The nucleus of its collection was formed by the works of the municipal library of Leuven that the city offered the State University in 1817. In addition, the State University received from the government of the Netherlands the sum of 20,000 guilders to enrich its book funds.

== The Library of the Catholic University ==
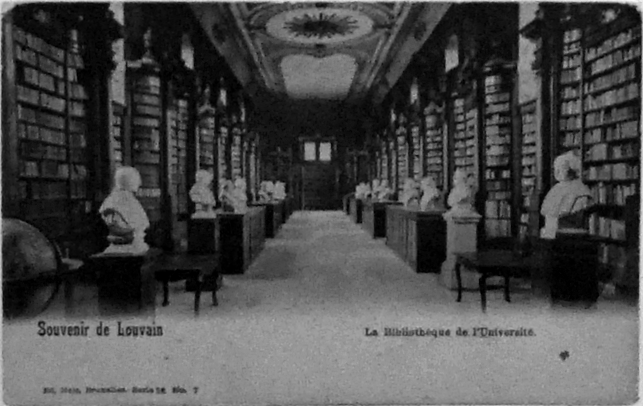
The library of the Catholic University of Leuven in a turn-of-century postcard

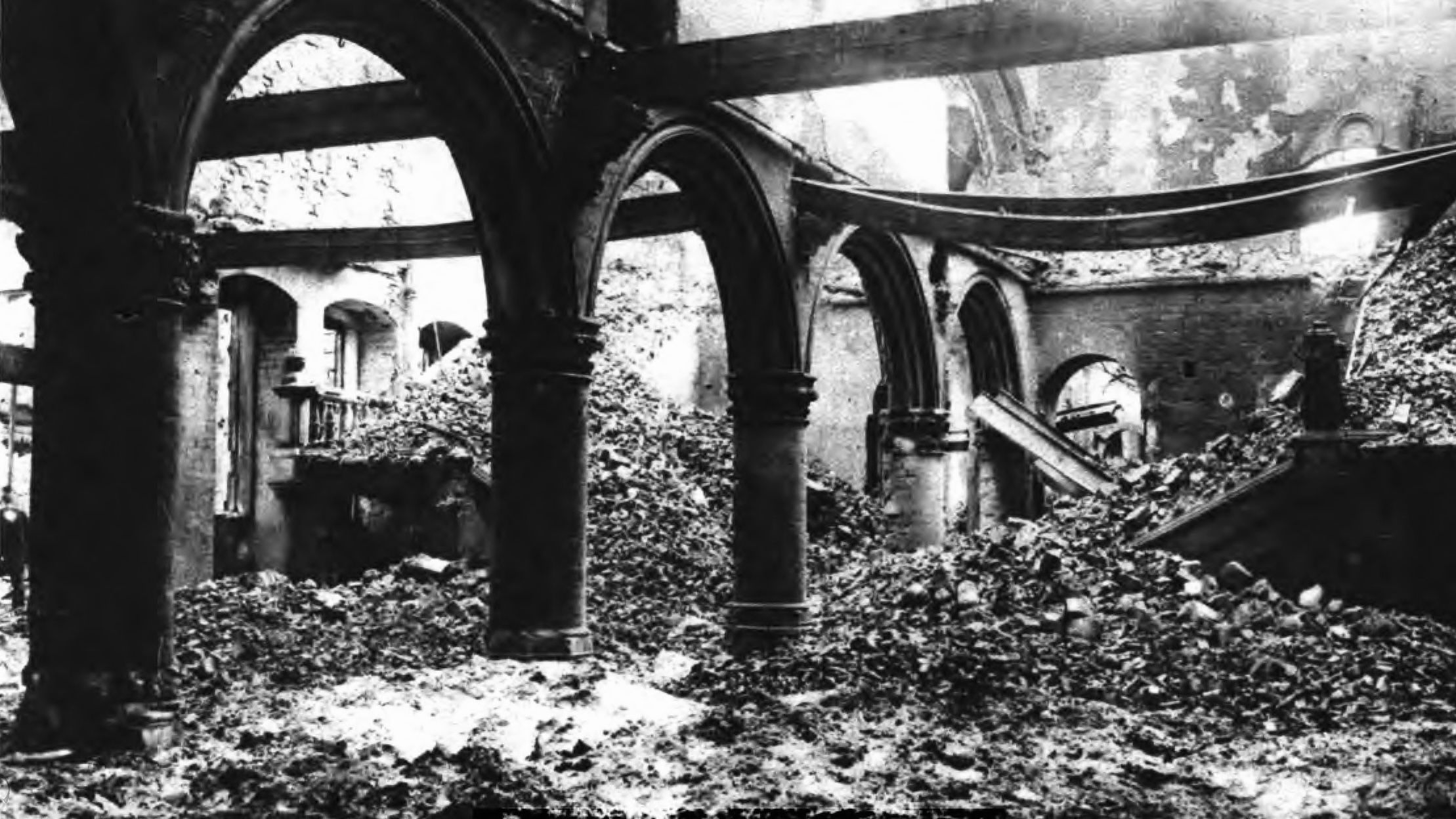
The ruins of the University of Leuven's library after it was burned by the German army in 1914

This library was established in Mechelen at the very beginning of the Catholic University of Belgium in 1834. In 1835 the Catholic University of Mechelen moved to Leuven and became the Catholic University of Leuven, with a leasehold on the University Hall, where the library was again kept until 1914.

=== World War I destruction ===
This library was burned by German soldiers at the beginning of the First World War, destroying approximately 230,000 books, 950 manuscripts, and 800 incunabula.

After the First World War a new purpose-built library was erected on the Ladeuzeplein in a building of neo-Flemish Renaissance style, designed by the American architect Whitney Warren and built between 1921 and 1928. The library's book collection was rebuilt with donations from all around the world which had been outraged by the act from which it had suffered.

=== World War II destruction ===
The library burned again in 1940, probably following exchanges of fire between belligerents.

=== Subsequent history ===
The library was again restored and holds approximately four million books. Since 1970 the collections have been divided between the French-speaking Université catholique de Louvain and Dutch-speaking Katholieke Universiteit Leuven.

The University Library of the Catholic University of Leuven has acquired not only modern books but also many old books and valuable incunabula.

== See also ==
- University Hall (Leuven)
- Universities in Leuven
- Old University of Leuven
- State University of Leuven
- Catholic University of Mechlin
- Katholieke Universiteit Leuven
- Université catholique de Louvain
