= List of colleges of Leuven University =

This is a list of the constituent colleges of the Old University of Leuven (founded 1425; suppressed 1797). Many of them are listed heritage sites and some are in use by the current Katholieke Universiteit Leuven.

== Pedagogies ==
Four of the colleges were specifically teaching colleges for undergraduates in the Liberal Arts, and these were called Pedagogies.

Name	Dutch	French	Latin	Foundation	Founder	Location	Heritage reference
Castle College	De Burcht or Het Kasteel	Collège du Chateau	Paedagogium Castri	1431	Godfrey de Goimpel	Mechelsestraat	demolished
Pig College	Het Varken	Collège du Porc	Paedagogium Porci	1430	Henricus van Loen	Muntstraat	demolished
Lily College	De Lelie	Collège du Lys	Paedagogium Lilii	1431	Charles Viruli	Diestsestraat	demolished
Falcon College	De Valk	Collège du Faucon	Paedagogium Falconis	1546	Jan Stockelpot	Tiensestraat	42155

== Colleges ==
The others provided residential facilities for students studying at the advanced faculties (law, medicine, theology).

Name	Dutch	French	Latin	Foundation	Founder	Location	Heritage reference	Image
Holy Ghost College	Heilige-Geestcollege	Collège du Saint-Esprit	Collegium Sancti Spiritus vel Collegium Theologicum	1442	Louis de Rycke	Naamsestraat	42164	
Saint Ivo's College	Sint-Ivocollege	Collège de Saint-Yves / Collège des Bacheliers	Collegium Sancti Ivonis vel Baccalaureum	1483	Robertus de Lacu	Vanderkelenstraat	42165	
Saint Donatian's College	Sint-Donatuscollege	Collège de Saint-Donat	Collegium Sancti Donatiani	1484	Antoine Hanneron and Jean Carondelet	Sint-Donatuspark	demolished	
Standonck College	Standonckcollege	Collège de Standonck	Collegium Standonicum	1490	Jean Standonck	Hogeschoolplein	42186	
Houterlee College	Houterleecollege	Collège de Houterle	Collegium Houterlaeum	1499	Henricus de Houterlé			
Winckel College		Collège Winckelius	Collegium Winckelianum	1505	Joannes de Winckel			
Arras College	Atrechtcollege	Collège d’Arras	Collegium Atrebatense	1509	Nicolaus Ruterius	Naamsestraat	42153 (1974)	
Collegium Trilingue		Collège des Trois Langues	Collegium Trilingue	1517	Hieronymus van Busleyden	Busleidengang	42159	
Pope's College	Pauscollege	Collège du Pape Adrien VI	Collegium Pontificium Adriani VI	1523	Pope Adrian VI	Hogeschoolplein	42171	
Savoy College	Savoiecollege	Collège de Savoie	Collegium Sabaudicum	1551	Eustace Chapuys			
St Anne's College	Sint-Annacollege	Collège Sainte-Anne	Collegium Sanctae Annae vel Namurcense	1553	Nicolas Goblet	Naamsestraat	42174	
Driutius College		Collège Driutius	Collegium Driutianum	1559	Michel Driutius			
Viglius College	Vigliuscollege	Collège Viglius	Collegium Viglianum	1569	Viglius Zwichemius			
Van Dale College	Van Dalecollege	Collège Van Daele	Collegium Dalense	1569	Petrus Van Dale	Naamsestraat	42175 (1942)	
Craendonck College	Craandonckcollege / Kempisch college	Collège Craendonck	Collegium Craendonck	1571	Marcel Craendonck			
Premonstratensian College	College van Premonstreit	Collège des Prémontrés	Collegium Praemonstratense	1571		Naamsestraat	42157 (1942)	
Divaeus College		Collège Divaeus	Collegium Divaei	1575	Gregorius Divaeus			
Breugel College	Breugelcollege	Collège Breugel	Collegium Bruegelianum	1577	Petrus Breugel			
King’s College	Koningscollege		Collegium Regium seu Seminarium Regium	1579	Philip II of Spain	Naamsestraat	42167	
Pels College	Pelscollege	Collège Pels	Collegium Pelsianum	1584	Joannes Pelts			
Mons College		Collège de Mons	Collegium Montense	1596	Joannes Beviene			
Liège College	College van Luik	Séminaire de Liège	Collegium seu Seminarium Leodiense	1605	Ernest of Bavaria	Muntstraat	42158	
St Anthony's College (Irish Franciscan College)	Klooster der Ierse minderbroeders			1607	Florence Conry	Janseniusstraat	42137	
Bay College	Baiuscollege	Collège de Bay	Collegium Bayanum	1614	Jacobus Baius			
Holland College	Hollands college / College van Haarlem	Collège de Hollande	Collegium Divae Pulcheriae	1617	Philippus Rovenius	Damiaanplein (previously Varkensmarkt)	42166	
College of the Canons Regular	Klooster van de Reguliere kanunniken van Sint-Augustinus van Windesheim	Collège des chanoines réguliers	Collegium Canonicorum Regularium S. Augustini	1618	priors of Groenendael and Bethlehem			
Luxembourg College	Luxemburgcollege	Collège de Luxembourg	Collegium Mylianum	1619	Joannes Mylius	Vaartstraat	42168	
Teutonic College	Duits-Ordecollege	Collège de l’ordre teutonique	Collegium Ordinis Teutonici	1621	Edmund Huyn, commander of Alden Biesen			
Irish College	Iers College	Collège des Hibernois	Collegium pastorale Hibernorum	1623	Eugene Matthews			
St Willebrord's College	Sint-Willibrordscollege / Bossche college	Collège Saint-Willebrord	Collegium Sancti Willebrordi	1625	Nicolaus Zoesius			
Irish Dominican College of Holy Cross	Ierse Predikherencollege	Collège des Dominicains Irlandais / Collège de la Sainte Croix	Collegium Sanctae Crucis	1626				
Aulne College	Aulncollege	Collège d’Aulne	Collegium Alnense	1629	Edmond de Jouvent, abbot of Aulne	Naamsestraat	42154	
Malderus College		Collège Malderus	Collegium Malderi	1633	Johannes Malderus, bishop of Antwerp	Sint-Maartenstraat	42169	
Hovius College		Collège dit le Patrimoine du Christ	Collegium Hovii	1633	Franciscus Hovius			
Trinity College	Heilige Drievuldigheidscollege	Collège de la Sainte-Trinité / Nouveau Collège	Collegium SS. Trinitatis vel Novum Collegium	1657		Oude Markt	42163	
Villers College	Villerscollege	Collège de Villers	Collegium Villariense	1660	Bernardus vander Heck	Vaartstraat	42178	
St Michael's College	Sint-Michielscollege	Collège de Saint-Michel	Collegium Sancti Michaelis	1670	Paulus Hubens and Laurentius Zoenius			
Mechlin College	Mechels college	Collège de Malines	Collegium Provinciae Mechliniensis	1675	Mechelen city council			
	College van de Hoge Heuvel	Collège Alticollense	Collegium SS. Willebrordi et Bonifacii vel Alticollense	1686	Johannes van Neercassel	Naamsestraat	42156	
