= St Anne's College, Leuven =

St Anne's College
- Sint-Annacollege
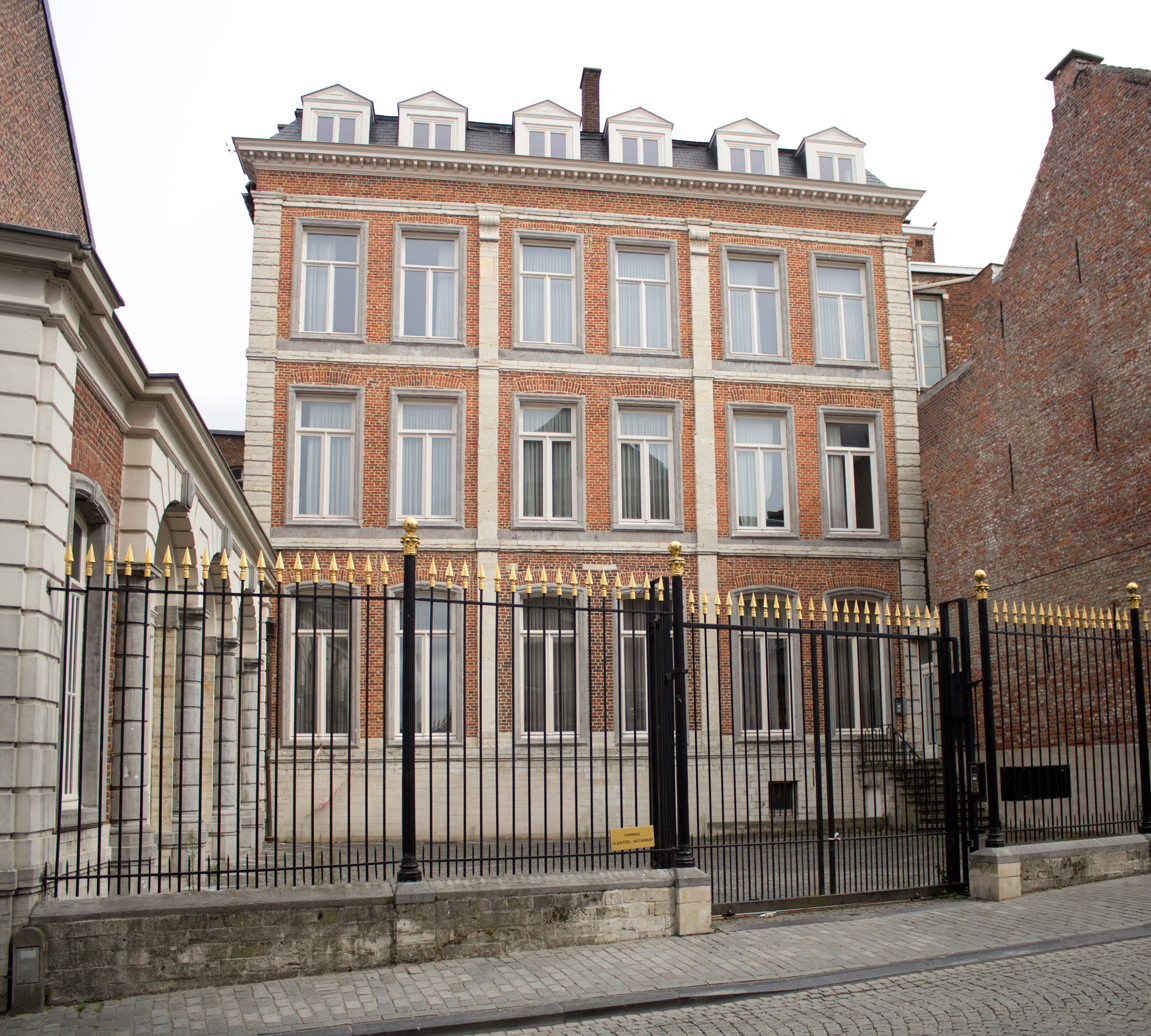
- Type: college
- Active: 1553–1797
- Religious affiliation: Catholic
- Academic affiliation: Old University of Leuven
- Location: Leuven, Belgium; 50°52′37″N 4°42′02″E

St Anne's College was one of the colleges of Leuven University, now listed as built heritage of Flanders, Belgium.

The college was founded in 1553 through a bequest by Nicolas Goblet, licentiate in canon law and provost of the chapter of Notre Dame de Dinant. It was intended to provide accommodation for poor students of philosophy, theology, and law, particularly those from Bouvignes-sur-Meuse or the County of Namur. In 1597 the college moved to a new building, which was extensively renovated in the mid-18th century. The college was closed in 1797 and the building was sold in 1806. It has since then been in private hands and currently houses a notary's office.

== See also ==
- List of colleges of Leuven University
