= Robertus de Lacu =

Professor of canon law

Robert Vande Poele, Latinized Robertus de Lacu (died 1483), a native of Ghent, was a professor at the Old University of Leuven and the founder of Saint Ivo's College there.

== Career ==
Vande Poele was appointed ordinary professor of canon law on 20 June 1463. He also served three terms as rector, in 1463, 1471 and 1476. In 1464 he represented the university in the States of Brabant.

He held canonries at Senlis Cathedral, St. Gummarus Church, Lier, St. Mary's Church, Utrecht (1476), and St Donatian's in Bruges.

Vande Poele died in Leuven on 26 June 1483 and was buried in the church of the Augustinian canons of St Martin. By his last will and testament he founded St Ivo's College, for poor students in the faculty of law.

== Works ==
- Illustrationes institutionum juris (printed by Dirk Martens)
