= Confraternities of the Cord =

Christian pious associations whose members wear a cord, girdle, or cincture

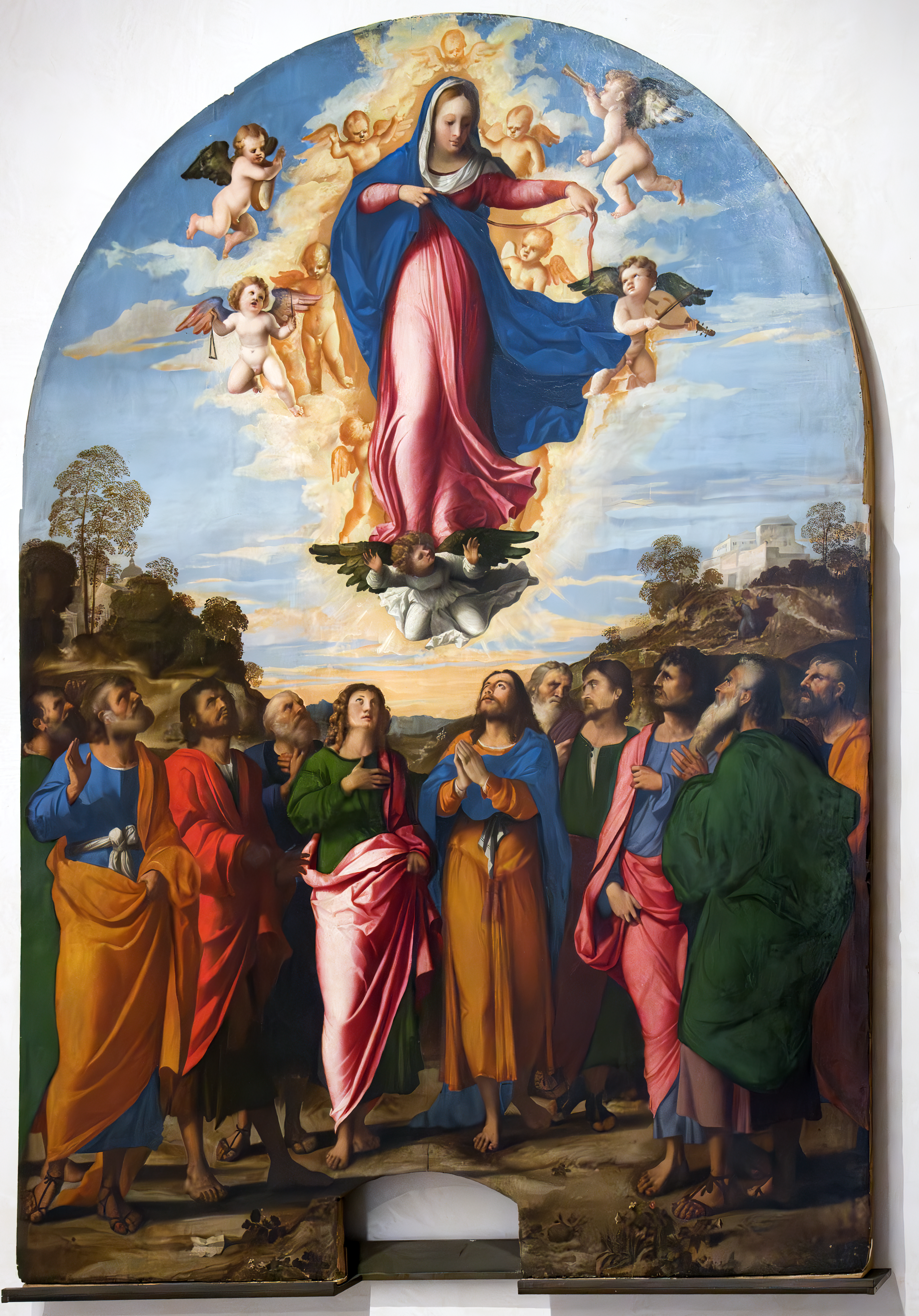
In Catholic belief, the Girdle of Thomas is said to be handed down by the Virgin Mary during her Assumption

The Confraternities of the Cord (Latin: Sacra Confraternita de Cingulum) are pious associations of Christians, the members of which wear a cord, girdle or cincture in honour of a saint or angel whom they wish to honour and emulate. The wearing of this sacramental, according to traditional belief, disposes one to receive grace from God.

== Background ==
In the early church, virgins wore a cincture as a sign purity and hence it has been considered a symbol of chastity as well as of mortification and humility.

The wearing of a cord or cincture in honour of a saint is of very ancient origin. The first mention of it is in the life of Saint Monica who in a vision received a belt from the Virgin Mary, who assured her that she would take under her special protection all those who wore it in her honour.

In the Middle Ages cinctures were also worn by the faithful in honour of saints, though no confraternities were formally established. At a later date, the church introduced blessings of cinctures in honour of the Most Precious Blood, of the Virgin Mary, of Saint Francis of Paola, and Saint Philomena.

Confraternities had their beginnings in the early Middle Ages, and developed rapidly from the end of the twelfth century from the rise of the religious orders. The main object and duty of the confraternities were, above all, the practice of piety and works of charity. There are various confraternities of the Cord, whose members wear a cord as insignia just as members of other confraternities wear a scapular. There are three archconfraternities and one confraternity the members of which wear a cord or cincture. The main aims of the confraternities are to practise prayer, piety and works of charity.

== Archconfraternity of Our Lady of Consolation ==
The oldest and most celebrated of these confraternities of the Cord is probably the Archconfraternity of Our Lady of Consolation, also called the Archconfraternity of the Cincture of Saint Monica, Saint Augustine and Saint Nicholas of Tolentino. The Augustinian friars propagated this particular devotion.

== Archconfraternity of the Cord of Saint Francis ==
After his conversion, Francis of Assisi girded himself with a rough cord in the manner of the poor of his day, and a white cord with three knots came subsequently to form part of the Franciscan habit. According to the Franciscan historian Luke Wadding, Saint Dominic received the cord from Saint Francis when they exchanged their girdles in a sign of friendship. From that day on, Dominic always wore it under his habit out of devotion to his fellow founder.

In his bull Ex supernae dispositionis of 1585, Pope Sixtus V, a Franciscan, erected the Archconfraternity of the Cord of Saint Francis in honor of Christ's passion, in the Basilica of St. Francis in Assisi, enriching it with many indulgences, and conferred upon the minister general of the Order of Friars Minor Conventual the power of erecting confraternities of the cord of Saint Francis in the churches of his order and of aggregating them to the archconfraternity at Assisi. Pope Sixtus, in his bull Divinae caritatis, also granted new indulgences to the archconfraternity and empowered the Minister General of the Friars Minor to erect confraternities of the cord of Saint Francis in the churches of his own order, in those places where there were no conventuals. Pope Paul V, in his bulls Cum certas and Nuper archiconfraternitati revoked all spiritual favours hitherto conceded to the archconfraternity and enriched it with new and more ample indulgences. Both these bulls were confirmed by the brief of Pope Clement X, Dudum felicis in 1673.

Pope Benedict XIII in his constitution Sacrosancti apostolatus of 1724, conceded to the minister general of the conventuals authority to erect confraternities of the cord of Saint Francis in churches not belonging to his own order in those places where there were no Franciscans.

== Archconfraternity of the Cord of Saint Joseph ==
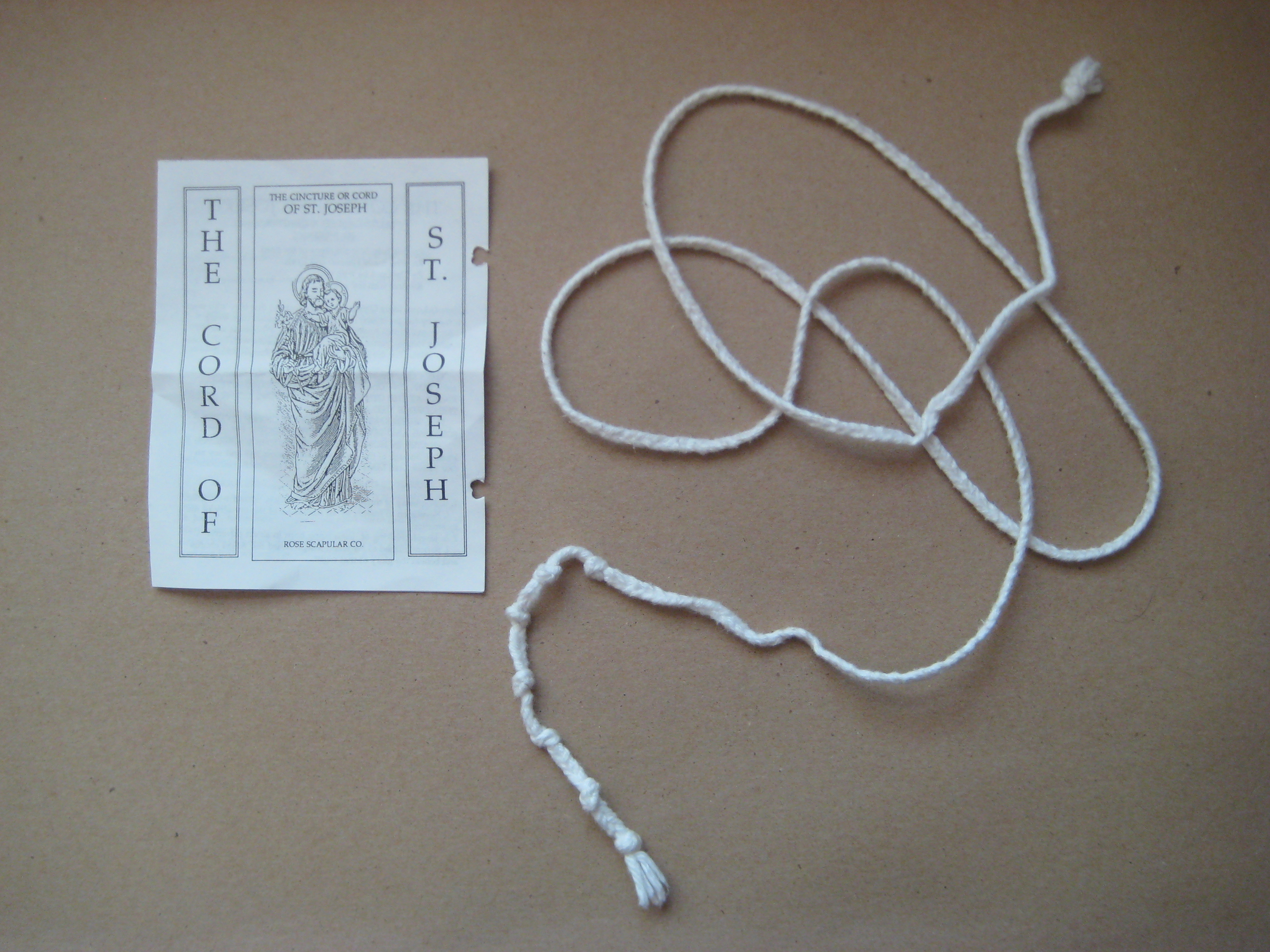
Cord of Saint Joseph with explanatory leaflet

The Archconfraternity of the Cord of Saint Joseph was based at the Church of San Rocco. Confraternities of the Cord of Saint Joseph must be aggregated to the archconfraternity in the Church of St. Roch at Rome in order to enjoy its spiritual favours and indulgences.

The cure of an Augustinian nun at Antwerp in 1657 from a grievous illness, through the wearing of a cord in honour of Saint Joseph, gave rise to the pious practice of wearing it to obtain the grace of purity through his intercession. The devotion soon spread over many countries of Europe, and in the 19th century was revived in the Church of Saint Roch at Rome and in Saint Nicolas at Verona. Pope Pius IX, approved in 1859 a blessing of the cord of Saint Joseph.

== Universal Archconfraternity of Saint Philomena ==
The Universal Archconfraternity of Saint Philomena is an apostolate in which members commit to live "according to the Gospel of Christ with the example of Saint Philomena", spreading devotion to her, and encouraging youth to walk the Christian life.

Members must have read Life of the Young Saint, wear at all times the Cord of Saint Philomena, pray daily the Little Crown of Saint Philomena, and receive Holy Communion on 10 January, 25 May, and the 10th, 11th or 13 August. An indulgence is gained by members who wear the Cord of Saint Philomena on these days, granted that the usual conditions have been fulfilled, including receiving the sacraments of Confession and Eucharist, as well as praying for the Pope's intentions. The Cord of Saint Philomena is made of cotton or wool threads of white and red, representing "faith and the purity of virginity". Members of the Universal who wear the Cord of Saint Philomena will be "preserve[d], chaste and pure, safe from temptation" as it has "the virtue of healing sickness of body and spirit".

The names of those enrolled at a Confraternity of Saint Philomena site must be forwarded to the Universal Archconfraternity of Saint Philomena's headquarters in Glasgow, United Kingdom.

== Confraternity of the Cord of Saint Thomas (Angelic Warfare Confraternity) ==
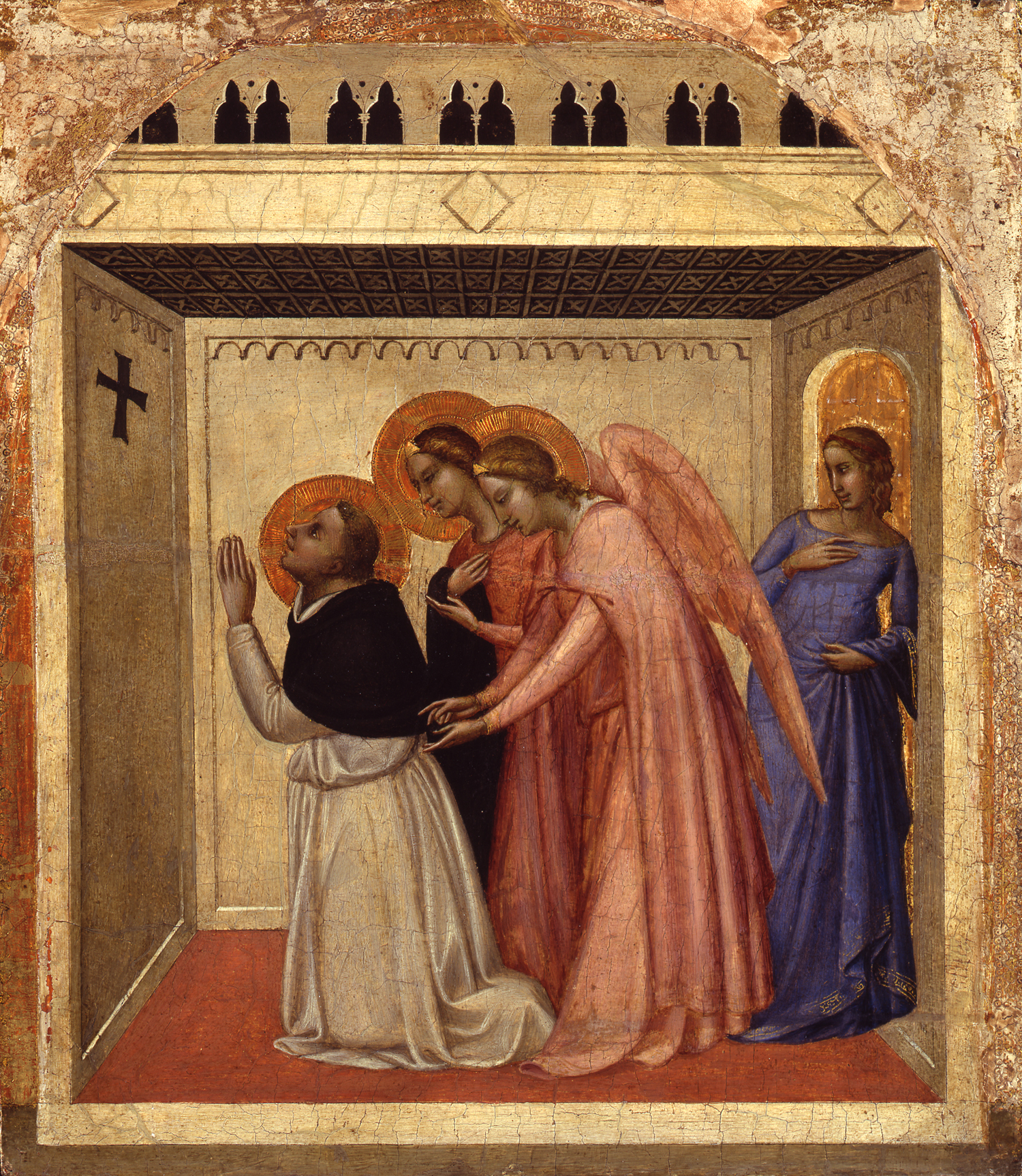
The Temptation of St. Thomas Aquinas, painted by Bernardo Daddi

It is related in the life of Saint Thomas Aquinas that as a reward for his overcoming a temptation against purity, he was girded with a cord by angels and that in consequence, he was never again tempted against this virtue. This cord is still preserved in the church at Chieri, Italy. Soon after the saint's death many of the faithful began to wear a cord in honour of Saint Thomas, to obtain the grace of purity through his intercession.

The first Confraternity of the Cord of Saint Thomas was erected at the Catholic University of Leuven by the Belgian Dominican friar Franciscus Deurweerders in 1649, and numbered among its members all the professors and students of the Faculty of Theology (which has Thomas Aquinas as patron saint) and many of the faithful. Thence it spread to Maastricht, Vienna, and many other cities of Europe. In the 17th century, societies were formed at different universities, the members of which wore a cord in honour of Saint Thomas.

Pope Innocent X sanctioned this new confraternity by a brief dated 22 March 1652. The members are required to have their names enrolled, to wear a cord with fifteen knots or the medal of the confraternity, and to practice some particular devotion to Saint Thomas and Our Lady. One recites, daily, fifteen Hail Marys, in honor of the mysteries of the rosary. This last obligation does not bind under sin. To be received into this confraternity, any Dominican priest can perform the ceremony. Any other priest can perform the ceremony with authorization of the director of the confraternity. The confraternity's indulgences and privileges are contained in the great bull of Pope Benedict XIII, Pretiosus of 1727, and in the decree of the Sacred Congregation of Indulgences.

The encyclical Studiorum Ducem of Pope Pius XI (1923) granted members of the Angeluc Milizia "the privilege of wearing instead of a cord a medal round the neck impressed on the obverse with a picture of St. Thomas and the angels surrounding him with a girdle and on the reverse a picture of Our Lady, Queen of the Most Holy Rosary."

== See also ==
- Archconfraternity
