= State University of Leuven =

University in Leuven (Louvain), Belgium (1817–1835)

Coordinates: 50.8778°N 4.7006°E

- Université d'État de Louvain
- Active: 1817–1835
- Location: Leuven, Province of Brabant, United Kingdom of the Netherlands

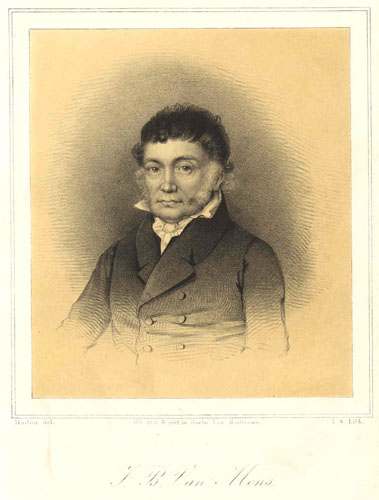
Jean-Baptiste Van Mons, professor at the State University of Leuven.

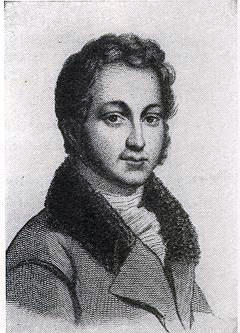
Baron Frédéric de Reiffenberg, member of the Academic Senate and professor at the State University of Leuven.

The State University of Leuven (Dutch: Rijksuniversiteit Leuven) was a university founded in 1817 in Leuven in Belgium, then part of the United Kingdom of the Netherlands. It was distinct from the Old University of Leuven (1425–1797) and from the Catholic University of Leuven, founded in 1834, which moved from Mechlin to Leuven after the State University had been closed in 1835.

== History ==
The State University of Leuven was founded by King William I of the United Kingdom of the Netherlands in 1817 in Leuven. This continued the history of having a major university in Leuven, with the Old University of Leuven having been active from 1425 to 1797, and the State University used the same campus and facilities. A dozen professors that had taught at the Old University taught at the State University, including:

- Xavier Jacquelart, professor at the Old University of Louvain
- Jean Philippe Debruyn, professor at the Old University of Louvain starting 1794.
- Guillaume Joseph van Gobbelschroy, medical graduate, professor at the Old University of Louvain starting 1783.
- Joseph Josse Vandertaelen, medical graduate, professor at the Old University of Louvain
- Jean Ferdinand Sentelet, theology graduate, professor of philosophy at the Pédagogie du Lys and president of the College of Craenendonck, at the Old University of Louvain
- Jan Baptist Liebaert, doctor at the Faculty of Arts of the Old University of Louvain
- Étienne Heuschling, who had been professor of Hebrew at the Old University of Louvain.

Belgium's independence from the Netherlands in 1830/31 plunged the universities into disorder. Attempting to prevent university education from being fragmented, the new government closed Leuven's faculties of law and natural science but backed down due to protests. A proposal to concentrate university education at Leuven was rejected by parliament on 4 August 1835. On 27 September 1835, the state university was officially closed, with most professors moving to the state universities of Ghent and Liège.

Meanwhile, the bishops of Belgium had founded a new university, the Catholic University of Mechlin, in 1834. This provoked serious riots in the cities of Ghent, Leuven and Liège by liberals, who feared the Church encroaching on state education. After the State University had been closed, the Catholic University moved its headquarters to Leuven on 1 December 1835 and then took the name of Catholic University of Leuven, again leading to protests by liberals, particularly due to its efforts to usurp the heritage and identity of the historical Old University of Leuven.

== Buildings ==
The university was housed in former colleges of the former University; St Donatian's, the Premonstratensian College, Maria-Theresia College and the Veteran's College, and King's College, Leuven.

== Faculties and faculty ==
The State University of Leuven counted upon the creation the Faculties of Law, Medicine, Science and Mathematics and of the Natural Philosophy and Letters.

=== Rectores magnifici ===
A professor was named to be the rector magnificus every year.

- 1817–1819: François Joseph Harbauer
- 1819–1820: Jean Ferdinand Sentelet
- 1820–1821: Henri-Ferdinand Decoster
- 1821–1822: Georg Joseph Bekker
- 1822–1823: Charles Jacmart
- 1823–1824: Franz Jacob Goebel
- 1824–1825: Jean-François-Michel Birnbaum
- 1825–1827: Franz-Joseph Dumbeck
- 1827–1828: Jean Marie Baud
- 1828–1829: Franz-Joseph Adelmann
- 1830–1832: Charles Jacmart

=== Secretaries (Graphiarii) ===
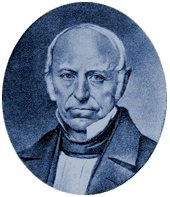
Karl Bernhardi (1799-1874), librarian of the State University of Leuven.

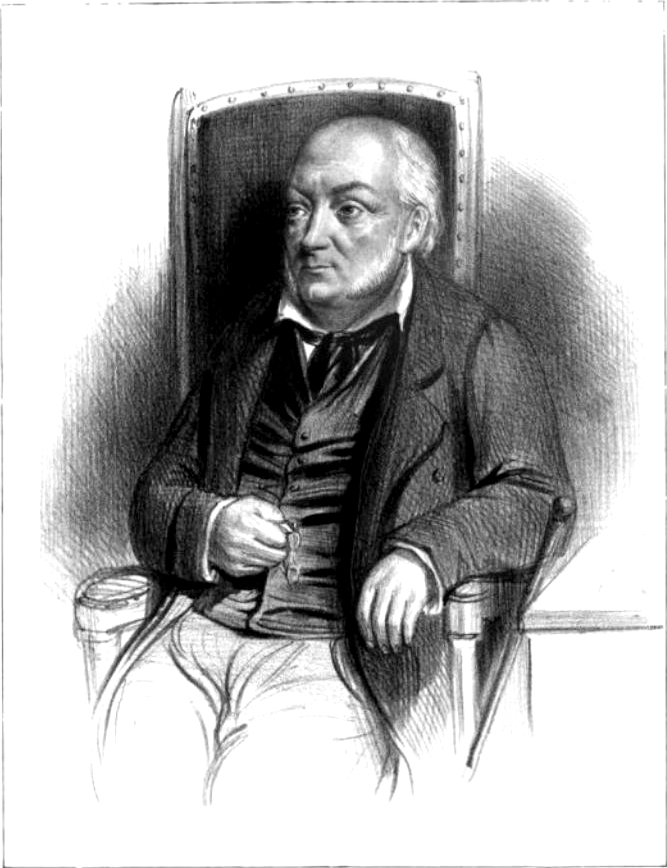
Joseph Jacotot, professor at the State University of Leuven.

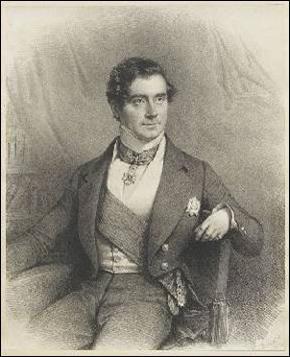
A famous old student of the State University of Leuven: Sylvain Van de Weyer.

- Gerard Jean Meyer, 1825–1826

=== Members of the Academic Senate ===
- Frédéric de Reiffenberg (1795–1850), historian and philosopher, secretary of the Academic Senate.

=== Librarians ===
- Karl Bernhardi
- P. Namur

== Notable alumni ==
- Alexandre Gendebien (1789–1869), liberal politician
- André Dieudonné Trumper (1794–1874), doctor in medicine and Venerable Master of the respectable lodge of the "True Friends of the Union and Progress" at the Orient of Brussels.
- Ferdinand de Meeûs (1798–1861), banker
- Jules René Guérin (1801–1886), physician
- Sylvain van de Weyer (1802–1874), liberal politician
- Augustus Van Dievoet (1803-1865), jurist and historian of the law
- Bernard du Bus de Gisignies (1808–1874), studied law, politician, ornithologist and paleontologist
- Hippoliet Van Peene (1811–1864), physician and playwright, wrote the lyrics of the Flemish anthem "De Vlaamse Leeuw"

== Bibliography concerning the State University of Leuven ==
- 1817-1826: Annales Academiae Lovaniensis, 1821-1827 (1817–1826).
- 1821: Annales Academiae Lovaniensis, 1821: "Discours prononcé le 6 octobre 1817 à l'occasion de l'installation de l'Université par M. le docteur François-Joseph Harbaur, professeur en médecine, nommé recteur magnifique de la même université".
- 1835: J. J. Dodt, Repertorium dissertationum belgicarum, Utrecht, 1835.
- 1837: A. Ferrier, Description historique et topographique de Louvain, Brussels, Haumann, Cattoir and Cie, 1837.
- 1838: Journal historique et littéraire, 1838, p. 88.
- 1842: Joseph-Marie Quérard, La littérature française contemporaine, 1842. Biographical notice of the professor Birnbaum, p. 539.
- 1848: P. Namur, "notes concernant le Repertorium dissertationum belgicarum", in Le bibliophile belge, n° 5, 1848, pp. 115–118.
- 1854: Pierre François Xavier De Ram, Analectes pour servir à l'histoire de l'Université de Louvain, Louvain, 1854, p. 155 (Biography of Xavier Jacquelart).
- 1860: E. Van Even, Louvain monumental..., Louvain, C.-J. Fonteyn, 1860.
- 1884: Léon Vanderkindere, L'université de Bruxelles. Notice historique, Brussels, 1884 (Concerning the State University of Louvain see: p. 9 et 10).
- 1906: Victor Brants, La faculté de droit de l'Université de Louvain à travers cinq siècles (1426-1906) esquisse historique, Louvain, 1906.
- 1917: Hubert Nélis, Inventaire des archives de l'Université de l'État à Louvain, Brussels, Hayez, 1917.
- 1925: Dr. G. Bourgeois, "Un Fumacien oublié: Charles Jacmart, Recteur Magnifique de l'Université de Louvain", in, Nouvelle Revue de Champagne et de Brie, Largentière (Ardèche), 3rd year, 1925, pp. 9 and seq. .
- 1948: Carlo Bronne, L'amalgame ou la Belgique de 1814 à 1830, Brussels, ed. Paul Legrain, s. d.(Concerning the State University of Louvain, see: pp. 269–270).
- 1952: Carlo Bronne, La tapisserie royale, Brussels-Paris, 1952, p. 92.
- 1955: Albert Bruylants, "Les chimistes louvanistes et leur temps", II, "L'École Centrale de la Dyle (1795-1814) et l'Université d'État (1816-1835)", in, Bulletin trimestriel de l'Association des Amis de l'Université de Louvain, n°3, 1955.
- 1964: Jean Jacmart, "Généalogie de la famille Jacmart", in, Recueil de l'Office Généalogique et Héraldique de Belgique, tome XII, Brussels, 1963, p. 114.
- 1967: Florilège des sciences en Belgique, Brussels, Royal Academy of Belgium, 1967, p. 118.
- 1973: B. Borghgraef van der Schueren, De Universiteiten in de Zuidelijke Provincies onder Willem I, Brussels, 1973.
- 1975: "La faculté de droit de l'Université d'État de Louvain", in Jura Falconis, XI, 1975 (3).
- 1986: Mia De Neef, De Faculteit Wijsbegeerte en Letteren van de Rijksuniversiteit te Leuven (1817-1835), non edited thesis, Leuven, KUL, 1986.
- 1986: G. Vanpaemel, "J. B. Van Mons (1765-1842) en het scheikundige-onderwijs aan de Rijksuniversiteit Leuven", in Communications de l'Académie Royale, Classe des Sciences, 48, 1986, n° 4, pp. 87–100.
- 1987: Geertrui Couderé, "De studenten aan de Rijksuniversiteit Leuven (1817-1835)", in Liber amicorum Dr. J. Scheerder, Louvain, 1987, p. 241 à 261.
- 1987: Arlette Graffart, "La matricule de l'Université de Louvain (1817-1835)", in Album Carlos Wyffels, Brussels, 1987, pp. 177–178.
- 1990: Emiel Lamberts and Jan Roegiers, Leuven University, 1425-1985, Louvain, University Press, 1990.
- 1999: Christian Laporte, L'affaire de Louvain: 1960-1968, 1999, p. 26.
- 2008: Philippe et Nadine Quinet-De Saeger, André Dieudonné Trumper, médecin à Bruxelles au XIXe siècle, Brussels, Studia Bruxellae, 2008, p. 47.

== See also ==
- Academic libraries in Leuven
- Collegium Trilingue
- Katholieke Universiteit Leuven
- Louvain-la-Neuve
- Old University of Leuven
- Université catholique de Louvain
- Universities in Leuven
