= Universities in Leuven =

The city of Leuven, in the former Duchy of Brabant, has been the seat of four universities:

- 1425: The University of Leuven (1425–1797) or Studium Generale Lovaniense or Universitas Studiorum Lovaniensis, was founded by the French prince Jean de Valois Bourgogne, Duke John IV of Brabant, with the consent of Pope Martin V. This university was suppressed in 1797, however, many university professors taught at the Catholic University of Louvain which is regarded by many as the continuation of the old university.
- 1817: The State University of Leuven was founded. This university was officially abolished in 1835.
- 1835: The new Catholic University of Mechlin was established in Leuven and took the name of Catholic University of Leuven. The University Faculty which was originally composed almost entirely of clergy was under the direct leadership of the bishops of Belgium. This university was divided into two parts French and Dutch.
- 1919: The Evangelical Theological Faculty was founded. It is a private university offering bachelor's and master's degrees in theology.

== See also ==
- Old University of Leuven
  - Collegium Trilingue
  - Faculty of Theology, Old University of Leuven
- State University of Leuven
- Catholic University of Leuven
- Université catholique de Louvain
  - Louvain-la-Neuve
- Katholieke Universiteit Leuven
  - Academic libraries in Leuven
- Faculty of Theology, Catholic University of Leuven
- List of colleges of Leuven University
