= Josse Le Plat =

Belgian legal scholar

Josse Le Plat (18 November 1732, Mechelen – 6 August 1810, Koblenz) was a legal scholar and law professor at Leuven University.

He favored the reforms that Maria Theresa and later Joseph II wanted to make in higher education. In 1779, he published the Canons and Decrees of the Council of Trent, with preface, notes and variants.

== Works ==
- Dissertatio canonica de sponsalibus & matrimoniorum impedimentis (1783) available at KU Leuven Special Collections.
- Academiæ Lovaniensis adumbratio compendiaria (Liège, J.F. Leunckens, 1786) available at KU Leuven Special Collections.
