= Rudolph of Beringen =

15th century professor/parson

Rudolph of Beeringen or Rudolph of Erps (active 1420–1459) was a 15th-century professor at the University of Louvain. He was probably from Beringen, and served as parson of Erps. On 23 July 1420 he matriculated at the University of Heidelberg, giving his state in life as parish priest of Erps in the diocese of Cambrai. He matriculated at the same time as Jean Pipenpoy, monk of Affligem abbey. Both graduated Bachelor of Canon Law on 12 May 1422, and Licentiate of Canon Law on 20 April 1425.

In 1426, Rudolph matriculated at the newly founded University of Louvain. On 8 June 1427, he was appointed to teach canon law, for an annual salary of 60 florins. Two years later he left the university, returning on 8 October 1440, with a doctorate, to be appointed professor of canon law. He died on 4 October 1459 and was buried in St. Peter's Church, Leuven.
