= Premonstratensian College, Leuven =

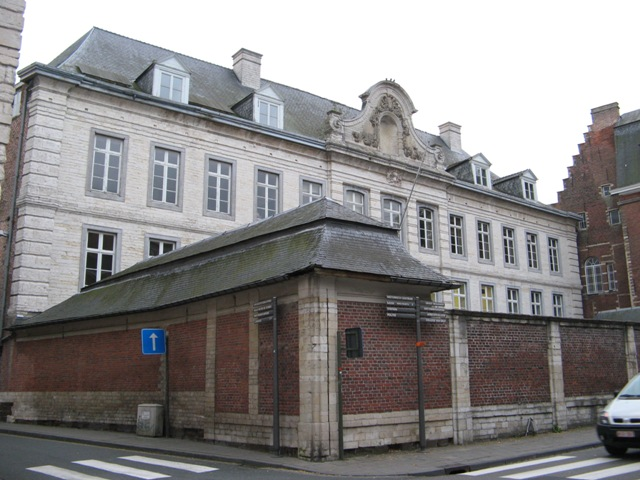

Premonstratensian College (est. 1571) was a house of studies of the Premonstratensian Order at the Old University of Leuven that later housed the Physics Institute of the Catholic University of Leuven. The façade at Naamsestraat 61 was listed as a public monument in 1942 and the building as a whole in 2009.

== History ==
The college was founded jointly by the abbots of the Norbertine abbeys of Averbode, Park, Grimbergen and Ninove for the training of the order's theologians. It was housed in what had been the refugium of Grimbergen Abbey, and formally inaugurated at Christmas 1573. By the mid-18th century the original building was no longer fit for purpose and was replaced with a new building in 1753–1755, probably designed by Grégoire Godissart (1708–1780), a lay brother of Averbode Abbey. After the suppression of the university in 1797, during the French period the building was briefly used as a barracks, a law court and a hospital. From 1818 it housed the natural history collections of the newly founded State University of Leuven, and later became the Physics Institute of the Catholic University of Leuven and then the KU Leuven.
