= Vincenzo Candido =

Vicar general of the Dominican Order

Vincenzo Candido (1573–1654), baptised Mario, was a vicar general of the Dominican Order.

== Life ==
Candido was born in Syracuse, Sicily, on 11 February 1573, to Giuseppe Candido and Agata Ursie. He entered the Dominican Order in 1594 at the Roman convent of Santa Maria sopra Minerva taking the name Vincenzo. He completed his novitiate and studies and becoming a doctor of theology at the College of Saint Thomas, the future Pontifical University of Saint Thomas Aquinas, Angelicum. He served as provincial of Sicily, 1609–1611. He taught philosophy and theology in the Dominican house of studies attached to the University of Camerino, 1611–1617, and became penitentiary of the Basilica di Santa Maria Maggiore in Rome in 1617. He was appointed rector of the College of Saint Thomas in Rome in 1630. Candido presided over the translation of the Bible into Arabic. In 1633 he was elected provincial of the Roman province of his order, and in 1642 vicar general. He was head of the order from the deposition of Niccolò Ridolfi as Master of the Order of Preachers in 1642 to the election of Tommaso Turco in 1644.

Candido was part of the commission that condemned Jansenism. In 1643 he was one of a number of theologians asked to examine Antoine Arnauld's treatise De la fréquente communion, expressing himself in favour of the work's soundness. Candido's own Disquisitionibus moralibus (1643) was later accused of laxism.

He died in Rome on 7 November 1654.

== Works ==
- Illustriorum disquisitionum moralium (4 vols., Rome, 1637–1643)
