= Frédéric de Reiffenberg =

Belgian writer, historian-medievalist and linguist

Frédéric Auguste Ferdinand Thomas de Reiffenberg
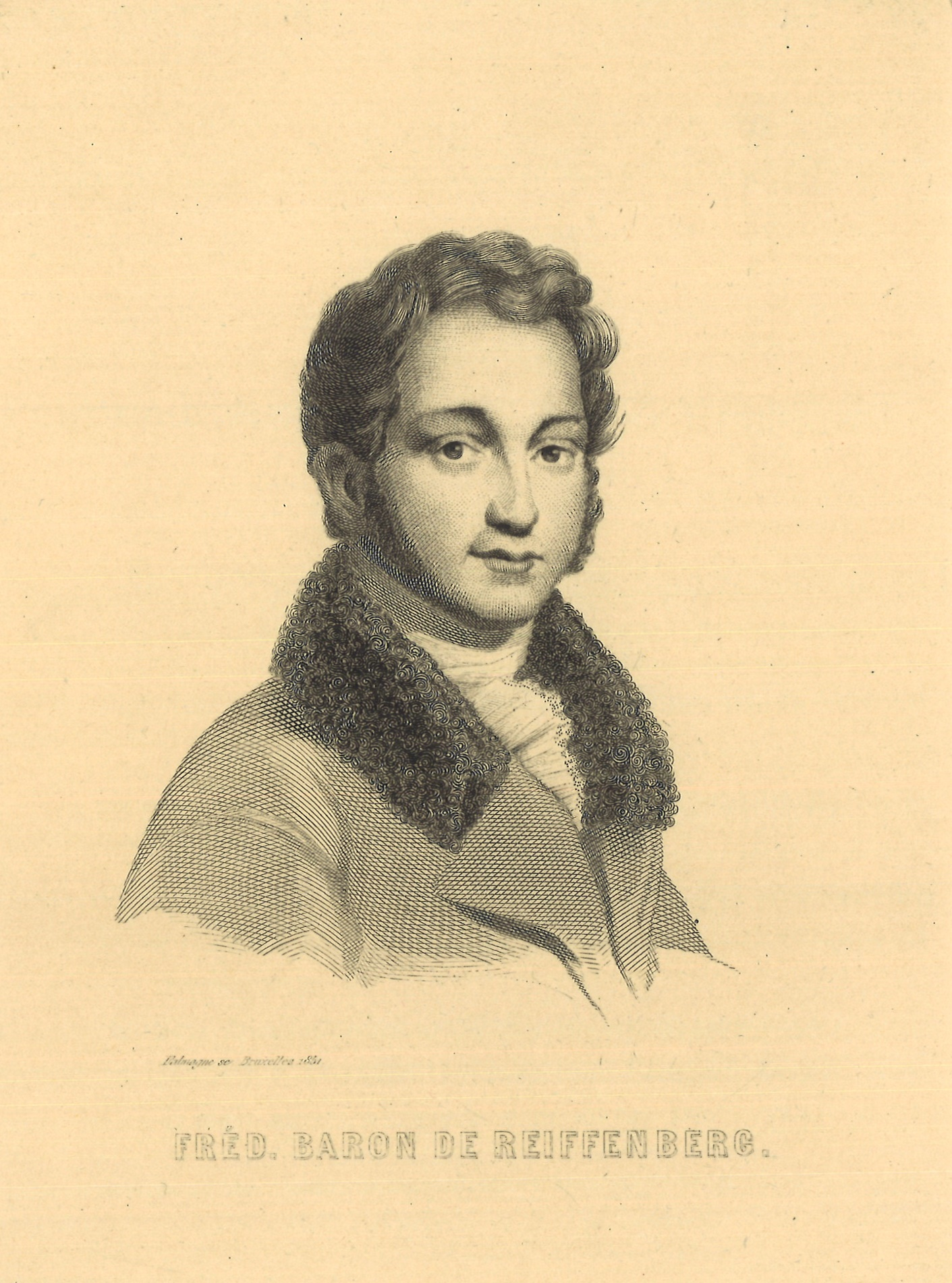
- Born: 19 November 1795; Mons
- Died: 18 April 1850 (aged 54); Saint-Josse-ten-Noode

Academic work
- Discipline: Historian

Frédéric Auguste Ferdinand Thomas de Reiffenberg (14 November 1795 — 18 April 1850) was a baron, Belgian writer, historian-medievalist, and linguist. He was also a member of the Royal Academy of Science, Letters and Fine Arts of Belgium, as well as a member of the Academic Senate and professor at the State University of Leuven.

== Biography ==
Reiffenberg was professor of philosophy at the State University of Leuven from 1822, and gave lectures on medieval history at the University of Liège from 1835. Accused of plagiarism, he was almost deprived of his chair, was dismissed from the examination board and left Liège. In 1837, his friends got him appointed curator of the newly created Royal Library of Belgium. He became one of the most active members of the Royal Academy of Science, Letters and Fine Arts of Belgium. He was also a member of the Institut de France.

His son, Frédéric Guillaume de Reiffenberg, was a writer, poet, and playwright. He wrote poems, drama plays, critical sketches, novels, articles, and books on military administration.

== Selected works ==
- «Archives philologiques» (Brussels, 1825—1826),
- «Archives pour l’histoire civile et littéraire des Pays-Bas» (Leuven, 1827—1828),
- «Nouvelles archives historiques» (1829—1832),
- «Histoire de l’ordre de la Bibliothèque royale» (1840—1850),
- «Bulletin du bibliophile belge» (1845).
