= Petrus Stockmans =

Belgian writer

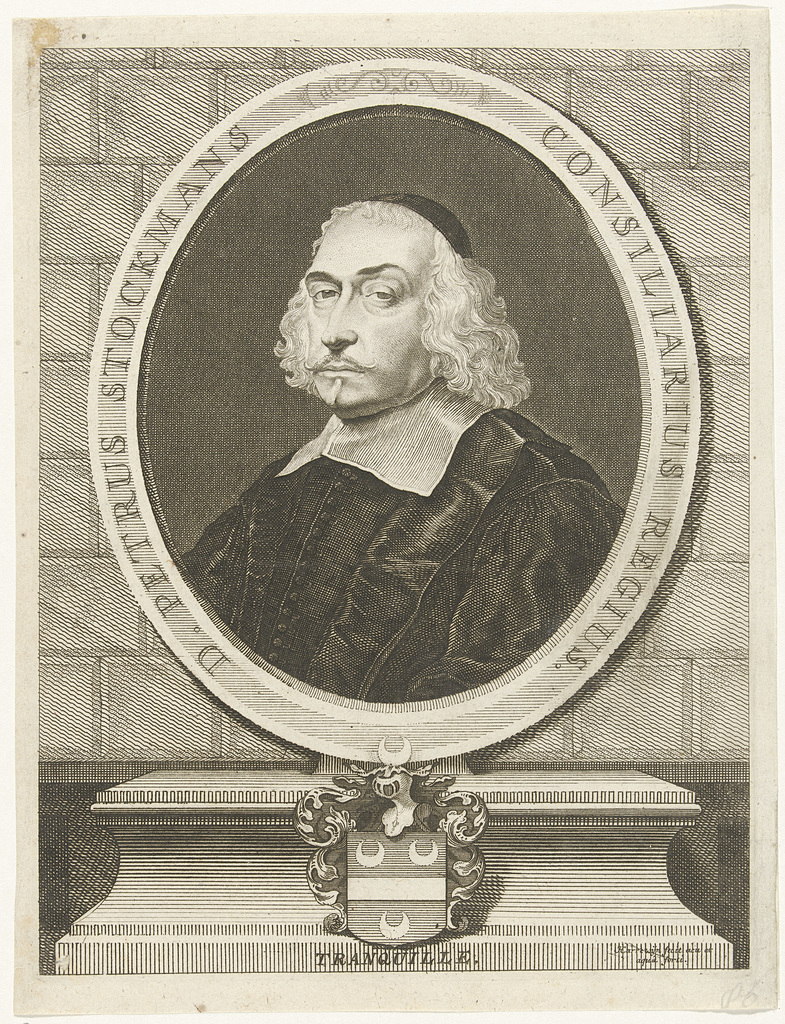
- Stockmans, engraved by Jacobus Harrewijn
- Born: 3 September 1608; Antwerp, Spanish Netherlands
- Died: 7 May 1671 (aged 62); Brussels, Spanish Netherlands

Petrus Stockmans (Antwerp, 1608 - Brussels, 1671) was a legal advisor, a university professor, Latin-language writer and Hellenist from the Spanish Netherlands.

== Works ==
- Deductio ex qua probatur clarissimis argumentis, non esse ius deuolutionis in Ducatu Brabantiae, nec in aliis Belgii prouinciis, ratione principum earum, prout quidam conati sunt asserere
- Jus Belgarum circa bullarum pontificiarum receptionem, Leodii: apud Sebastianum Creel, 1645 and 1647 available at KU Leuven Special Collections.
- Defensio Belgarum contra evocationes et peregrina judicia, etc., Leodii: apud Sebastianum Creel, 1665
  - Defensio Belgarum contra evocationes et peregrina judicia, etc., Leodii: apud Sebastianum Creel, 1665.
- Deductio ex qua clarissimis argumentis probatur contra Gallos non esse ius devolutionis in ducatu Brabantiae; nec in aliis Belgii provinciis, ratione principum eorum, prout quidam illorum conati sunt asserere. Das ist: deductions-schrifft in welcher wider die Frantzosen mit sonnenklaren grunden bewiesen wird. Dass derselben konige in dem hertzogthumb Brabant und andern Niederlandischen provincien kein recht der devolution oder heimfallung habe wie ihrer etliche zu behaupten sich unterstanden, S.l.: s.n., 1667
- Deductio ex qua probatur clarissimis argumentis, non esse jus devolutionis in ducatu Brabantiae, nec in aliis Belgi provinciis, ratione principum earum, prout quidam conati sunt afferre, Amstelodami : apud Petrum Le Grand, 1667
- Tractatus de jure devolutionis, authore D. Petro Stockmans, Amstelodami: apud Petrum Le Grand, 1667-1668, and Brussel, 1668 available at KU Leuven Special Collections
- Clarissimi Petri Stockmans Opera quotquot hactenus seperatim edita fuere omnia, nunc primum in vnum corpus collecta & emendatiora prodeunt, Bruxellis : typis Judoci de Grieck, apud portam lapideam, sub signo S. Huberti, 1686
- Clarissimi ac amplissimi viri d. Petri Stockmans Opera omnia, quotquot hactenus separatim edita fuere nunc primum in unum corpus collecta & emendatiora prodeunt, Bruxellis : apud Judocum de Grieck, apud Portam lapideam, sub signo S. Huberti. Apud Franciscum Serstevens, prope Templum pp. praedicatorum, 1700
