= Karl Bernhardi =

German librarian and politician

Karl Christian Sigismund Bernhardi
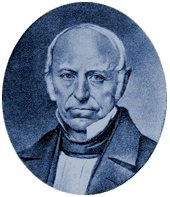
- Karl Bernhardi
- Born: October 5, 1799; Ottrau, Germany
- Died: August 1, 1874 (aged 74); Kassel, Germany
- Education: University of Marburg; State University of Leuven
- Occupations: Librarian; Politician
- Employer: Kassel State Library
- Known for: Sprachkarte von Deutschland (1844); Successor to Jakob Grimm at Kassel State Library

Karl Christian Sigismund Bernhardi (5 October 1799, Ottrau – 1 August 1874, Kassel) was a German librarian and politician.

He studied theology at the University of Marburg, and afterwards worked as a private tutor in Brussels. He furthered his education at the State University of Leuven, where he subsequently received the post of university librarian. In 1829 he relocated to Kassel as successor to Jakob Grimm at the Kassel State Library.

In Kassel he was deeply involved with political, social and cultural concerns. In 1834, he co-founded the Anstalt zur Erziehung armer und verwahrloster Knaben, an institution that dealt with the education of underprivileged youth. He was an editor of the liberal newspaper Der Verfassungsfreund, and in 1834, was co-founder of the Vereins für hessische Geschichte und Landeskunde (Association for Hessian history and regional studies). From 1835 to 1840, he served as director of the Kassel citizens' committee and in 1848, was elected to the Frankfurt Parliament. The eponymous Karl-Bernhardi-Strasse, located behind the Fridericianum in Kassel, is named in his honor.

In 1844, he published a "language map" of Germany, Sprachkarte von Deutschland (2nd edition, 1849 with Wilhelm Stricker) — a work that helped spark interest in the linguistic study of German dialects. His other noteworthy publications include:

- Wegweiser durch die deutschen Volks- und Jugendschriften (with August Lüben), 1852 – Guide to German popular and young peoples' writings.
- Die Sprachgrenze zwischen Deutschland und Frankreich, 1871 – The language border between Germany and France.

Bernhardi was the author of numerous articles in the Allgemeine Deutsche Biographie.
