= Old University of Leuven =

University in Leuven (1425–1797)

University of Leuven
- Universiteit Leuven; Université de Louvain
- Coat-of-arms of the old University of Louvain
- Latin: Studium Generale Lovaniense; Academia Lovaniensis; Universitas Lovaniensis
- Active: 1425–1797
- Location: Leuven, Duchy of Brabant

The Old University of Leuven is the name historians give to the university, or studium generale, founded in Leuven, Brabant (then part of the Burgundian Netherlands, now part of Belgium), in 1425. The university was closed in 1797, a week after the cession to the French Republic of the Austrian Netherlands and the principality of Liège (jointly the future Belgium, by and large) by the Treaty of Campo Formio.

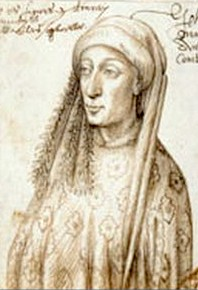
Jean de Bourgogne (John IV, Duke of Brabant), founder of the University of Louvain in 1425: Primus Academiae Conditor fuit Ioannes Quartus, Lotharingiae, Brabantiae, et Limburgiae Dux, Marchio Sacri Imperii.

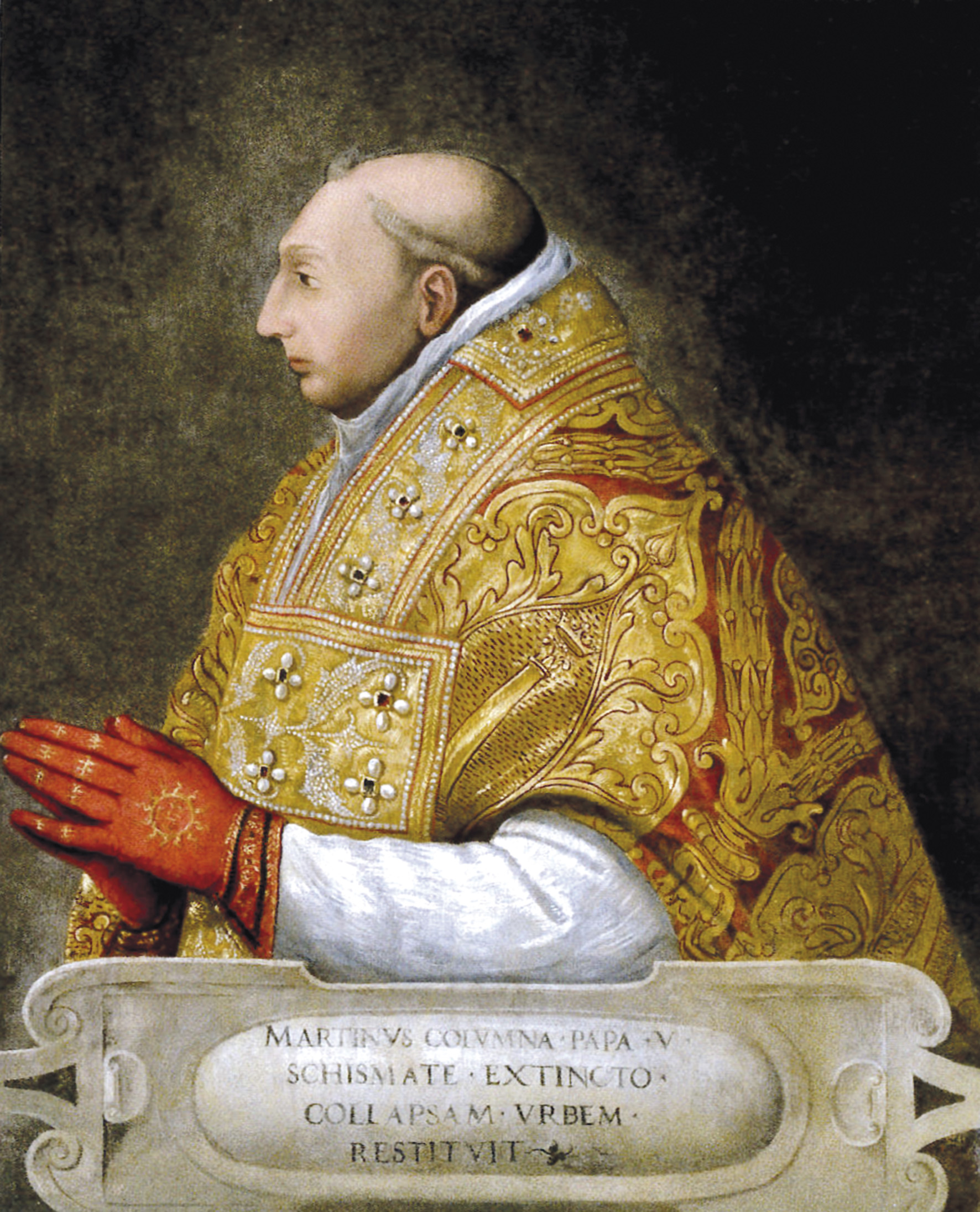
Portrait of the Pope Martin V, author of the bulla confirming on December 9, 1425, the creation of the University of Louvain: à Johanne IV. Brabantiae Duce An. 1425. fundata et à Martino V. P. M. [pontifex maximus] An. seq. 5. Id. dec. Confirmata (Founded by John IV, Duke of Brabant, in the year 1425 and confirmed by Martin V, Supreme Pontiff, in the following year on the 5th day before the Ides of December (December 9th).

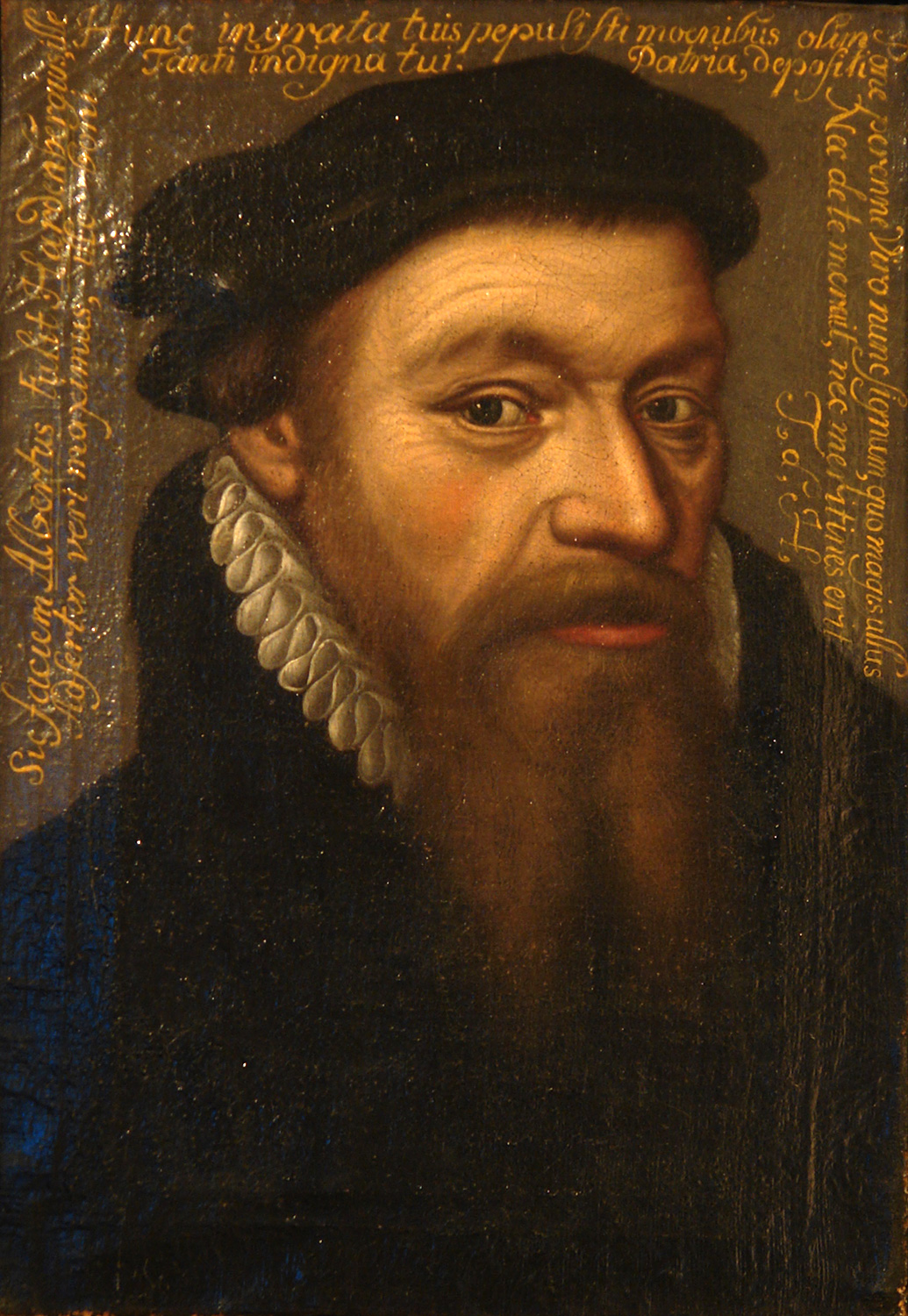
Albertus Risaeus (1510–1574), participated in the pro-Protestant movement at the University of Louvain. He fled to the United Provinces.

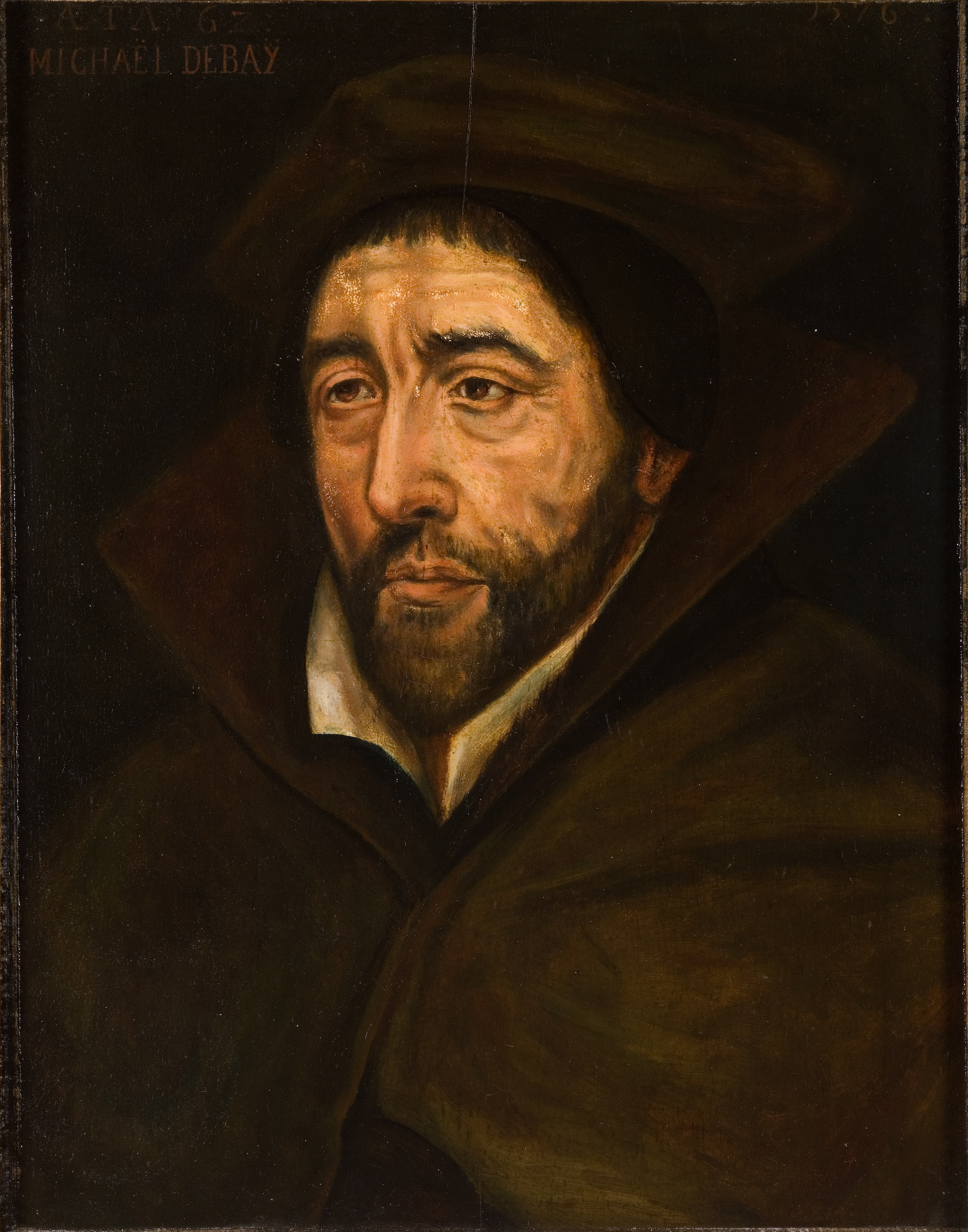
Michel de Bay (Michaël Baius) (1513–1589), professor and rector of the University of Louvain, founder of the doctrine of "Baïanisme", precursor of Jansenism.

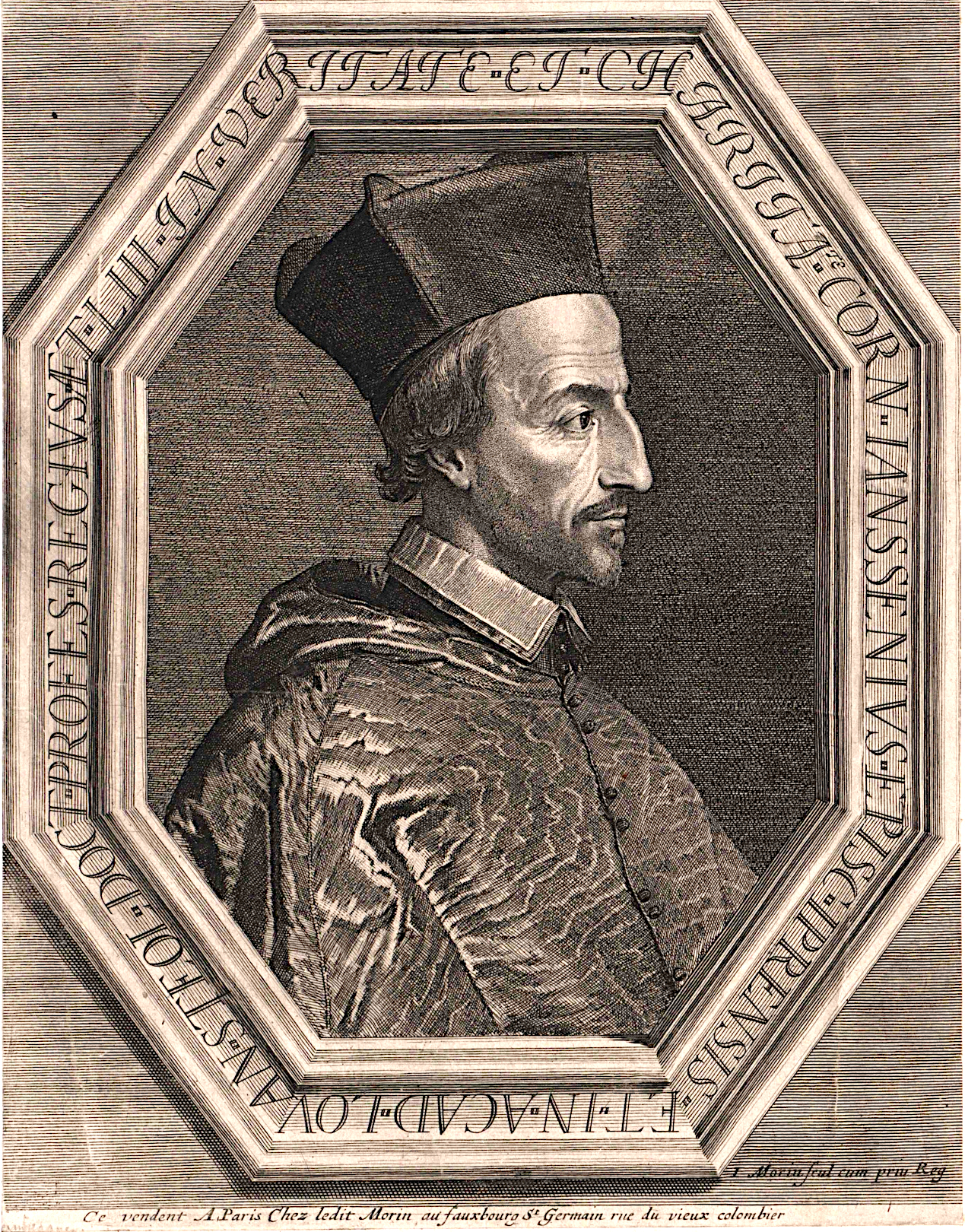
Cornelius Jansen, the father of Jansenism and a rector and professor of the old University of Leuven.

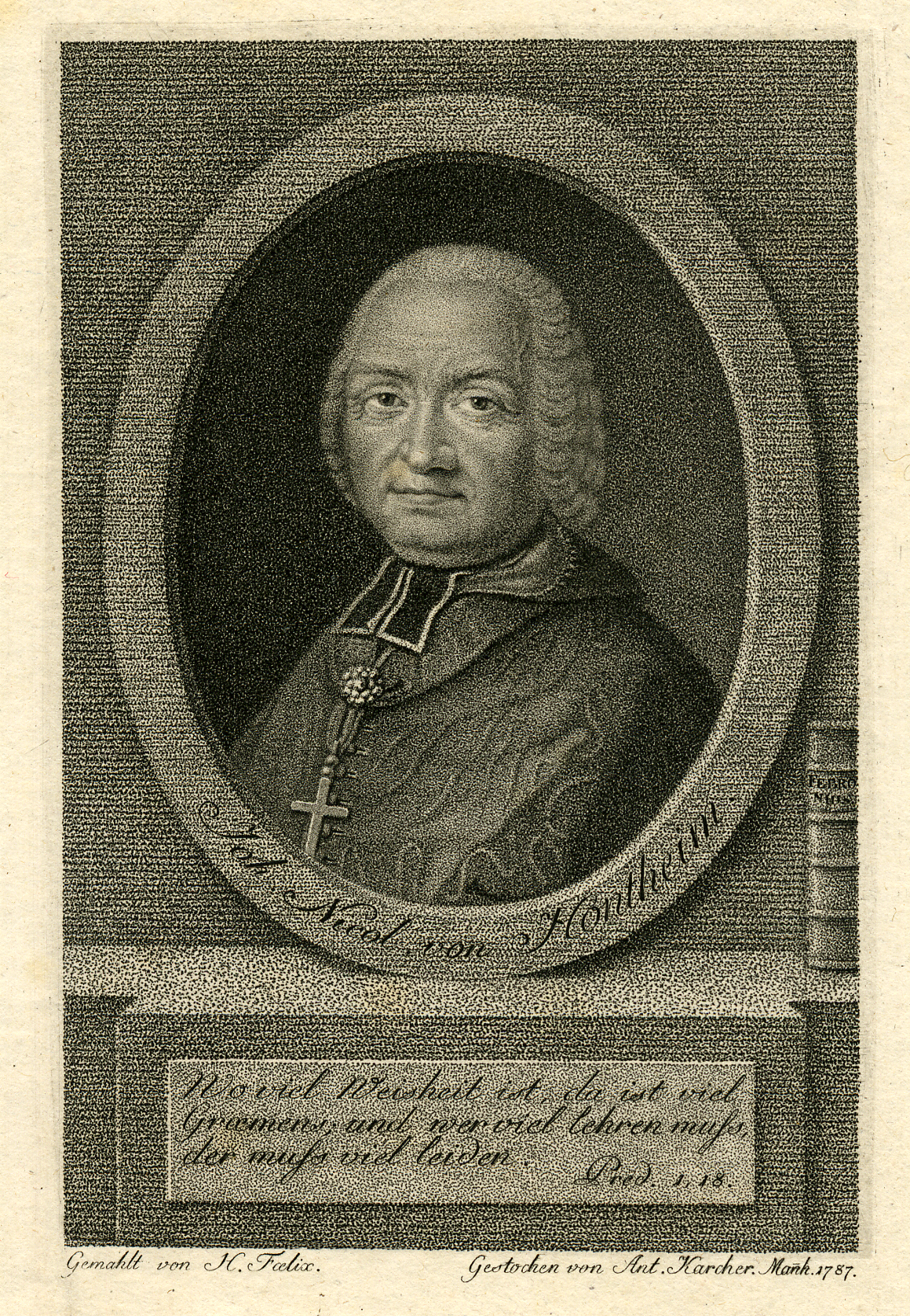
Febronius (Johann Nikolaus von Hontheim) (1701–1790), founder of Febronianism.

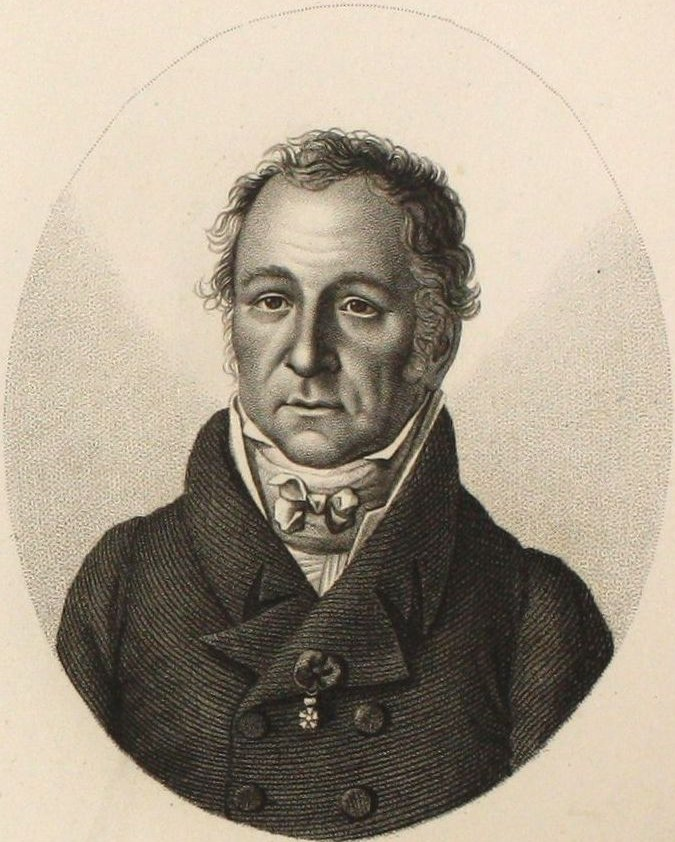
Charles Lambrechts (1753–1825), professor of canon law (1777), rector of the University of Louvain in 1786 and freemason member of the lodge "the true and perfect Harmony" in Mons and Minister of Justice of the French Republic from 3 Vendémiaire year VI to 2 Thermidor year VII (24 September 1797 – 20 July 1799).

The name was in medieval Latin Studium generale Lovaniense or Universitas Studii Lovaniensis, in humanistical Latin Academia Lovaniensis, and most usually, Universitas Lovaniensis, in Dutch Universiteyt Loven and also Hooge School van Loven.

It is commonly referred to as the University of Leuven or University of Louvain, sometimes with the qualification "old" to distinguish it from the Catholic University of Leuven (established 1835 in Leuven). This might also refer to a short-lived but historically important State University of Leuven, 1817–1835.

== History ==
In the 15th century the civil administration of the town of Leuven, with the support of John IV, Duke of Brabant, a prince of the House of Valois, made a formal request to the Holy See for a university.

Pope Martin V issued a papal bull dated 9 December 1426 founding the University in Leuven as a Studium Generale. This university was institutionally independent of the local ecclesiastical hierarchy.

From the founding of the university to its abolition in 1797, Latin was the sole language of instruction.

In its early years, this university was modelled on those of Paris, Cologne and Vienna. The university flourished in the 16th century due to the presence of famous scholars and professors, such as Adriaan Florenszoon Boeyens (Pope Adrian VI), Desiderius Erasmus, Johannes Molanus, Joan Lluís Vives, Andreas Vesalius and Gerardus Mercator.

In 1519, the Faculty of Theology of Leuven, jointly with that of the University of Cologne, became the first institution to condemn a number of statements drawn from Martin Luther's Ninety-five Theses (preceding the papal bull Exsurge Domine by several months).

After the French Revolutionary Wars, by the Treaty of Campo Formio signed on 17 October 1797, the Austrian Netherlands were ceded in perpetuity to the French Republic by the Holy Roman Emperor Francis II, in exchange for the Republic of Venice. Once formally integrated into the French Republic, a law dating to 1793 mandating that all universities in France be closed came into effect. The University of Leuven was abolished by decree of the Département of the Dyle on 25 October 1797.

What remained of the university's movables and books were requisitioned for the École centrale in Brussels. This was the immediate official and legal successor and inheritor of the old University, under the laws in force at the time. It was in turn closed down in 1802.

== Cultural role and influence ==
During the seventeenth and eighteenth centuries, the University of Leuven was until its closure a great centre of Jansenism in Europe. To shake off this reputation, the faculty of theology thrice declared its adherence to the papal condemnation of Jansenist beliefs in the papal bull Unigenitus (1713) but without effect. The University of Louvain, with Baïus and Jansenius, the cradle of Jansenism and remained, during the 17th and 18th centuries until its closure, the bastion and the hub of Augustinian theology known as Jansenism, in Europe, with professors like Jansenius, Petrus Stockmans, Johannes van Neercassel, Josse Le Plat and especially the famous Van Espen and his disciple Febronius, and as Henri Francotte says: "Jansenism reigned supreme at the University of Louvain".

This fidelity to the spirit of Van Espen remained alive in the University of Louvain until its abolition in 1797, as evidenced by what Charles Lambrechts wrote in 1818, former rector magnificus and successor to the chair of canon law of Van Espen : "The encroachments of the Catholic clergy and their claims were so vexatious that, at a time when their religion was dominant, no other remedy had been found for their abuse of power except the appeals in question. This is what prompted the famous Van Espen to write, at the age of eighty, his treatise De recursu ad principem, in order to put a barrier against the ever-recurring abuses of clerical jurisdictions; but this virtuous ecclesiastic, who distributed to the poor all the revenues of the chair of canon law which he occupied at the University of Louvain, was soon obliged to have recourse to appeal as an abuse for himself; still, this remedy could not save him entirely from the persecution of intolerant priests. Loaded with years, glory and infirmities, he was compelled to seek shelter in Holland from their vexations; he soon died in Amsterdam in feelings of piety and resignation, after having employed his life in defending the discipline and customs of the primitive church, of which he was the most zealous supporter".

== Subsequent institutions ==
The first attempt to found a successor university in the nineteenth-century was the secular State University of Leuven, 1817–1835, where a dozen professors of the old University taught. This was followed by a private Catholic university, the Catholic University of Leuven, established in Leuven in 1835 (initially the Catholic University of Mechlin, 1834–1835). This institution was founded with the intention of restoring the confessionally Catholic pre-Revolutionary traditions of learning in Leuven. In 1968 this split to form the two current institutions: the Dutch language Katholieke Universiteit Leuven and the French language Université catholique de Louvain.

== Library ==
From the founding of the university in 1425 up until 1636, there was no official library of the university. Very likely the students had access to manuscripts and printed books preserved in the homes of their professors or colleges.

In 1636, however, a university library was founded in the Cloth hall, previously the seat of the cloth weavers' guild, and was enlarged in 1725 in a baroque style.

This library, with its various additions, was transferred in 1797 by Charles Antoine de La Serna Santander to the Central School, the official continuation of the old university. Wauthier, head of office of the department of Dyle and the ex-Jesuit De la Serna Santander, librarian of the Central School of Brussels, were responsible for the application of this measure. On October 26, 1797, they went with Michel-Marcel Robyns, receiver of national domains, to the municipal administration of Louvain, to notify it, while its most precious works and manuscripts were deposited in Paris among the national treasures of the National Library.

It is also very likely that on the occasion of the troubles of the wars of this time, many precious works and documents surreptitiously followed an unofficial route, sometimes with the high aim of saving them from disaster, sometimes with the goal of profiting from it.

In 1797, much of what remained of this library was sent to the Central School of Brussels, established as the official replacement of the abolished university, although its most precious books and manuscripts were deposited in Paris at the National Library of France. The library of the Central School of Brussels came to number about 80,000 volumes, which later became part of the Library of Brussels, and then the Royal Library of Belgium.

When invading German forces burned the library of the Catholic University of Leuven at the beginning of the First World War, but this library did not contain the books and archives of the old university, or of the State University, but only those of the 19th-century founded Catholic University of Leuven.

== Archives ==
The rich archives of the old University of Leuven, after its suppression by the law of the French Republic, so as all the other universities of the French Republic, were transferred to a "Commission in charge of the management of the goods of the abolished university in Leuven", set up in 1797 and active until 1813. They passed to the National Archives of the United Kingdom of the Netherlands and ultimately to the National Archives of Belgium.

Although the archives of the old University of Leuven have been recognized as world heritage by inclusion on the Memory of the World International Register by UNESCO, until today there is no complete history of the old University of Leuven.

== List of colleges ==
Chronological list of colleges by foundation, the oldest 4 (Castle/Pork/Lely and Faulcon) were considered as Grand College. in the early 18th century there were 18 colleges.

	Foundation	Name	Remarks
1.	1431	Grand College de Burcht	founded by Godfrey de Goimpel
2.	1430	Grand College het Varken	foundation by Henri de Loë
3.	1493	Grand College de Lelie	foundation by Charles Viruli
4.	1546	Grand College de Valk	foundation by Guillaume Everaerts
5.	1442	Grand College of Theology	Foundation by Louis de Rycke
6.	1662	Minor College of Theology	
7.	1483	College of Saint-Yvo	Foundation by Robert van den Poele
8.	1484	College of Saint-Donatian	Foundation by Antoine Haveren
9.	1499	Houterlé-College	Foundation by Henry of Houterlé
10.	1504	Winckele-College	Foundation by Jean de Winckele
11.	1509	Arras-College	Foundation by Nicolas Ruistere
12.	1490	Standonck-College	Foundation by Jean Standonck
13.		Three Tongues-College	Foundation by Jerome of Buyslede
14.	1523	Pontifical College	Foundation by Adrian VI
15.	1535	Saint-Anne's College	Foundation by Nicolas Goublet
16.	1551	Savoye's College	Foundation by Eustace Chapuys
17.	1559	Druite College	Foundation by Michel Druite
18.	1569	van Daele's College	Foundation by Peter van Daele
19.	1569	Viglius' College	Foundation by Viglius ab Aytta Zuichemus
20.	1574	Craendonck College	Foundation by Marcel Craendock

== Related people ==
=== List of chancellors ===
Chronological list of chancellors.

	Begin	End	Name	Remarks
1.	1426	1477	Guillaume van de Noot d'Assche	Dean of St-Peters in Leuven
2.	1477	1487	Dominic de Bassadonis	Dean of St-Peter
3.	1487	1509	Nicolas de Ruistere	Arch-deacon of Brabant
4.	1509	1532	Conrard von Ghingen	Herzog von Brunswick
5.	1532	1593	Rogier, prinz von Taxis	Protonotary in Antwerp
6.	1593	1619	Georg of Austria	Grandson of the emperor Maximilian
7.	1619	1634	Gajus Anthoine Hopperus	
8.	1634	1659	François-Jean de Robles	bishop of Ypres
9.			de Spinola	
10.		1666	Charles Hovius	President of the Privy Council
11.	1666		don Eugenio de Velasco	
12.		1692	Ferdinand-François de Trazignies	Bishop of Tournay
13.	1692	1734	Alexius-Antoine, Prince of Nassau-Siegen	Titular Archbisshop of Trapezopolis

=== Notable professors in chronological order ===
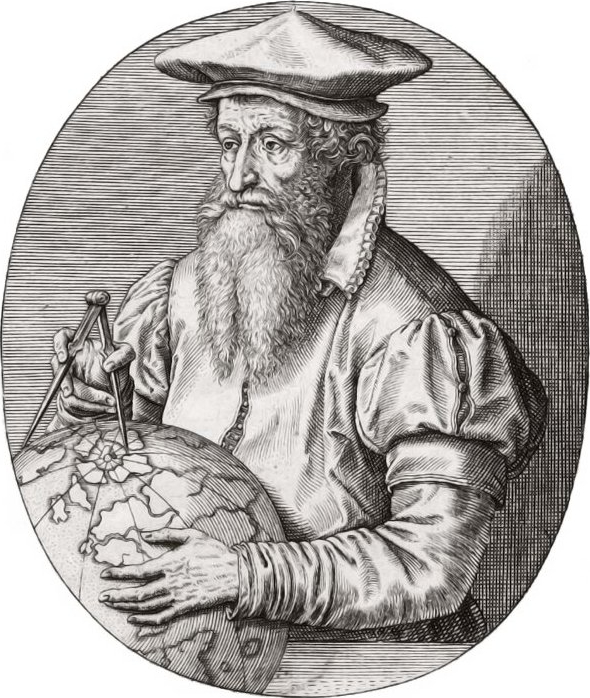
Gerardus Mercator (1512–1594), the celebrated mapmaker, an alumnus of the University of Leuven

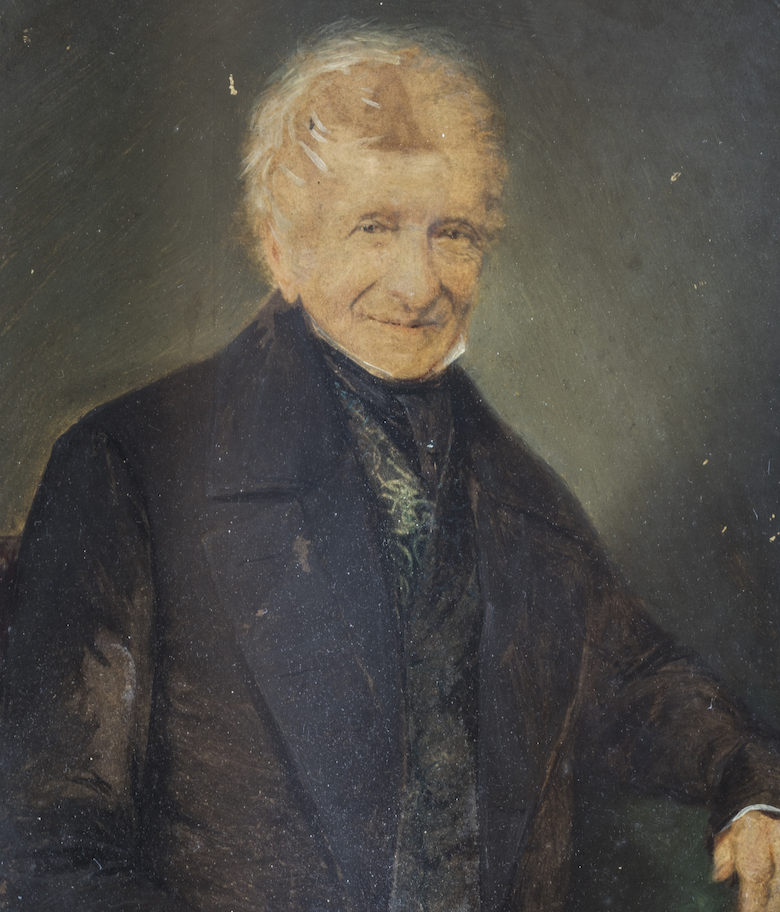
Jean-Baptiste van Dievoet, Licentiatus in both laws (JUL) (1775–1862)

- Desiderius Erasmus Roterodamus (1466–1536), humanist, Catholic theologian, and philologist.
- Michael Baius (1513–1589), theologian, inspirer of the Baianism.
- Petrus Peckius the Younger (1562–1625), diplomat and chancellor of Brabant
- Grégoire de Saint-Vincent (1584–1667), mathematician
- Cornelius Jansen (1585–1638), inspirer of Jansenism.
- Petrus Stockmans (1608–1671), Hellenist and jurisconsult, important member of Jansenism.
- Christian Lupus (1612–1681), jansenist theologian.
- Zeger Bernhard van Espen (1646–1728), canonist, jansenist theologian..
- Martin van Velden (1664–1724), philosopher.
- John Sullivan (1633–1699), rector of the University of Louvain (1690–1691), president of Irish Pastoral College (1672–1697), president of the College de Drieux, Louvain (1692–95). He again became President of the Irish Pastoral College in 1695.
- Josse Le Plat (1732–1810), jurisconsult and professor of canon law, supporter of Josephinism and Enlightenment.
- Martin Fery (1754–1809), professor of philosophy, became representative of the people in the Council of the Five Hundred in 1797. He was a Freemason.
- Jean-Pierre Minckelers (1748–1824), inventor of lighting gas.
- Guillaume van Cutsem (1749–1825) jurisconsult, deputy of the departement of the Deux-Nèthes and adviser to the Imperial Court of Justice in 1811.
- Charles Lambrechts (1753–1825), professor of canon law (1777), rector of the university (1786) and freemason, member of the lodge of the True and Perfect Harmony in Mons, became Minister of Justice of the French Republic from 3 vendémiaire year VI to 2 thermidor year VII.
- Ferdinand Sentelet (1754–1829), graduate in theology, professor of philosophy at the Pedagogy of the Lily and president of the college of Craenendonck, since 1780. Then becomes professor of physics and rural economy at the new State University of Louvain, member of the Netherlands Institute.
- Jean-Baptiste Liebaert, professor of philosophy, after the abolition of the university in 1797 he continued teaching privately and would become a professor at the State University of Louvain.
- Étienne Heuschling (1762–1847), professor of Hebrew at the Collegium Trilingue, orientalist and philologist, then became a professor at the State University of Louvain.
- Jean Philippe Debruyn (1766-), then became a professor at the State University of Louvain.
- Xavier Jacquelart (1767–1856), jurisconsult, professor at the Faculty of Law, he became in 1797 professor at the Law School of the Imperial University in Brussels and then professor at the law faculty of the State University of Louvain

=== Notable alumni ===
- Rudolph of Beringen (active 1420–1459), professor of canon law
- Jan Standonck (1454–1504), Master of the Collège de Montaigu in Paris
- Adriaan Floriszoon Boeyens (1459–1523), Pope Adrian VI
- Desiderius Erasmus (1466–1536), humanist
- Damião de Góis (1502–1574), Portuguese humanist, philosopher
- Johannes Sturm (1507–1589), German educator
- Gerard Mercator (1512–1594), cartographer
- Andreas Vesalius (1514–1564), father of modern anatomy
- Rembert Dodoens (1517–1585), botanist
- Antoine Perrenot de Granvelle (1517–1586), cardinal, statesman
- Wilhelmus Damasi Lindanus (1525–1588), Bishop of Roermond and Gent, author
- John Dee (1527–1608 or 9), mathematician, astronomer, astrologer, occult philosopher, imperialist and adviser to Queen Elizabeth I
- Petrus Peckius the Elder (1529–1589), law professor
- Blessed Diarmaid Ó hUrthuile, or Dermot O'Hurley (c. 1530–1584), Archbishop of Cashel, Roman Catholic martyr
- Willem Hessels van Est (1542–1613), biblical scholar
- Justus Lipsius (1547–1606), philologist
- Leonardus Lessius (1554–1623), Jesuit moral theologian
- Petrus Peckius the Younger (1562–1625), diplomat and chancellor of Brabant
- Aubert Miraeus (1573–1640), ecclesiastical historian
- Jacobus Boonen (1573–1655), Archbishop of Mechelen
- Adriaan van den Spiegel (1578–1625), anatomist and botanist
- Lawrence Beyerlinck (1578–1627), encyclopedist
- Nicolaus Vernulaeus (1583–1649), Latin playwright
- Abbé de Saint-Cyran (1583–1643), French ecclesiastic
- Cornelius Otto Jansen (1585–1638), father of Jansenism
- St Robert Bellarmine (1569–1576), Cardinal, Jesuit theologian.
- John of St. Thomas (1589–1644), theologian and philosopher
- John Sinnich (1603–1666), Irish born, professor of theology
- Marcin Kalinowski (c. 1605–1652), Polish nobleman
- Łukasz Opaliński (1612–1666), political writer
- Franciscus Deurweerders (c. 1616–1666), founder of the Confraternity of the Cord of Saint Thomas
- René-François de Sluse (1622–1685), mathematician
- Cornelis de Bie (1627 – c.1715), Flemish rhetorician
- Joannes Roucourt (1636–1676), parish priest and theologian
- Francis Martin (1652–1722), Irish controversialist
- Edward Ambrose Burgis (c.1673-1747), historian and theologian
- Febronius (1701–1790), historian and theologian
- Henri-Jacques Le Grelle (1753–1826), politician, one of three authors of the 1790 Belgian Constitution.
- Charles Nerinckx (1761–1824), founder of the Sisters of Loretto
- Jean-Baptiste van Dievoet (1775–1862), Licentiatus in both laws

== See also ==
- Academic libraries in Leuven
- Catholic University of Leuven
- Catholic University of Mechelen
- Collegium Trilingue
- Faculty of Theology, Old University of Leuven
- Katholieke Universiteit Leuven
- List of colleges of Leuven University
- List of medieval universities
- State University of Leuven
- Université catholique de Louvain
  - Louvain-la-Neuve
- Universities in Leuven

== Bibliography ==
- 1627: Nicolaus Vernulaeus, Academia Lovaniensis. Ejus origo, incrementum, viri illustres, res gestae, Louvain, 1627.
- 1635: Valerius Andreas, Fasti academici Lovanienses, Louvain, edited by Jean Olivier et Corneille Coenesteyn, 1635.
- 1829: Baron Frédéric de Reiffenberg, Mémoires sur les deux premiers siècles de l'Université de Louvain, Brussels, 1829–35.
- 1838: P. De Ram, Laforêt et Namêche, "Analectes pour servir à l'histoire de l'Université de Louvain", in, Annuaire de l'Université de Louvain, 1838–65.
- 1856: F. Nève. Mémoire historique et littéraire sur le collège des Trois-langues à l'Université de Louvain, Brussels, 1856.
- 1881: Edmond Reusens, Documents relatifs à l'histoire de l'Université de Louvain (1425-1797), in Analectes pour servir à l'histoire ecclésiastique, t. XVII and sequents, 1881–92.
- 1881: P. De Ram, Codex veterum statutorum Academiae Lovaniensis, Brussels, 1881.
- 1884: Arthur Verhaeghen, Les cinquante dernières années de l'ancienne Université de Louvain, Liège, 1884.
- 1945: Léon van der Essen, L'université de Louvain, Brussels, 1945.
- F. Claeys Boúúaert, L'Ancienne Université de Louvain, Études et Documents, Louvain 1956.
- 1959: F. Claeys Boúúaert, Contribution à l'histoire économique de l'Ancienne Université de Louvain,1959.
- 1977: Claude Bruneel, Répertoire des thèses de l'Ancienne Université, Louvain,1977.
- 1990: Emiel Lamberts et Jan Roegiers, Leuven University, 1425–1985, Louvain, University Press, 1990.
- 1990: Jan Roegiers, "Was de oude Universiteit Leuven een Rijksuniversiteit? ", in Archief-en bibliotheekwezen in België, 1990, p. 545.
- 2007: Toon Quaghebeur, "Quelques caractéristiques de la querelle entre l'Université de Louvain et le Saint-Office sur le Jansénisme louvaniste du XVIIe siècle", in: Controverse et polémiques religieuses. Antiquité-Temps Modernes, Paris, l'Harmattan, 2007, p. 87-96.
