= Franz Wilhelm Kampschulte =

German historian

- Born: 12 November 1831; Wickede, Prussia
- Died: 3 December 1872 (aged 41); Bonn, Germany
- Occupations: Historian of the Reformation and Humanism in Germany

Franz Wilhelm Kampschulte (12 November 1831 – 3 December 1872) was a German historian.

== Life ==
Like his elder brother Heinrich, Franz Wilhelm Kampschulte, who was born into a moderately prosperous family, was intended by his parents for a career in the church from an early age. He attended successively three gymnasiums (secondary schools) in Brilon, Paderborn und Münster, acquiring a broad humanistic education, before moving on to study Roman Catholic theology for three years at the academy in Münster. Simultaneously he also studied history and philology. He then studied history for a year at Berlin, principally as a student of Ranke, before going on to prepare for his doctorate under the supervision of Carl Adolph Cornelius: he received his doctorate from Bonn University in March 1856. He was persuaded by friends and his own academic potential to abandon his intention to become a secondary school teacher, instead staying at Bonn and progressing to the further academic qualification of a habilitation in 1857. The next year he was given a professorship in history, becoming a full professor and 1860. Three years later he joined two more senior colleagues to become a joint director of the faculty.

Kampschulte's lectures focused on the late Medieval and early modern periods. His own written work, with minor exceptions, was devoted to the first half of the sixteenth century. His doctoral dissertation, entitled ""De Georgio Wicelio eiusque studiis et scriptis irenicis"", concerned the reformation theologian Georg Witzel. Another important field for him was the History of the University of Erfurt during the age of humanism and the reformation. A two volume work on the topic appeared in 1858 and 1860. It is considered groundbreaking in respect of Konrad Mutian, and on the origins of the Epistolæ Obscurorum Virorum, and therefore important for students and scholars of German humanism.

During the 1860s he turned his attentions to Calvin. The first volume of what was intended as a three volume work, entitled "John Calvin: his church and his state in Geneva" was printed in 1869. In it he described the political and religious conflicts in Geneva. The volume then addressed Calvin's development as a reformer, his first Geneva period, his banishment from the city and his return in 1541. The themes for the second volume included Calvin's further struggles and eventual triumph in Geneva. Kampschulte died on 3 December 1872, apparently from the lung disease by which he had been troubled ever since his childhood, still working on the second volume, reportedly with his quill pen in his hand. This second volume was in the end completed by Walter Goetz and published in 1899. The third volume never appeared.

== Reflections ==
Kampschulte was a conscientious, cautious and persistent researcher. Just a few weeks before his death he was still working away in the archives at Bern on research for his second volume on the career of John Calvin.

He was a friend of Franz Heinrich Reusch and Theodor Stumpf, whose theological conclusions he broadly shared. He rejected the concept of Papal infallibility, powerfully re-asserted in 1869 at the First Vatican Council by Pope Pius IX.
