= Alardus of Amsterdam =

Engraving by Theodor de Bry, 1598

Alardus or Alaard of Amsterdam (Latin: Alardus Amstelredamus) (1491–1544) was a Dutch humanist scholar, known as an editor of Rodolphus Agricola and Erasmus.

== Life ==
Alardus was born in Amsterdam, a relation of Meynard Man. His teachers may have included Willem Hermans and Alexander Hegius. By 1511 he was teaching in Alkmaar, where he was a student of Murmellius who became the headmaster.

Alardus then led an itinerant life, tracking down Agricola's works left in manuscript. He was at one point on good terms with Erasmus, but they later fell out.

== Works ==
Alardus took part in the publication of Agricola's De inventione dialectica in 1515, and was editor of a revised edition in Cologne in 1538. His major work was the two-volume collected edition of Agricola of 1539.
