= Cornelis de Schepper =

Flemish mathematician, counselor and ambassador

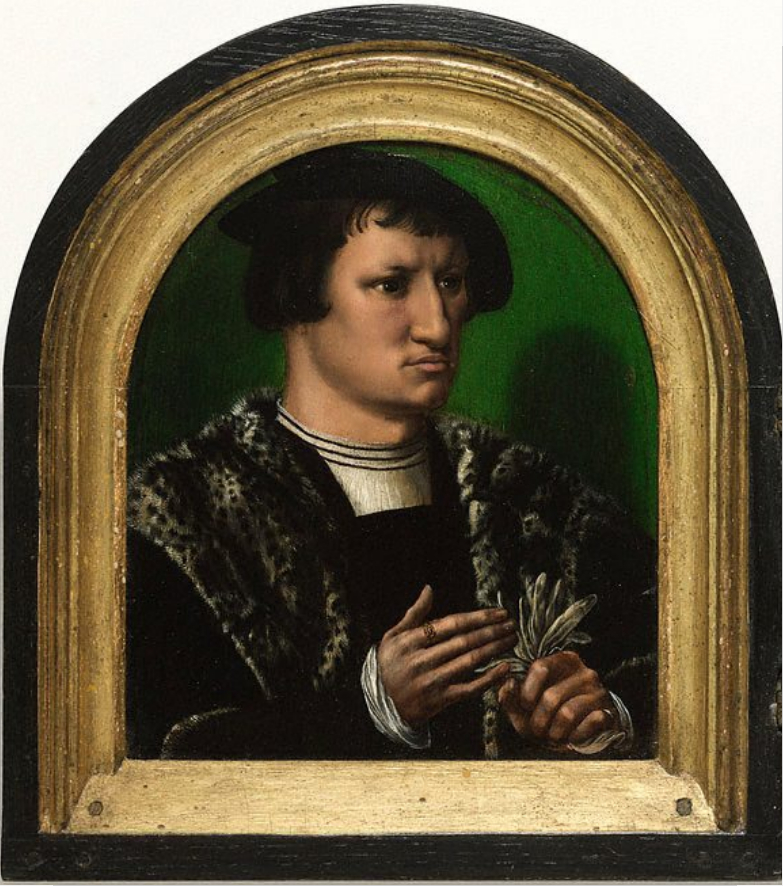
- Cornelis de Schepper by Ambrosius Benson
- Born: c.1503 Nieuwpoort
- Died: 28.03.1555; Antwerp
- Other names: Cornelius Duplicius Scepperus
- Occupations: Diplomat, state councillor

Cornelis de Schepper, Cornelis Duplicius de Schepper or Cornelius de Schepper (1503?-1555) was a Flemish mathematician, counselor and ambassador for the Holy Roman Emperor Charles V, Ferdinand I of Austria and Mary of Hungary, governor of the Netherlands. He is also known by his Latin name Scepperus.

== Early life ==
He was born in Nieuwpoort, Flanders probably in 1503. His father was Jan or Jacob de Schepper, the mayor of Dunquerke, and his mother Gislaine de Severin. His grandfather Jan was vice-admiral of Flanders and had an active military career fighting the English and the French. While the family name was originally the Flemish 'de Dobbele' or, in Latin: 'Duplicius' (meaning 'Double'), the honorific 'de Schepper' (the Captain) was later added because of the naval exploits of the grandfather.

Cornelis received his initial schooling from his uncle L. de Schepper, pastor of Ekelsbeke, near Cassel. He attended lectures at the Paris University where he studied under Gérard Roussel, a member of the circle of Jacques Lefèvre d'Étaples. In December 1522 Schepper matriculated at the Collegium Trilingue of Louvain where he likely started his friendship with Goclenius, Viglius, Juan Luis Vives and other humanists from Bruges. He also studied philosophy, jurisprudence and mathematics. He published in 1523 in Antwerp a mathematical treatise entitle Assertionis fidei adversus astrologos sive de significationibus coniunctionum superiorum planetarum anni 1524, which established his reputation in this field.

It was possibly through an introduction from Fevyn and Cranevelt, that in 1523 he entered the service of Christian II of Denmark, the exiled brother-in-law of Emperor Charles V.

== In the service of Christian II of Denmark ==
Initially de Schepper worked as secretary to Godschalk Ericksen, Christian's chancellor, and a few months later he became Christian's vice-chancellor. As part of the Danish royal retinue he travelled to England during the summer of 1523 and at the end of that year to Wittenberg where they met Martin Luther and Philip Melanchthon. While staying at Wittenberg, de Schepper published a couple of pamphlets to defend Christian's claims against Fredrick of Holstein and the City of Lubeck who had joined the king's opponents to remove him from the throne.

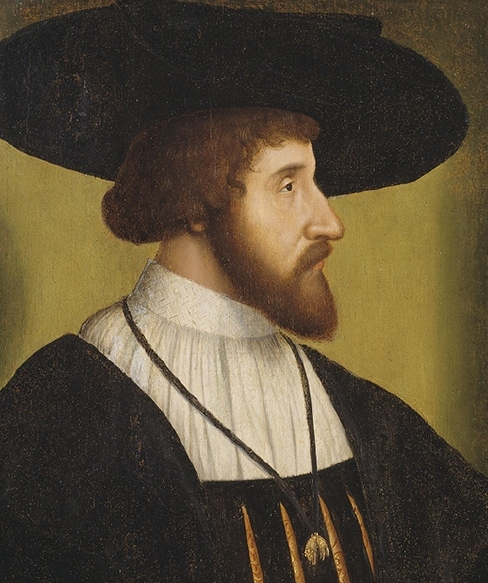
Christian II of Denmark

In December 1524 the Danish King sent de Schepper to Spain to request Emperor Charles support in his attempt to recover the throne of Denmark. On his way to Spain de Schepper stopped in England to continue to advance the royal Danish cause with Henry VIII and Wolsey. It was probably during his stay in Spain that he first encountered his lifelong friends Johannes Dantiscus, the Polish ambassador at the imperial court, and Alfonso de Valdés, the Latin secretary at the imperial chancellery.

== In the service of Emperor Charles V ==
He returned to the Low Countries in time to comfort Isabella of Austria, the wife of Christian II and sister of Charles V, on her deathbed on 19 January 1526 at Zwijnarden, near Ghent. He wrote an epitaph for her tomb and an elegy which well expresses his deep sense of affection for the royal couple. Following Isabella's death, he felt that as a Flemish he should rather try to enter the Emperor's service so during the spring of 1526 he probably travelled back to Spain and became close to the Imperial Chancellor Mercurino di Gattinara.

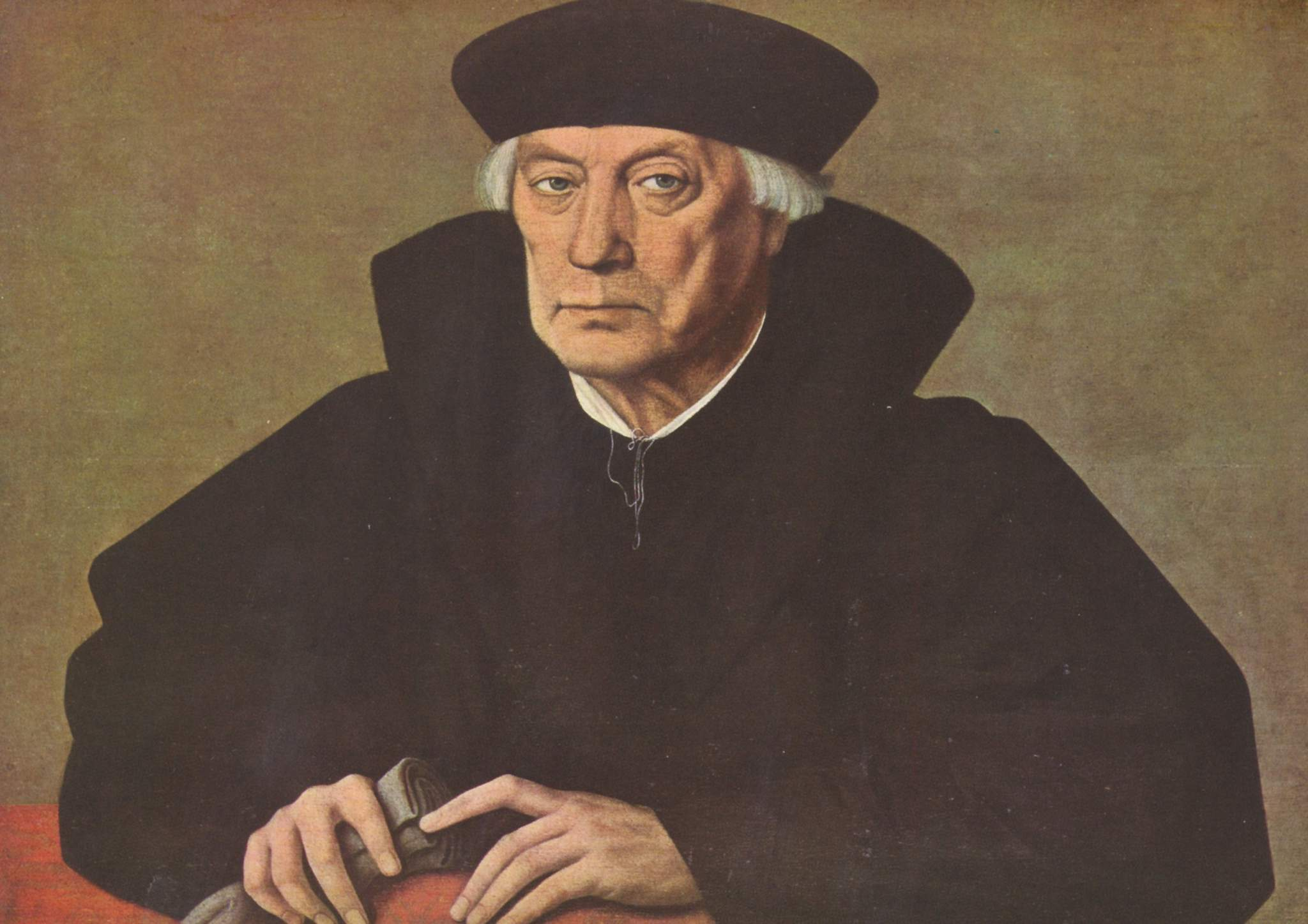
Mercurino di Gattinara, Imperial Chancellor

In 1527 he accompanied Gattinara during his trip to Italy and in 1528 undertook his first embassy to the Polish King. As part of Gattinara's entourage, he attended the Emperor's coronation in Bologna in February 1530. In April Emperor Charles V appointed de Schepper as general inquisitor of the Low Countries. De Schepper, in turn, employed Jean Vuystinck as inquisitor for Flanders. Vuystinck started to systematically arrest Jews of Portuguese origin and the whole episode damaged de Schepper's relationship with the Emperor.

After Gattinara's death, Valdés and de Schepper attended the Diet of Augsburg where they participated in some conciliatory negotiations with Lutheran representatives such as Philip Melanchthon and Justus Jonas, although they failed to produce any agreement.

In 1531 and 1532 de Schepper contributed to the Lutheran reformation debate as to the Emperor's envoy during several missions to Switzerland, Germany, Bohemia and Poland.

In 1533 he joined Ferdinand's ambassador Jeronimo de Zara in a peace mission to Constantinople where they met Suleiman the Magnificent and his Grand Vizier Ibrahim Pascha, as well as the Venetian Alvise Gritti who was held in high esteem by the Turkish emperor at that time. Zara and de Schepper managed to successfully conclude a peace treaty with the Turks on behalf of King Ferdinand. The Flemish artist Pieter Coecke van Aelst also joined de Schepper's party to Constantinople in the hope of convincing the Turkish sultan to give him commissions for tapestries. After his return from Constantinople, he travelled via Old Serbia (where he visited Mileševa Monastery on 11 August 1533) to Spain to report on his mission to the Emperor. Charles asked him to return to Turkey this time as an Imperial envoy but his second mission in 1534 did not achieve much. The mood at the Ottoman court had shifted following pressures on the Persian border, and both the Grand Vizier Ibrahim Pascha and his protégé Alvise Gritti were starting to lose their influence with Suleiman. Nevertheless, the Emperor rewarded de Schepper's efforts with an appointment as Maître des Requêtes of the Privy Council of the Habsburg Netherlands.

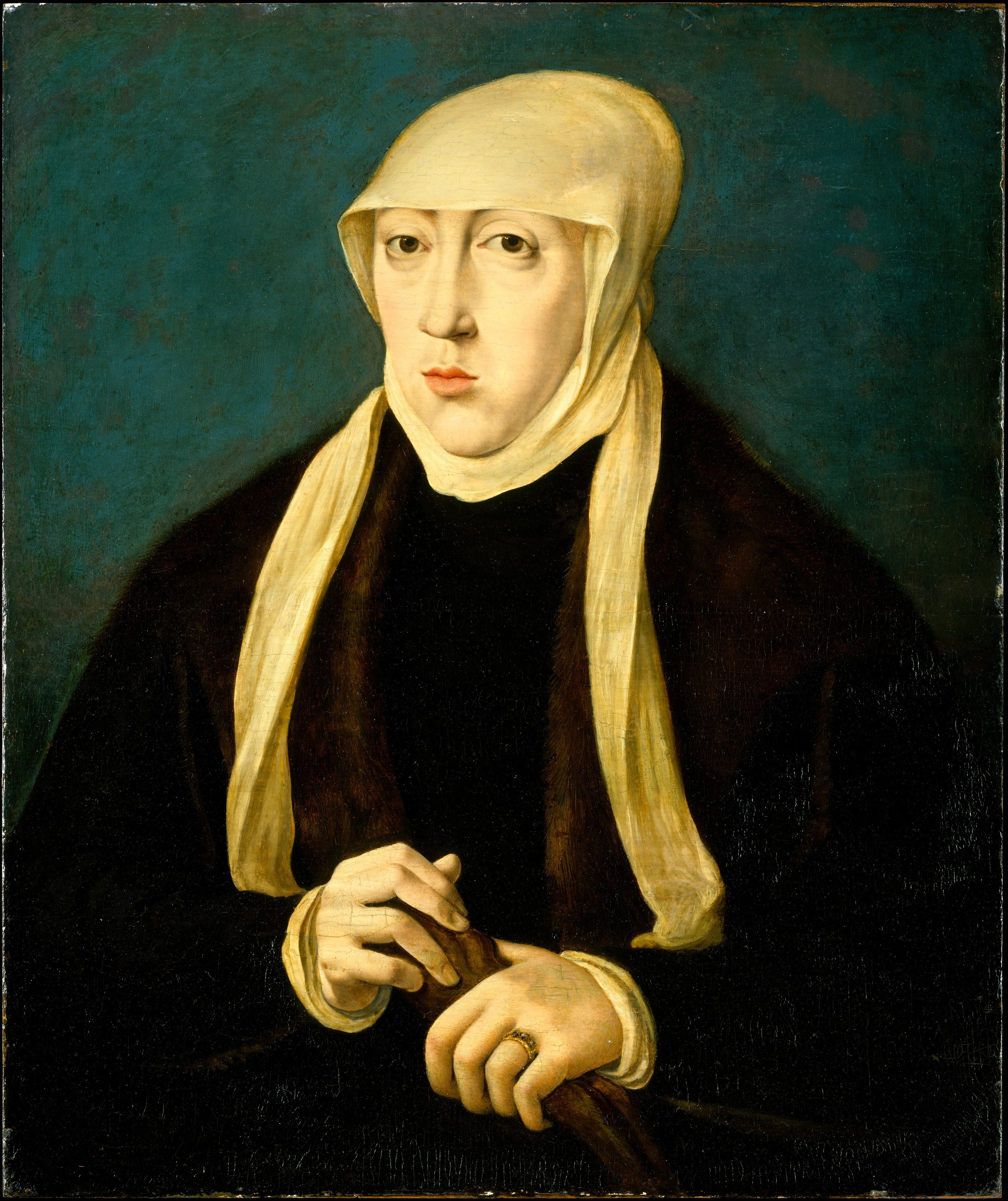
Mary, Queen of Hungary

In 1536 a new war broke between Francis I of France and Emperor Charles V. De Schepper participated in several missions to achieve a peace agreement and was part of the team that under Nicolas de Perrenot's leadership prepared the peace summit between Francis and Charles in Nice. He attended the summit in June 1538 and in 1539 negotiated with the French King permission for the Emperor's journey from Spain to the Low Countries through France.

== In the service of Mary of Hungary ==
In 1541, the governess of the Low Countries Mary of Hungary appointed de Schepper as her ambassador to the French court. By 1542 he was back in the Low Countries and conducted numerous missions for Mary of Hungary to support her policies towards the German princes as well as her efforts to build war defences. In 1545 he travelled several times to England to help conclude a peace treaty between Henry VIII of England and Francis I of France. In 1550 he participated in an attempt to smuggle Mary Tudor out of England to the safety of the Habsburg dominions but the whole operation failed when she refused to leave.

Between 1550 and 1555 de Schepper acted as commissioner of the Netherlands fleet beside the Admiral Maximilian of Burgundy. He became the most important maritime expert of the central government of the Netherlands in Brussels and can be regarded as the first naval policymaker of the Habsburg government in the Netherlands. The admiral and the state councillor worked closely together and, under the leadership of the regent, they were responsible for the implementation of the maritime policy of the Habsburg Netherlands for several years. Maximilian of Burgundy and de Schepper corresponded with Mary of Hungary during periods of war on an almost daily basis to keep her informed about the activities at sea and to issue recommendations.

Late 1550 or early 1551, de Schepper fell from his horse and was badly injured. The accident left him lame and scarcely able to move on two crutches. He died on 28 March 1555 in Antwerp, aged 52 years.

== Personal life ==
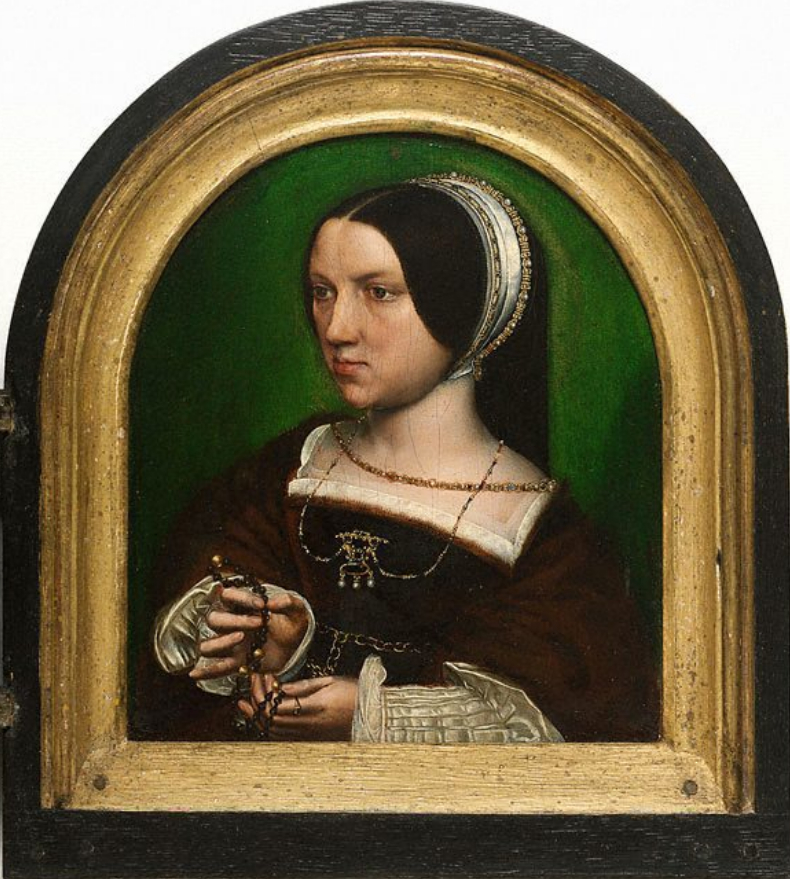
Portrait of Elizabeth Donche by Ambrosius Benson, c.1540

De Schepper married twice. His first wife was Elisabeth Donche who died on 20 August 1549 at the age of 51. They had together a daughter called Anne. De Schepper's second wife was Marguerite Loonis with whom he had no children.

De Schepper spoke many languages and was highly appreciated in humanist circles. Erasmus wrote in the Ciceronian that “Not only is de Schepper knowledgeable in all kinds of branches of science, but he also has literary talents in prose and poetry”.

Alfonso de Valdés, Johannes Dantiscus and Viglius, the Flemish statesman and jurist, were some of his closest friends. De Schepper had an extensive network of correspondents that included Erasmus, Goclenius, Olahus, Melanchthon and Bovelles.

Like many of his contemporaries de Schepper had a keen interest in astrology. In 1524 he published “Assertionis fidei adversus astrologos sive de significationibus coniunctionum superiorum planetarum anni 1524”, an extensive contribution to the widespread debate that was instigated by predictions of catastrophic floods following the Great Conjunction of 1524.

== Works ==
De Schepper is the author of works of poetry, astronomy and history. His most notable works are:

- Assertionis fidei adversus astrologos sive de significationibus coniunctionum superiorum planetarum anni 1524, Antwerp, Franciscus Byrckmann,
- Epitaphium Isabellae illustrissimae Danorum reginae, Antwerp, Gregorius de Bonte
- Rerum a Carolo V Caesare Augusto in Africa bello gestarum commentarii, Antwerp, Johannes Bellerius

== Bibliography ==
- Altmeyer, J.J. (1840). Histoire des Relations Commerciales et Diplomatiques des Pays-Bas avec le Nord de L'Europe. Bruxelles: Librairie Encyclopedique de Perichon
- Garcia Hernan, E. (2016). Vives y Moro, la amistad en tiempos dificiles. Madrid: Catedra.
- Peter G. Bietenholz, Thomas Brian Deutscher Eds. (1987). Contemporaries of Erasmus: A Biographical Register of the Renaissance and Reformation, Volumes 1–3. University of Toronto Press.
- Saint Genois, L. B. (1856). Missions Diplomatiques De Corneille Duplicius De Schepper. L'Académie Royale de Belgique.
- Saint Genois, L. B. (1856). Recherches sur le véritable nom, le lieu de naissance, la famille et les armoires, la sépulture et les écrits de Cornille de Schepper. In Messager des sciences historiques, des arts et de la bibliographie de Belgique. Gand.
- Sicking, Louis (2004). Neptune and the Netherlands. Brill
- Vocht, H. (1953). History of the Foundation and the Rise of the Collegium Trilingue Lovaniense 1517-1550 - Part 2 The development. Humanistica Lovaniense - vol.11, pp. 95–224.
- Vocht, H. (1961). Humanistica Lovaniensia - vol. 16, John Dantiscus and his Netherlandish friends: as revealed by their correspondence 1522–1546. Leuven University Press.
