= Johannes Veghe =

German preacher and religious writer

Johannes Veghe (c.1435 – 21 September 1504) was a German preacher and religious writer.

== Life ==
Veghe was born in Münster in Westphalia. His father seems to have been a physician. In 1450 he matriculated at the University of Cologne; in the register of students he is called Johannes ten Loc alias Veghe clericus Monasteriensis. In 1451 he entered the house of the Brethren of the Common Life of Münster, in 1469 became first rector of the house of the Brethren at Rostock, returned to Münster in 1471, and was made rector there in 1475. On account of ill health he resigned in 1481 and became confessor to the Sisters of Niesink in Münster; this position which he retained until his death, gave him time to gratify his literary tastes.

He lived to see the victory of humanism in Münster and Westphalia; the humanists Johannes Murmellius and Hermann von dem Busche in their poems praise his pious life and his study of religious books.

== Works ==
His earliest work is his Geistliche Jagd, dedicated to Magnus II, Duke of Mecklenburg-Schwerin and Güstrow. This is a description of a spiritual chase, whose object is God; all the details of an actual hunt are applied to the sphere of spiritual things. This work was followed by the: Marientrost, in which Veghe wishes to show how and why one should appeal to the Virgin Mary; Geistliches Blumenbett (Lectulus Floridus), dedicated to the Sisters of Niesink; and Weingarten der Seele (Vineyard of the Soul), which treats in three books of the progress of man from the beginning of Christian life to perfection.

Veghe's main work consists of sermons delivered in Low German before the Sisters of Niesink 1492. They are notable for the keen observation of nature and knowledge of the human heart. His sermons were edited by Professor Franz Jostes in 1883. In dogma Veghe held rigidly to the teachings of the Church, but he would not accept the gaining of indulgences for the dead, who he believed were entirely under the hand and judgment of God.
