= Hermann von dem Busche =

German humanist writer

Hermann von dem Busche (also Hermannus Buschius or Pasiphilus; 1468–1534) was a German humanist writer, known for his Vallum humanitatis (1518). He was a pupil of Rudolph von Langen. Vallum humanitatis, sive Humaniorum litterarum contra obrectatores vindiciae (1518) was in effect a manifesto for the humanist movement of the time.

== Life ==
He was born at Sassenberg. He studied at Heidelberg, at Tübingen, and in Italy, where he became versed in Latin. Among his teachers were Alexander Hegius, Rodolphus Agricola, Pomponius Laetus, and Filippo Beroaldo. He moved back to Munster and the prince-bishop Heinrich von Schwarzburg, but decided to become a jurist and went to study in Cologne. He was dismissed from teaching posts, in Leipzig (1505) and Erfurt (1507).

He became involved in controversy in 1509 around Ortwin, a conservative figure of the older generation, with whom he had clashed over textbooks, wanting to use Aelius Donatus. He has been thought to be one of the authors of the Epistolae Obscurorum Virorum, an anonymous work that includes satirical attacks on Ortwin; but this is not now generally agreed.

He joined the leaders of the Reformation, was a friend of Ulrich von Hutten, and in 1527 was appointed first professor of classical literature at the University of Marburg, founded in that year by Landgrave Philip the Magnanimous.

In addition to Vallum Humanitatis, a defense of humanistic studies, he wrote three books of epigrams, and other works.
