= Synod of Mainz =

In the history of the Catholic Church in Germany, there have been many synods (church councils) held in Mainz. Traditionally, the archbishops of Mainz held the title of Primate of Germany.

Synod of Mainz (or Council of Mainz, Latin: Concilium Moguntinum) may refer to:

- Council of Mainz (813), convoked by Charlemagne and presided over by Archbishop Hildebold of Cologne
- Council of Mainz (829), convoked by Louis the Pious
- Council of Mainz (847), convoked by Louis the German, the first of three council held under Archbishop Hrabanus Maurus
- Council of Mainz (848), which condemned Gottschalk of Orbais
- Council of Mainz (852), a combined church council and royal assembly
- Council of Mainz (888), held in the aftermath of the deposition of Charles the Fat and the dissolution of the Carolingian Empire
- Council of Mainz (1028), actually held just outside Mainz in a place called Geizlete
- Council of Mainz (1049), attended by the Emperor Henry III
- Council of Mainz (1071), held to resolve a disputed succession in the diocese of Constance
- Council of Mainz (1075), attempted to implement the Gregorian Reform in Germany
- Council of Mainz (1225), held under the presidency of Cardinal Conrad of Urach
- Councils of Mainz (1233), two councils which dealt with the heretical Stedingers
- Councils of Mainz (1261), held because of the Mongol invasions of Europe
- Councils of Mainz (1310), discussed the accusations against the Knights Templar
- Councils of Mainz (1451), published eighteen canons
- Councils of Mainz (1549), council concerning faith and discipline in response to the Reformation
