= Johann Crotus =

Johann Crotus, or in his native German Johannes Jäger, hence often called Venator, "hunter", but more commonly, in grecized form, crotus, "archer", was a German Humanist. From the name of his birthplace he also received the Latinized appellation Rubianus and is generally known as Crotus Rubianus.

== Biography ==
Johann was born at Dornheim, in Thuringia, c. 1480. At the age of eighteen he went to the University of Erfurt, then the chief centre of German Humanism, where he obtained his baccalaureate degree in 1500. Friendship with Conrad Mutianus and Ulrich von Hutten led him from being an upholder of Scholasticism to become an enthusiastic partisan of Humanism and a violent opponent of the older learning. In 1505 he induced Ulrich von Hutten to leave the monastery of Fulda, but in 1506 came back with the latter from Cologne to Erfurt, where in 1508 Crotus obtained a degree of Master of Arts. After this he was absent from Erfurt for a short time as tutor to Count von Henneberg, but by 1509 he had again returned to his studies and in 1510 was the head of the abbey school at Fulda. He now formed close relations with Reuchlin and his supporters in Cologne; about 1514 he was for a short time in Cologne, but soon returned to Fulda where he was ordained priest and obtained a small benefice.

About 1515, he wrote the larger part of the Epistolæ Obscurorum Virorum; the 'letters of obscure men' composed by him are the most violent in character, full of venom and stinging scorn against Scholasticism and monasticism. In 1517 he settled in Bologna as tutor of the Fuchs brothers, and during his stay at this city, up to 1519, he studied successively jurisprudence and theology. Before leaving Italy he went in company with Eoban Hesse to Rome (1519) in order to observe for himself the "see of corruption". While in Bologna he had become acquainted with Martin Luther's writings and actions, learned of the violent stand he had taken and approved it as the beginning of a greatly needed reform of the Church; apparently also he had a share in the anonymous broadsides which appeared in Germany.

From 1520, he was again in Erfurt where he was made rector of the university, and here in 1521 he gave Luther a warm greeting when the latter passed through Erfurt on his way to Worms. Soon after this Crotus returned to Fulda, where Philip Melanchthon visited him in 1524. In the same year Crotus entered the service of Albert, Duke of Prussia, at Königsberg and endeavoured to justify the duke's withdrawal from the Catholic Faith in a pamphlet directed against the new master of the Teutonic Order entitled "Christliche Vermahnung" 'Chriastian warning' (1526). Weary of his position at Königsberg as early as 1529, he went first, in 1530, to Leipzig, and soon afterwards to Halle; here Crotus accepted service under Cardinal Albrecht of Brandenburg as councillor and received a canonry.

While living in Halle, Crotus began to express dissatisfaction with the Lutheran movement. In his 1531 Apologia, qua respondetur temeritati calumniatorum non verentium confictis criminibus in populare odium protrahere reverendissimum in Christo patrem et dominum Albertum, Crotus defended Albert of Brandenburg against criticism from Luther and Alexander Crosner, accusing the Reformation of sanctioning immorality and blasphemy. The Apologia drew criticism from Justus Jonas, as well as various anonymous writers; some critics questioned Crotus' motives for aligning himself with the Catholic Church, suggesting that he hoped to profit from the connection. In a letter dated 1532 to Albert, Duke of Prussia, Crotus made his adherence to Catholicism clear, writing that "with the help of God he intends to remain in communion with the Church and allow all innovations to pass over like a disagreeable smoke".

Crotus appears to have spent the last years of his life entirely at Halle, but nothing positive is known on the subject. Most probably Georg Witzel urged him at different times to write again in defence of the Catholic Church, and he seems, indeed, to have made an effort to do this. But afterwards it is mentioned that the position, "unworthy of a man", in which he was placed, did not permit him to take up his pen on behalf of religion. It is not entirely certain whether his canonry or his character of official in the service of Cardinal Albrecht laid these limitations on him. Yet he apparently had an important influence on the writings of others as, e.g. on those of Witzel. He died probably at Halle, c. 1539.
