= Rudolph von Langen =

German Catholic divine

Rudolph von Langen (1438 or 1439 – December 1519) was a German Catholic divine, who helped introduce Humanistic ideas to the town of Munster, Westphalia. He was born in the village of Everswinkel, near Munster, to an aristocratic family.

There is dispute as to his education. According to Hermann Hamelmann, he received his schooling at Deventer, in the school of Thomas a Kempis, together with Rodolphus Agricola, Alexander Hegius, Anton Liber of Soest, Count Maurice von Spielenberg, and Ludwig Dringenberg. However, the Catholic Encyclopedia disputes this. In 1456 he entered the University of Erfurt, and received the degree of B.A. in 1459, and M.A. in 1460. But before this he was made Canon of the cathedral of Munster, and provost of the old cathedral in 1462. He went to Rome in 1466 in connection with the election of a bishop. At Munster he was the centre of literary life, as well as of humanistic efforts. He was surrounded by a group of men of similar tastes. He possessed a good classical library, which he placed at the disposal of others. Hermann von dem Busche, later to become a prominent humanist, was one of his pupils, to whom he imparted a love of classical literature. In 1500, he reformed the cathedral school of Munster into a humanistic institution, patterned after the one at Deventer. The course of instruction was changed, and other masters were called. The school was also indebted to the subrector, Johannes Murmellius, a leading Dutch humanist, and its flourishing condition and widespread influence, which reached to Schleswig and Pomerania, drew numerous scholars. He died in Munster. The inscription on Langen's tomb there lauds him as the patron of scholars and the friend of the poor.

== Published works ==
Langen wrote a poem about the destruction of Jerusalem, which has not been preserved; also a prose work, which was published in Deventer about 1485. In 1486 the first printing office at Munster, belonging to Johann Limberg, printed his poems. In 1493 he published the Rosarium beatissimae virginis gloriosissimaeque dei matris Mariae; about 1494 an epitaph on Albertus Magnus; and the Horae de sancta cruce in 1496. His poetry was not particularly successful.

== Sources ==
- cites:
  - Hermann Hamelmann, Oratio de Rudolf Langio von 1580 in Geschichtliche Werke, I, pt. II, 1-34: I, pt. III, 15-371 (Munster, 1905–1908)
