= Heinrich Kampschulte =

German Roman Catholic priest, politician and historian

Heinrich Johann Kampschulte
- Born: 28 March 1823; Wickede, North Rhine-Westphalia Germany
- Died: 30 April 1878 (aged 55)
- Occupations: German Roman Catholic priest, Catholic Centre Party politician and an historian

Heinrich Johann Kampschulte (28 March 1823 – 30 April 1878) was a German Roman Catholic priest, Catholic Centre Party politician and an historian.

== Life ==
Kampschulte was born into a prosperous family in Wickede, a small town on the banks of the Ruhr. He attended secondary school in Paderborn, and went on to study Theology at Münster. In 1846 he was ordained into the priesthood at Paderborn. As a priest his first job was as a chaplain with the Fürstenberg family at Castle Körtlinghausen near Warstein. He then got a position as a chaplain at Brilon, where he also taught in the local secondary school. Some time later he became a Vicar at Geseke, before returning to Brilon as a priest in the town's Alme district. In 1860 he moved to Höxter, taking a post as a Dean.

Even before the Church-state power struggle ("Kulturkampf") became a defining feature of German politics in the 1870s, Heinrich Kampschulte was one of those advocating a more visibly defined presence for The Church in the country's political structure. In 1871 his was one of the first signatures on the founding declaration for the Catholic Centre Party. He sat as a member the Prussian House of Representatives, representing the new party, between 1870 and 1873.

Heinrich Kampschulte's most lasting importance comes from his work as a church historian, notably of the important Westphalian region. He also published theological works on his own account, and translated "Pensées" [Thoughts on Religion] (1861) by Blaise Pascal into German.

== Family ==
The historian Franz Wilhelm Kampschulte was Heinrich Kampschulte's younger brother.

== Publications (not a complete list) ==
- Geschichte der Einführung des Protestantismus im Bereiche der jetzigen Provinz Westfalen. Pragmatisch dargestellt. Schöningh, Paderborn 1866.
- Der Almegau. Münster 1865.
- Die westfälischen Kirchenpatrocinien, besonders auch in ihrer Beziehung zur Geschichte der Einführung und Befestigung des Christentums in Westfalen. Schöningh, Paderborn 1867.
- Beiträge zur Geschichte der Stadt Geseke. Stein, Werl 1868 (online).
- Der Dukat des Erzbischofs von Köln in Westfalen und Engern. Regensberg, Münster 1868 (Separatdr. aus: Zeitschr. für vaterländ. Gesch und Altertumskunde 28; 1869).
- Kirchlich-politische Statistik des vormals zur Erzdiöcese Köln gehörigen Westfalens. Ein Beitrag zur älteren vaterländischen Geschichte und Geographie. Rempel, Lippstadt 1869 (online).
- Chronik der Stadt Höxter. Nach gedruckten und ungedruckten Quellen. Buchholtz, Höxter 1872 (online).
