= Ortwin =

German theologian

Hardwin von Grätz (Note: Also written Hardwin von Graetz and Hardwin von Gratz.) (French: Hardouin de Graes), (Note: Also written Hardouin de Graetz.) better known in English as Ortwin (Latin: Ortuinus Gratius; (Note: Also written Ortuin, Orthvinus, and Orthuinus Gratius.) 1475 – 22 May 1542), was a German humanist scholar and theologian.

== Life ==
Ortwin was born in Holtwick (now in the District of Coesfeld, Westphalia) and died in Cologne, Germany. He was raised by his uncle, Johannes von Grätz, in Deventer. In 1501 he left to pursue philosophical studies at the University of Cologne. After joining Kyuk Burse, Ortwin became licensed in 1505, attained Masters level in 1506, and became an Art Professor in 1507. He supplemented his salary by proofing documents for the Quentell printing house and wrote introductions and poetic dedications in the volumes of classical authors of the Middle Ages.

Ortwin was a follower of Hegius and Peter of Ravenna, a Humanist, and boasted many prominent intellectual friends. Because Ortwin sided with the Cologne University theologians and the Dominicans during the Reuchlin controversy, he found himself the subject of aggressive attacks from Hermann von dem Busche and the younger generation who were not pleased with his translations of the Jewish convert, Johannes Pfefferkorn.

Ortwin had at that time just finished a literary tournament with Hermann von dem Busche and had been made the laughing-stock of the literary world by the venomous Epistolae obscurorum virorum, letters that were addressed to him. His adversaries succeeded in vilifying him on both moral and scientific grounds, denouncing his Latin and Greek scholarship and portraying him as a drunkard and worse. Ortwin made no response until Pope Leo X excommunicated the author, readers, and distributors of the Epistolary (1517). After his weak and ineffective defense, entitled Lamentationes obscurorum virorum, his damaged reputation remained distorted for centuries. In 1520 he was ordained to the priesthood and thereafter focused entirely on literary work.

== Works ==
His magnum opus was the Little Collection of Things to Be Sought & Things to Be Avoided (Latin: Fasciculus Rerum Expetendarum & Fugiendarum), a collection of 66 more or less weighty letters and treatises by various authors on ecclesiastical and secular history, dogma and canon law, compiled to expose the noxious elements in the Church's organism and to prepare a way for a future council to remedy them. It has been wrongly claimed that this work, put on the Index on account of its anticlerical tendency, was not from the pen of Gratius.
