= Epistolæ Obscurorum Virorum =

Satirical Humanist text (1515-1519)

The Epistolæ Obscurorum Virorum (English: Letters of Obscure Men) was a celebrated collection of satirical Latin letters which appeared 1515–1519 in Hagenau, Germany. They support the German Humanist scholar Johann Reuchlin and mock the doctrines and modes of living of the scholastics and monks, mainly by pretending to be letters from fanatic Christian theologians discussing various topics. They tell each other stories about their lovers, give senseless recommendations, boast about their successes, meanwhile covering other topics such as whether all Jewish books should be burned as un-Christian or not. They are prone to quote the Bible along with Latin poetry, often mistakenly or in ill-suited context.

== Background ==
The work was based upon the real-life public dispute between German humanist Johann Reuchlin and certain Dominican friars, especially the formerly Jewish convert Johannes Pfefferkorn who had obtained Imperial authority from Holy Roman Emperor Maximilian I to burn all known copies of the Talmud in 1509. The title is a reference to Reuchlin's 1514 book Epistolae clarorum virorum (English: Letters of famous/bright men) which provided a collection of letters to Reuchlin on scholarly and intellectual matters from eminent German humanists such as Ulrich von Hutten, Johann Crotus, Konrad Mutian, Helius Eobanus Hessus, and others, to show that his position in the controversy with the monks was approved by the learned. The Latin adjective obscurus ("dark, hidden, obscure") is the opposite of clarus ("bright, famous, obvious") used in the title of Reuchlin's book.

== Structure and presumptive authors ==
Most of the letters found in Epistolæ Obscurorum Virorum are addressed to Hardwin von Grätz in Deventer and contain mock accusations against him, such as allegation that he had been intimate with Johannes Pfefferkorn's wife (Letter XII) and that Grätz had defecated his pants in public (letter XL). The letters profess to be written by certain ecclesiastics and professors in Cologne and other towns of Germany. Grätz had made himself odious to the liberal minds of the time by what they saw as his arrogant pretension, his determined hostility to the spirit of the age, and his lax morality.

The first issue of the work contained 41 letters, but more were added later. The collection was published anonymously, and the authorship has been a fertile subject of controversy, but the main portion of the letters are attributed to the humanists Crotus Rubeanus a.k.a. Johannes Jäger, who is said to have originated the idea and the title; Ulrich von Hutten, who contributed mainly to the second volume; Erasmus; and Reuchlin. The work is credited with hastening the Protestant Reformation.

== Bans and papal excommunication ==
The book was banned in many places, and with regard to the rise of Martin Luther's Protestant Reformation, Pope Leo X excommunicated the authors, readers, and disseminators of the Epistolæ Obscurorum Virorum in 1517, citing the fact that the discussed matter of burning all Jewish books, especially the Talmud, was not held as a majority view among Christian scholars.

== Legacy ==
The modern term obscurantism derives from the title of this work. As the theologians in the book intended to burn "un-Christian" works, Enlightenment philosophers used the term for conservative, especially religious enemies of progressive Enlightenment and its concept of the liberal spread of knowledge.
