= Filippo Beroaldo =

Italian philosopher (1453-1505)

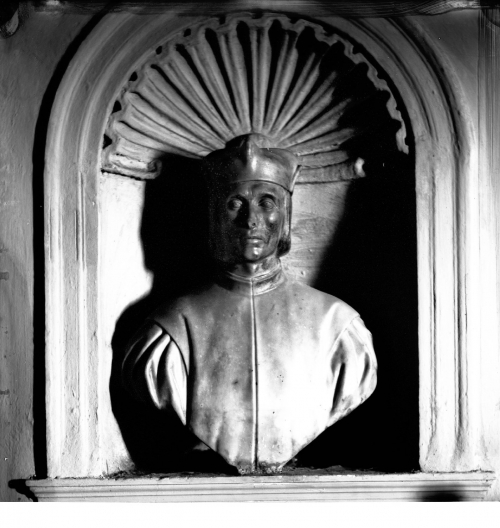
Onofri-busto de filippo beroaldi

Filippo Beroaldo, sometimes called "the Elder" to distinguish him from his cousin Filippo Beroaldo the Younger, and also known as Philip or Philippus Beroaldus (7 November 1453 – 17 July 1505) was an Italian humanist active as a professor at the University of Bologna.

== Life ==
Born in Bologna in a local noble family, Filippo Beroaldo studied with Francesco Puteolano, who worked at the University of Bologna as a professor of rhetoric and poetry, and was active as editor of early printed editions of Ovid, Catullus and Tacitus. On the return of Puteolano to Milan, Berolado was made the new professor of rhetoric and poetry in 1472, despite being only 19 years old.

In 1475, he left Bologna and travelled to Parma and Paris, where he befriended Robert Gaguin, but by 1479 he was back in Bologna, where he would remain as professor until he died in 1505.

Beroaldo was a very popular teacher. It was said that up to 300 students followed his lectures, and that 200 students left the university after his death. His students included some of the children of Giovanni II Bentivoglio, Filippo Beroaldo the Younger (1472–1518, cousin of Beroaldo), Hermann von dem Busche, Polydore Vergil, Andrzej Krzycki, Jodocus Badius, and Giovanni Battista Pio, who both later became professors at Bologna. Berolado also sometimes worked as a diplomat for Bentivoglio. He is considered to be the leading Italian humanist from 1494 on, after the death of Poliziano.

== Work ==
- Annotationes centum, taking 104 philological problems from ancient texts and providing resolutions for them
- Opusculum de terraemotu et pestilentia (Bologna, 1505)

Beroaldo, like many humanists, edited texts by Roman writers with added annotations. These include texts by

- Apuleius: The Golden Ass
- Aulus Gellius: Attic Nights
- Cicero: the Philippicae and Tusculanae Disputationes
- Frontinus
- Juvenal
- Lucan: Pharsalia
- Pliny the Elder: Natural History
- Propertius
- Suetonius
- Florus
