= Godschalk Ericksen =

Godschalk Ericksen (d. 1544), was Christian II of Denmark's chancellor and later a diplomat at the service of Emperor Charles V.

== Life ==
Ericksen was born in Schleswig. He was Christian II of Denmark's chancellor by 1517 and when Christian went into exile in 1523, he remained by his side despite many others abandoning the Danish king.

Ericksen became a tutor of Christian's children a few months before Christian's son, Prince John, died. When Christian II became a lifelong prisoner in July 1532, Ericksen entered the Emperor Charles V's service, following him to Spain in 1533. He was subsequently sent on missions to Bavaria, 1533, to Cologne, Trier and Münster in 1535, and to the Hansa Towns in 1535. In the following years he is recorded amongst the administrators of the army, and was sent to levy a corps of landsknechts in Germany, at the head of whom he preceded the Emperor into Ghent in February 1540.

Having fallen from his horse at Valenciennes, he became ill and died on September 28, 1544..

== Bibliography ==
- Peter G. Bietenholz, Thomas Brian Deutscher Eds. Contemporaries of Erasmus: A Biographical Register of the Renaissance and Reformation, Volumes 1-3. University of Toronto Press (1987).
- Vocht, H. Humanistica Lovaniensia - vol. 16, John Dantiscus and his Netherlandish friends: as revealed by their correspondence 1522-1546. Leuven University Press (1961).
