= Frans van Cranevelt =

Flemish humanist and lawyer

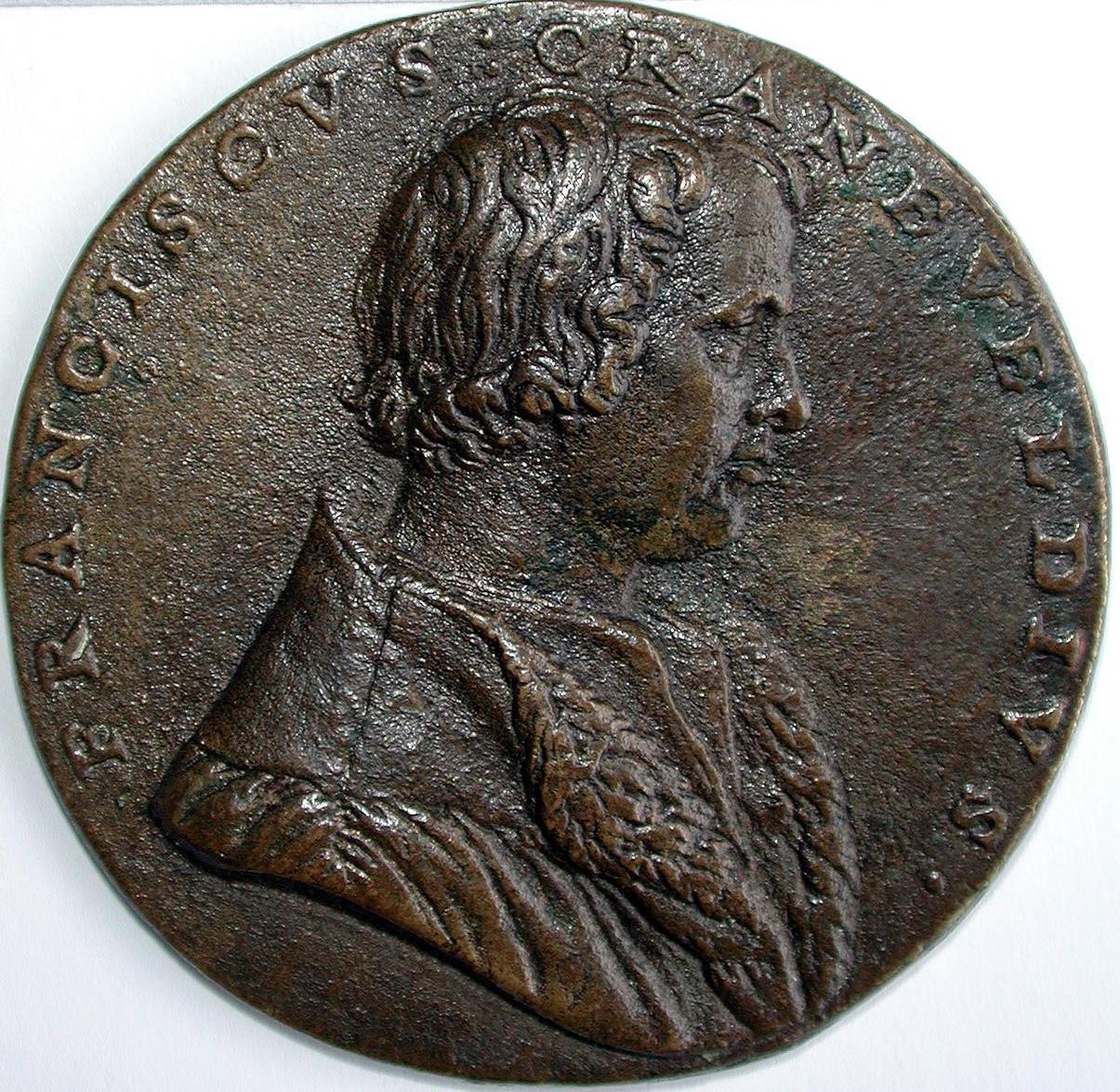

Frans van Cranevelt (Nijmegen, 3 February 1485 – Mechelen, 8 September 1564), also known as Franciscus Craneveldius, was a Flemish humanist and lawyer.

== Life ==
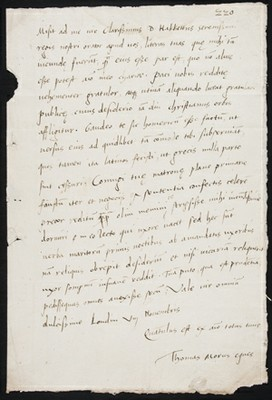
Letter from Thomas More to Frans Cranevelt - 8 November 1528. KU Leuven Libraries Special Collections, LCB, Ep. 41

Cranevelt was the son of Herman van Cranevelt (1442–1518), secretary of three successive dukes of Guelders, and Irma van Heusden-Helshout (died 1528). In 1509 he married Elisabeth van Baussele (d.1545) from Leuven, who bore him at least eleven children, and in 1560 he married the widow Catherine de Plaine.

After having received home education, together with Gerard Geldenhouwer, and having studied at the Latin school in Deventer, in 1497 he went to Cologne for his university studies. At that time he was barely thirteen and when he completed his studies in 1500 he was not awarded a degree because he was too young. He then went to Leuven University, where he studied under Johannes Despauterius and Adriaan Floriszoon, the future Pope Adrian VI. In 1505 he graduated licentiate of philosophy as the top of his year (primus). In 1506 he became a licentiate in civil and canon law and in 1510 doctor of laws. From 1507 he taught law.

In 1515 he took up the position of city pensioner of Bruges and in this capacity he pronounced speeches to welcome important guests to the city, including King Christian II of Denmark, Emperor Charles V, and Cardinal Thomas Wolsey. On 27 September 1522, Emperor Charles V appointed him a councillor in the Great Council of Mechelen. He continued to exercise this office until his death. On the Council and at the Court in Mechelen he became a man of considerable influence.

Despite his political responsibilities Cranevelt maintained a lively correspondence with many of the most important humanists of his time, such as Erasmus, Thomas More, Adrianus Barlandus, and his close friend Juan Luis Vives. He enjoyed the esteem of all not only because of his erudition, but also for his sound judgment, his pleasant character and the good mood he kept in all circumstances.

== Bibliography ==
- Peter G. Bietenholz, Thomas Brian Deutscher Eds. (1987). Contemporaries of Erasmus: A Biographical Register of the Renaissance and Reformation, Volumes 1-3. University of Toronto Press.
- Vocht, H. (1953). History of the Foundation and the Rise of the Collegium Trilingue Lovaniense 1517-1550 - Part 2 The development. Humanistica Lovaniense - vol.11, pp. pp. 95–224.
- Vocht, H. (1928) Litterae ad Craneveldium
