= History of the Catholic Church in Germany =

The history of the Catholic Church in Germany should be read in parallel with the history of Germany as the Church was progressively confused, in competition with, oppressed by and distinguished from, the state. The long history of Roman Catholicism in Germany can also explain much of the history of the Roman Catholic Church, especially in the period of the Middle Ages, under the Holy Roman Empire.

== Christianization of the Germans ==
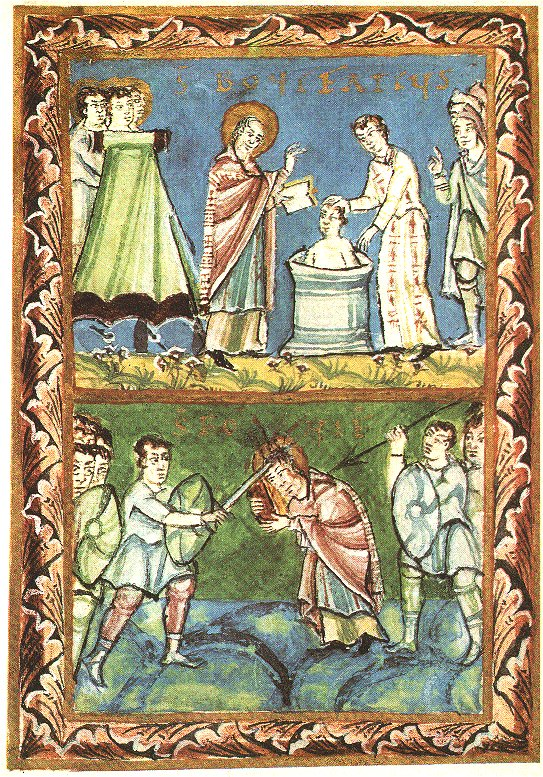
Saint Boniface, Baptising and Martyrdom, from the Sacramentary of Fulda

The earliest stage of Christianization of the various Celtic people and Germanic people occurred only in the western part of Germany, the part controlled by the Roman Empire. Christianization was facilitated by the prestige of the Christian Roman Empire amongst its pagan subjects and was achieved gradually by various means. The rise of Germanic Christianity was at first voluntary, particularly among groups associated with the Roman Empire. After Christianity became a largely unified and dominant force in Germania, remaining pockets of the indigenous Germanic paganism were converted by force. But aspects of the primeval pagan religion have persisted to this day, including the names of the days of the week.

As Roman rule crumbled in Germany in the 5th century, this phase of Catholicism in Germany came to an end with it. At first, the Gallo-Roman or Germano-Roman populations were able to retain control over big cities such as Cologne and Trier, but in 459 these too were overwhelmed by the attacks of Frankish tribes. Most of the Gallo-Romans or Germano-Romans were killed or exiled. The newcomers to the towns reestablished the observance of the pagan rites. The small remaining Catholic population was powerless to protect its faith against the new, ruling, Frankish lords.

But as soon as 496, Frankish King Clovis I was anointed together with many members of his household. In contrast to the eastern German tribes, who became Arian Christians, he became a Catholic. Following the example of their king, many Franks were baptized, but their Catholicism was mixed with pagan rites.

Over the next eight centuries, Irish, Scottish, and English missionaries reintroduced Christianity into the German territories. During the period of the Frankish Empire, the two most important of these missionaries were Columbanus, who was active in the Frankish Empire from 590, and St Boniface, who was active from 716. The missionaries, particularly the Scottish Benedictines, founded monasteries (Schottenklöster, Scottish monasteries) in Germany, which were later combined into a single congregation governed by the Abbot of the Scots monastery at Regensburg. The conversion of the Germanic peoples began with the conversion of the Germanic nobility, who were expected to impose their new faith on the general population. This expectation was consistent with the sacral position of the king in Germanic paganism: the king is charged with interacting with the divine on behalf of his people. Hence the general population saw nothing wrong with their kings choosing their preferred mode of worship. The favoured method of showing the supremacy of the Christian belief was the destruction of the holy trees of the Germans. These were trees, usually old oaks or elm trees, dedicated to the gods. Because the missionary was able to fell the tree without being slain by the god, his Christian god had to be stronger. The pagan sacrifices, known as blót, were seasonal celebrations where gifts were offered to appropriate gods and attempts were made to forecast what the coming season would be like. Similar events were sometimes convened in times of crisis, for much the same reasons. The sacrifices, consisting of gold, weapons, animals, and even human beings, were hung on the branches of a holy tree. The Hiberno-Scottish mission ended in the 13th century. Supported by native Christians, they succeeded in Christianizing all of Germany.

== The foundation of Christendom under Charlemagne ==
The real History of Roman Catholicism in Germany begins on Christmas Day, 800, on the day where Charlemagne is crowned emperor by the Pope. "On this day the Germanic idea of the Kingdom of God, of which Charlemagne was the representative, bowed to the Roman idea, which regards Rome as its centre – Rome the seat of the old empire and the most sacred place of the Christian world. Charlemagne when emperor still regarded himself as the real leader of the Church. Although in 774 he confirmed the gift of his father to the Roman res publica, nevertheless he saw to it that Rome remained connected with the Frankish State; in return it had a claim to Frankish protection. He also interfered in dogmatic questions.

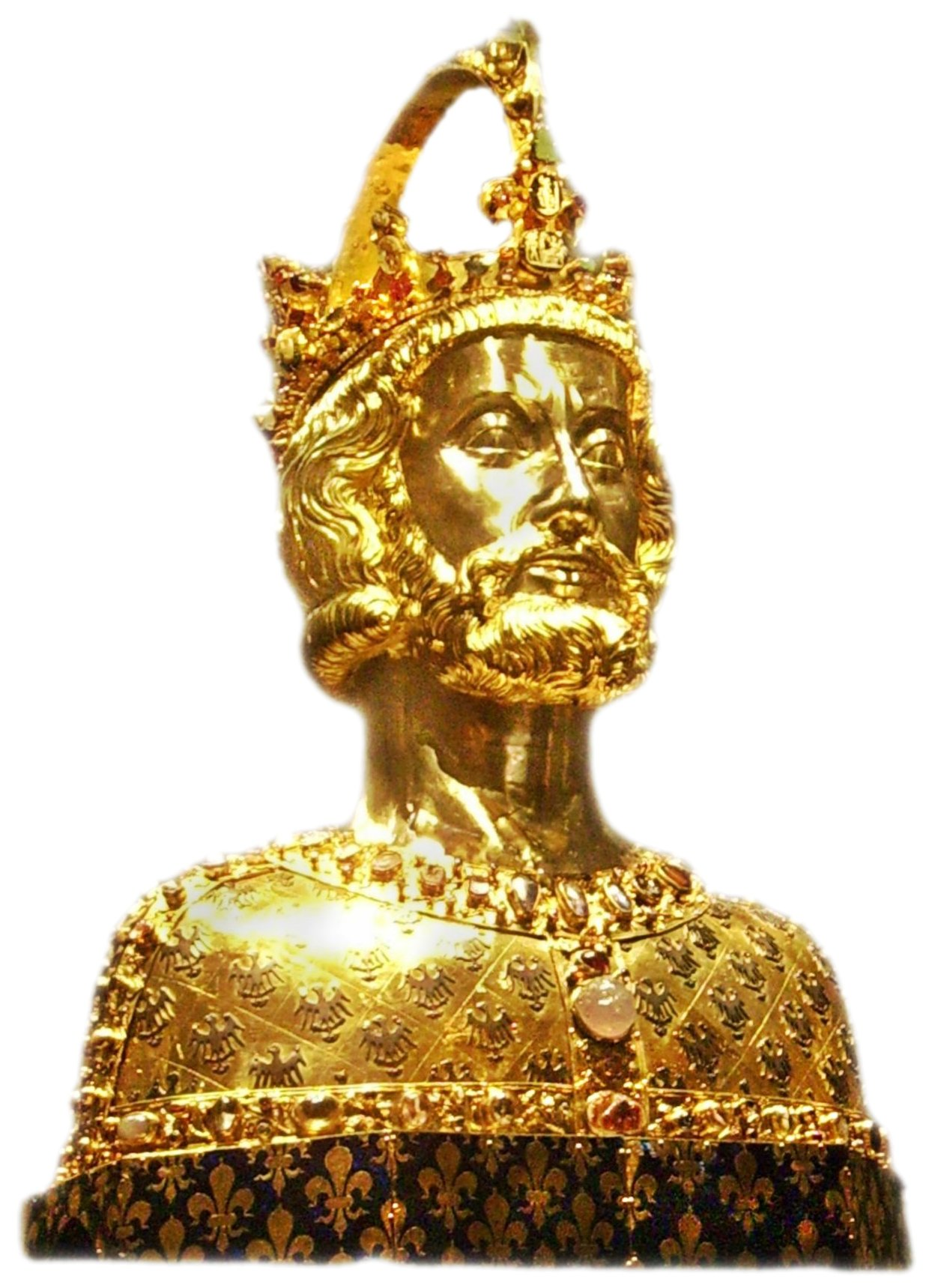
A bust of Charlemagne, key figure in the attempt of a united Christendom. Part of the treasury in the Aachen Cathedral.

Charlemagne looked upon the revived Roman Empire from the ancient point of view inasmuch as he greatly desired recognition by the Eastern Empire. He regarded his possession of the empire as resulting solely from his own power, consequently he himself crowned his son Louis. Yet on the other hand he looked upon his empire only as a Christian one, whose most noble calling it was to train up the various races within its borders to the service of God and thus to unify them.

The empire rapidly declined under his weak and nerveless son, Louis the Pious (814-40). The decay was hastened by the prevailing idea that this State was the personal property of the sovereign, a view that contained the germ of constant quarrels and necessitated the division of the empire when there were several sons. Louis sought to prevent the dangers of such division by law of hereditary succession published in 817, by which the sovereign power and the imperial crown were to be passed to the oldest son. This law was probably enacted through the influence of the Church, which approved of this unity of the supreme power and the Crown, as being in harmony with the idea of the Kingdom of God and also as required by the hierarchical economy of the church organization. When Louis had a fourth son, by his second wife, Judith, he immediately set aside the law of partition of 817 for the benefit of the new heir. An odious struggle broke out between father and sons, and among the sons themselves. In 833 the emperor was captured by his sons at the battle of Luegenfeld (field of lies) near Colmar. Pope Gregory IV was at the time in the camp of the sons. The demeanour of the pope and the humiliating ecclesiastical penance that Louis was compelled to undergo at Soissons made apparent the change that had come about since Charlemagne in the theory of the relations of Church and State. Gregory's view that the Church was under the rule of the representative of Christ, and that it was a higher authority, not only spiritually but also substantially, and therefore politically, had before this found learned defenders in France. In opposition to the oldest son Lothair, Louis and Pepin, sons of Louis the Pious, restored the father to his throne (834), but new rebellions followed when the sons once more grew dissatisfied.

In 840, the emperor died near Ingelheim. The quarrels of the sons went on after the death of the father, and in 841 Lothair was completely defeated near Fontenay (Fontanetum) by Louis the German and Charles the Bald. The empire now fell apart, not from the force of national hatreds but in consequence of the partition now made and known as the Treaty of Verdun (August, 843), which divided the territory between the sons of Louis the Pious: Lothair, Louis the German (843-76), and Charles the Bald, and which finally resulted in the complete overthrow of the Carolingian monarchy."

"As the idea of political unity declined, that of the unity of the Church increased in power. The Kingdom of God, which the royal priest, Charlemagne, by his overshadowing personality had, in his own opinion, made a fact, proved to be an impossibility. Church and State, which for a short time were united in Charlemagne, had, as early as the reign of Louis the Pious, become separated. The Kingdom of God was now identified with the Church. Pope Nicholas I asserted that the head of the one and indivisible Church could not be subordinate to any secular power, that only the pope could rule the Church, that it was obligatory on princes to obey the pope in spiritual things, and finally that the Carolingians had received their right to rule from the pope. This grand idea of unity, this all-controlling sentiment of a common bond, could not be annihilated even in these troubled times when the papacy was humiliated by petty Italian rulers. The idea of her unity gave the Church the strength to raise herself rapidly to a position higher than that of the State. From the age of St. Boniface the Church in the East Frankish Kingdom had direct relations with Rome, while numerous new churches and monasteries gave her a firm hold in this region. At an early date the Church here controlled the entire religious life and, as the depositary of all culture, the entire intellectual life. She had also gained frequently decisive influence over German economic life, for she disseminated much of the skill and many of the crafts of antiquity. Moreover the Church itself had grown into an economic power in the East Frankish Kingdom. Piety led many to place themselves and their lands under the control of the Church."

== Catholicism as the official religion of the Holy Roman Empire ==
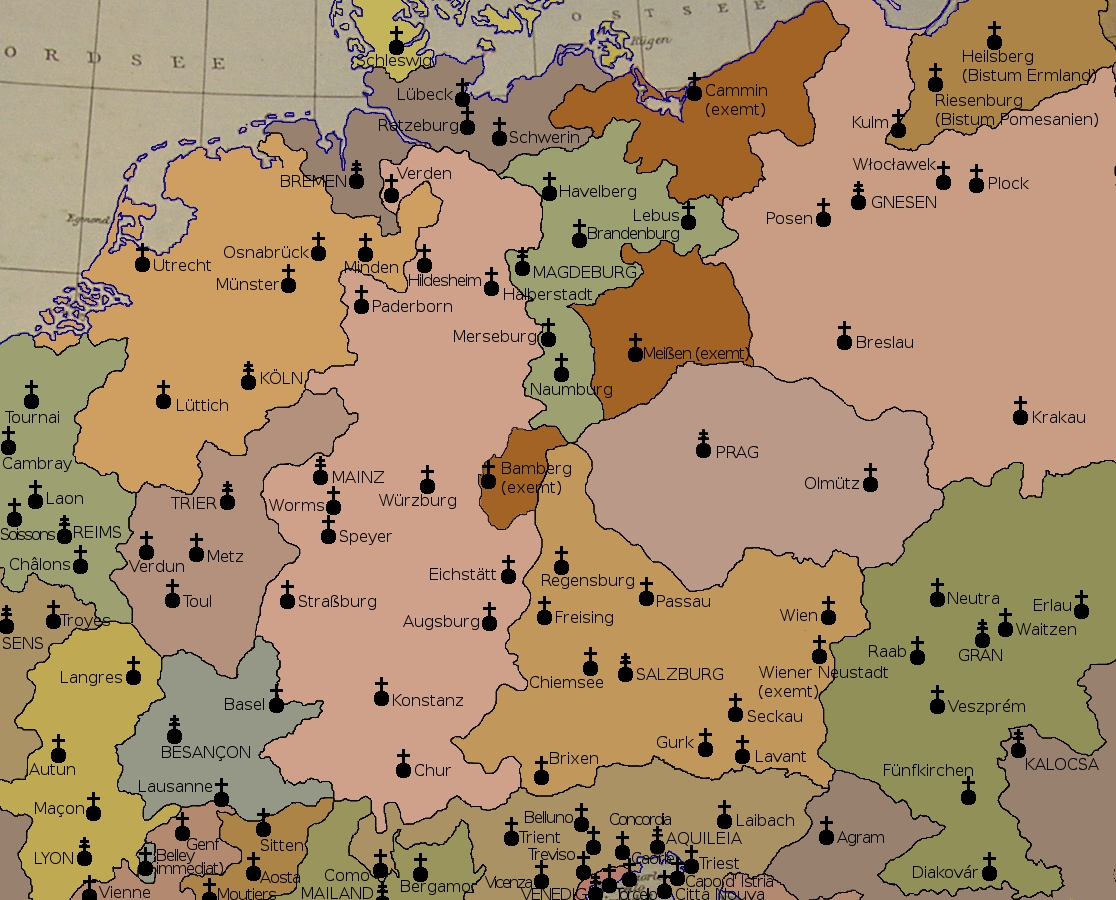
Ecclesiastical provinces and episcopal sees in Central Europe, A.D. 1500

In medieval times, Catholicism was the only official religion within the Holy Roman Empire. (There were resident Jews, but they were not considered citizens of the empire.) Within the empire, the Catholic Church was a major power. Large parts of the territory were ruled by ecclesiastical lords. Three of the seven seats in the council of electors of the Holy Roman Empires were occupied by Catholic archbishops: the Arch-chancellor of Burgundy (archbishop of Trier), the Arch-chancellor of Italy (archbishop of Cologne), and the Arch-chancellor of Germany (archbishop of Mainz).

Charlemagne, crowned Roman Emperor in 800 AD, is sometimes considered as a forerunner of the Holy Roman Empire. Most historians today reject this view, arguing that the Holy Roman Empire had different antecedents and a different constitution, and the Holy Roman Emperor had a different status and role than Charlemagne and his successors. After the collapse of Charlemagne's empire, the Imperial crown was initially disputed among the Carolingian rulers of Western Francia (France) and Eastern Francia (Germany), with first the western king (Charles the Bald) and then the eastern (Charles the Fat) attaining the prize. However, after the death of Charles the Fat in 888, the empire broke asunder, never to be restored. According to Regino of Prüm, each part of the realm elected a "kinglet" from its own "bowels". After the death of Charles the Fat, those who were crowned Emperors by the Pope controlled only territories in Italy. The last of such Emperors was Berengar I of Italy, who died in 924.

Henry (Heinrich) I the Fowler (r. 919–936), a Saxon elected at the Reichstag of Fritzlar in 919, designated his son Otto, who was elected King in Aachen in 936, to be his successor. A marriage alliance with the widowed queen of Italy gave Otto control over that nation as well. His later crowning as Emperor Otto I (later called "the Great") in 962 would mark an important step, since from then on the Eastern-Frankish realm – and not the West-Frankish kingdom that was the other remainder of the Frankish kingdoms – would have the blessing of the Pope. Otto had gained much of his power earlier, when, in 955, the Magyars were defeated in the Battle of Lechfeld.

In contemporary and later writings, this crowning would also be referred to as translatio imperii, the transfer of the Empire from the Romans to a new Empire. The German Emperors thus thought of themselves as being in direct succession to those of the Roman Empire; this is why they initially called themselves Augustus. Still, they did not call themselves "Roman" Emperors at first, probably in order not to provoke conflict with the Roman Emperor who still existed in Constantinople. The term imperator Romanorum only became common under Conrad II (later than his crowning in 1027, thus in the early-middle 11th century) after the Great Schism.

The glory of the Empire almost collapsed in the Investiture Controversy, in which Pope Gregory VII declared a ban on King Henry IV (king 1056, Emperor 1084–1106). Although this was taken back after the 1077 Walk to Canossa, the ban had wide-reaching consequences. Meanwhile, the German dukes had elected a second king, Rudolf of Swabia, whom Henry IV could only defeat after a three-year war in 1080. The mythical roots of the Empire were permanently damaged; the German king was humiliated. Though, most importantly, the Church was clearly an independent player in the political system of the Empire, not subject to imperial authority.

"Under the last of the Hohenstaufens, the beginnings of a national culture began to appear. Latin had fallen into disuse, and German became the prevailing written language. For the first time, Germany felt that she was a nation. This soon brought many Germans into opposition with the Church. In the conflict between the papacy and the empire, the former often seemed the opponent of nationalism, and bitterness was felt, not against the idea of the Church, but against its representative. The Germans still remained deeply religious, as was made evident by the German mystics."

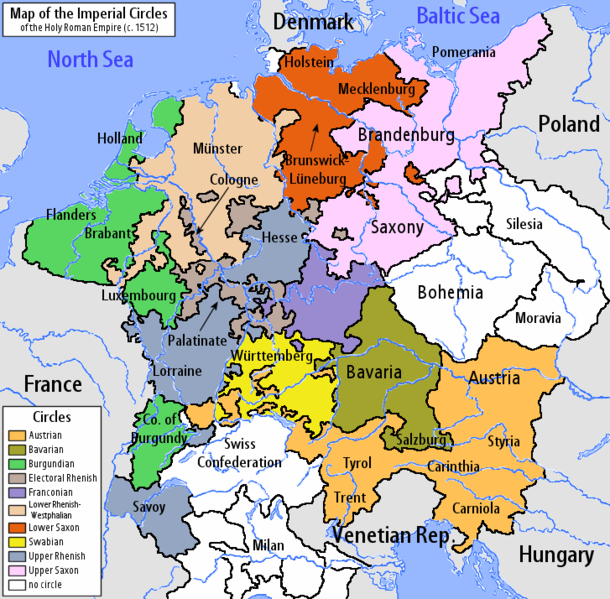
Map of the Imperial Circles of the Holy Roman Empire (c. 1512)

The "constitution" of the Empire was still largely unsettled at the beginning of the 15th century. Although some procedures and institutions had been fixed, for example, by the Golden Bull of 1356, the rules of how the king, the electors, and the other dukes should cooperate in the Empire much depended on the personality of the respective king. At the same time, the church was in crisis too. The conflict between several competing popes was only resolved at the Council of Constance (1414–1418); after 1419, much energy was spent on fighting the heresy of the Hussites. The medieval idea of a unified corpus Christianum, of which the papacy and the Empire were the leading institutions, began to decline.

== The Protestant Reformation ==
Around the beginning of the 16th century, there was much discontent in the Holy Roman Empire, caused by abuses such as indulgences in the Catholic Church and a general desire for reform.

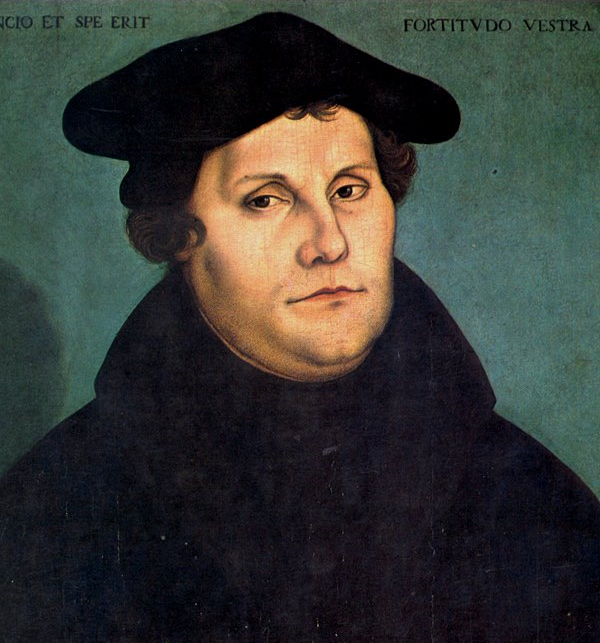
Martin Luther, 1529

In 1517, the Reformation began with the publication of Martin Luther's 95 theses; he had posted them innocuously in the town square, and copies of them to German nobles, but never nailed them to the church door in Wittenberg as is commonly said. Rather, an unknown person decided to take the 95 theses from their obscure posting and nail them to the Church's door. The list detailed 95 assertions Luther believed to show corruption and misguidance within the Catholic Church. One often cited example, and perhaps Luther's chief concern, was a condemnation of the selling of indulgences; another prominent point within the 95 theses is Luther's disagreement both with the way in which the higher clergy, especially the pope, used and abused power, and with the very idea of the pope.

In 1521, Luther was outlawed at the Diet of Worms. But the Reformation spread rapidly, helped by the Emperor Charles V's wars with France and the Turks. Hiding in the Wartburg Castle, Luther translated the Bible from Latin to German, establishing the basis of the German language.

In 1524, the German Peasants' War broke out in Swabia, Franconia and Thuringia against ruling princes and lords, following the preachings of Reformist priests. But the revolts, which were assisted by war-experienced and politically motivated noblemen like Götz von Berlichingen and Florian Geyer (in Franconia), and by the theologian Thomas Münzer (in Thuringia), were soon repressed by the territorial princes. It is estimated that as many as 100,000 German peasants were massacred during the revolt, usually after the battles had ended. Burghers and monarchs were united in their frustration at the Catholic Church not paying any taxes to secular states while itself collecting taxes from subjects and sending the revenues disproportionately to Italy. Martin Luther denounced the Pope for involvement in politics. Luther's doctrine of the two kingdoms justified the confiscation of church property and the crushing of the Great Peasant Revolt of 1525 by the German nobles. This explains the attraction of some territorial princes to Lutheranism.

From 1545, the Counter-Reformation began in Germany. The main force was provided by the Jesuit order, founded by the Spaniard Ignatius of Loyola. Central and northeastern Germany were by this time almost wholly Protestant, whereas western and southern Germany remained predominantly Catholic. In 1547, Holy Roman Emperor Charles V defeated the Schmalkaldic League, an alliance of Protestant rulers.

On September 25, 1555, Charles V, Holy Roman Emperor, and the forces of the Schmalkaldic League signed the Peace of Augsburg to officially end the religious wars between the Catholics and the Protestants. This treaty legalized the partitioning of the Holy Roman Empire into Catholic and Protestant territories. Under the treaty, the religion of the ruler (either Lutheranism or Catholicism) determined the religion of his subjects. This policy is widely referred to by the Latin phrase, cuius regio, eius religio ("whose reign, his religion", or "in the prince's land, the prince's religion"). Families were given a period in which they were free to emigrate to regions where their desired religion prevailed. In 1608/1609 the Protestant Union and the Catholic League were formed.

From 1618 to 1648, the Thirty Years' War ravaged in the Holy Roman Empire. The causes were the conflicts between Catholics and Protestants, the efforts by the various states within the Empire to increase their power and the Emperor's attempt to achieve the religious and political unity of the Empire. The immediate occasion for the war was the uprising of the Protestant nobility of Bohemia against the emperor (Defenestration of Prague), but the conflict was widened into a European War by the intervention of King Christian IV of Denmark (1625–29), Gustavus Adolphus of Sweden (1630–48), and France under Cardinal Richelieu, the regent of the young Louis XIV (1635–48). Germany became the main theatre of war and the scene of the final conflict between France and the Habsburgs for predominance in Europe. The war resulted in large areas of Germany being laid waste, a loss of approximately a third of its population, and in a general impoverishment.

The war ended in 1648 with the Peace of Westphalia, signed in Münster and Osnabrück: Imperial territory was lost to France and Sweden and the Netherlands left the Holy Roman Empire after having de facto seceded 80 years earlier. The imperial power declined further as the states' rights were increased.

"Aided by the personal charm of its young king Louis XIV, who had assumed the government in 1661, France appeared to have obtained a dominant influence in Germany. France interfered in every quarrel among the states of the empire, defending its own interest and the interests of Roman Catholicism. Catholicism lost its preponderance once more owing both to the renewed decay of political and national life in Germany and to the decline of France," with the later whittling down of the French monarchy under Louis XV and ultimately under Louis XVI.

== Secularization of church states in the aftermath of the French Revolution ==
In the war of the First Coalition, revolutionary France defeated the coalition of Prussia, Austria, Spain, and Britain. One result was the cession of the Rhineland to France by the Treaty of Basel in 1795. Eight years later, in 1803, to compensate the princes of the annexed territories, a set of mediatisations was carried out, which brought about a major redistribution of territorial sovereignty within the Empire. At that time, large parts of Germany were still ruled by Catholic bishops (95.000 km^{2} with more than three million inhabitants). In the mediatisations, the ecclesiastical states were by and large annexed to neighbouring secular principalities. Only three survived as nonsecular states: the Archbishopric of Regensburg, which was raised from a bishopric with the incorporation of the Archbishopric of Mainz, and the lands of the Teutonic Knights and Knights of Saint John.

Monasteries and abbeys lost their means of existence as they had to abandon their lands.

== Rising Liberalism and the Roman Catholic Church ==
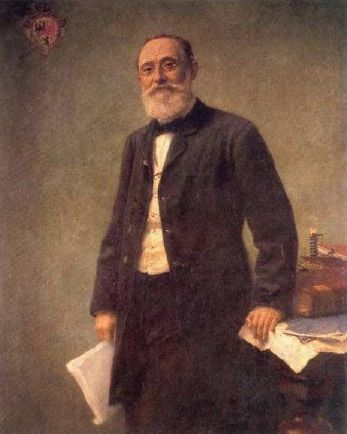
The term "Kulturkampf" gained widespread currency after pathologist and member of the parliament of the Deutsche Fortschrittspartei (Progressive Liberals) Rudolf Virchow used it on January 17, 1873, to characterize the struggle between the liberal state and the Catholic Church.

The secularization of society became a main theme of European history in the 18th and especially 19th century and was vehemently opposed by the Catholic Church, resulting in a struggle which was later termed “Kulturkampf”.

In Germany, this process had its first culmination in the German revolutions of 1848–49 and, after their suppression, gained new momentum with the establishment of liberal governments in various German states in the 1850s and 1860s and in the empire in the 1870s. The Catholic Church, an outspoken opponent of Liberalism, had opposed German unification under predominantly Protestant Prussian leadership, and the Prussian minister-president and German Chancellor Bismarck accused the Church of promoting nationalism among the Catholic Polish minority. Therefore, he regarded the Church as a threat to the newly founded empire, especially after establishment of a Catholic political party which became a strong opposition in parliament. The Liberals, particularly in light of new Catholic dogmas promulgated under Pope Pius IX at the First Vatican Council (1869-70), had always considered the Catholic Church as an enemy of progress.

Laws enacted in the state of Prussia and in the empire in the early 1870s to curb Catholic influence in public affairs met with open resistance of the Church, leading to heated public debates in the media and in the parliaments during which the term “Kulturkampf” gained widespread currency. Diplomatic ties with the Vatican were cut and additional laws were passed to quell Catholic opposition. This only resulted in more support by the Catholic population and more resistance by the Church. During the Kulturkampf, four bishops and 185 priests in defiance of the laws were tried and imprisoned and many more were fined or went into exile.

On July 13, 1874, in the town of Bad Kissingen, the Catholic Eduard Kullmann attempted to assassinate Bismarck, naming the church laws as the reason for the attack.

After the death of Pius IX in 1878, Bismarck took up negotiations with the more conciliatory Pope Leo XIII who proclaimed the end of the Kulturkampf on May 23, 1887. A few of the Kulturkampf laws were repealed and others toned down, but the heart of the legislation referring to education, marriage, Jesuits, politics from the pulpit, or religious disassociation remained.

Also in 1878, the Augustinus-Verein association was formed, with the objective of supporting and promoting the Catholic press in Germany.

== Catholicism and the Third Reich ==
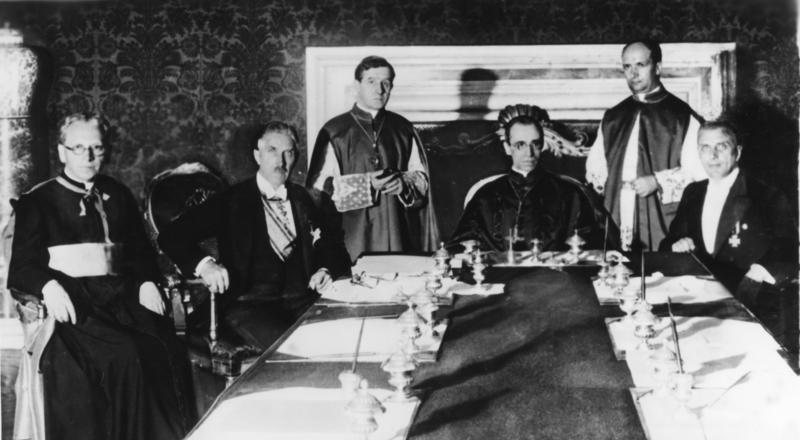
The signing of the Reichskonkordat on July 20, 1933, in Rome. (From left to right: German prelate Ludwig Kaas, German Vice-Chancellor Franz von Papen, Monsignor Giuseppe Pizzardo, Cardinal Secretary of State Pacelli, Monsignor Alfredo Ottaviani, and German ambassador Rudolf Buttmann)

Adolf Hitler was raised as a Catholic, a faith which he rejected as an adolescent, only receiving confirmation unwillingly and never receiving the sacraments again after finishing his teenage years. Even before he rose to power, the Catholic Church was in opposition to Nazism, because this ideology was deemed incompatible with Christian morals. Therefore, under threat of excommunication Catholics were forbidden to join the Nazi Party (NSDAP) or its organizations. The leaders of the NSDAP for their part shared the church's view about the incompatibility of national socialism and Christianity. Indeed, Hitler had a general covert plan, which some say existed even before the Nazis' rise to power, to destroy Christianity within the Reich, which was to be accomplished through control and subversion of the churches and to be completed after the war.

However, many Catholics, like other large sections of German society, thought Hitler to be an opportunity to stop the (larger) evil of Communism and socialism. The Nazi party seemed to be an ally and the Church's ban on joining the NSDAP was lifted in 1933 with the Reichskonkordat between the German government and the Holy See.

In 1937, Pope Pius XI in the encyclical Mit brennender Sorge (composed in German instead of the Church's official language, Latin), condemned Nazi ideology, notably the Gleichschaltung policy directed against religious influence upon education and the Nazi elevation of race. Pius XI planned to strengthen these criticisms by issuing another encyclical, Humani generis unitas, a draft for which specifically condemned racism and anti-Semitism, but his death in 1939 preempted that action. Massive Catholic opposition to the euthanasia program, led by Clemens von Galen, made the Nazi Party interrupt it in 1941 temporarily. As for Nazi anti-Semitism, only sporadically did German Catholics mount opposition to it in an active and open manner. Von Galen, for example, campaigned against "Aryan" Germans being murdered in euthanasia programs, but not against German Jews being murdered. Notable for voicing concern for the Jews was the bishop of Berlin, Konrad von Preysing, and his assistant, Bernhard Lichtenberg, who died on his way to Dachau. In 1943, for example, von Preysing asked Pope Pius XII to plead for German Jews confronted by deportation, but the pope felt it was inadvisable to do so. And Lichtenberg, for his part, raised concern for the plight of the Jews as early as 1938 and continued to pray publicly for them until his death five years later. The other notable German Catholic who aided Jews as well as Catholics of Jewish background was Dr. Margarete Sommer, who headed the official relief agency of the Berlin diocese. Although a few German priests and parishioners were sent to concentration camps for opposing Nazism, most escaped that fate. Polish priests, however, in large numbers were sent to Dachau and other camps. For example, of the 2579 Catholic priests interned in the "priestblock" at Dachau, 1780 were Polish, of whom 868 died. Although a number of European Catholics openly opposed the Nazis, especially from Poland, France, and Lithuania, the German bishops generally advised against it except when the Nazi state broke the Concordat of 1933 and directly challenged the institutional church, threatening its policies and putting its pastoral programs in jeopardy. Then they protested (through letters, sermons, etc.), often posing, from a Nazi perspective, a serious threat.

The Nazis saw themselves as a replacement of Catholicism that would coopt its cohesion and respect for hierarchy. In 1941 the Nazi authorities began to dissolve all monasteries and abbeys through occupation and secularization by the Allgemeine SS. But the same year this Aktion Klostersturm (Operation Storm the Monasteries) was stopped because Hitler feared the increasing protests by the Catholic part of the German population. If these were to result in passive rebellions, the Nazi war effort at the eastern front would be harmed.

== Catholicism in the German Democratic Republic ==
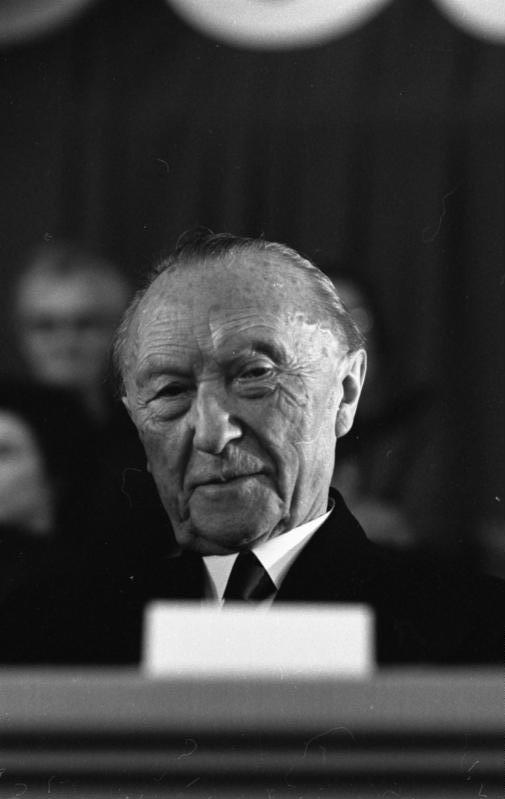
Konrad Adenauer, a practicing Catholic, based the political program of his centrist Christian-Democratic party CDU on a blend of the liberal-democratic tradition and Catholic social teaching.

After World War II the Catholics in the zone occupied by the Soviet army found themselves under a militantly atheist government. Many parishes were cut off from their dioceses in the western part of Germany.

The Soviet zone eventually declared itself a sovereign state, the German Democratic Republic (GDR). The GDR's constitution proclaimed the freedom of religious belief, but in reality the new state tried to abolish religion.

Most of the people in the territory of the German Democratic Republic were Protestants. With exception of the Eichsfeld, a small Catholic region in the northwestern part of Thuringia, which was a former property of the archdiocese of Mainz, Catholics were a small minority right from the start of Communist rule. In contrast to the Protestant churches, the Catholic Church endured the Communist order relatively unscathed. In 1950, 13% of the population were Catholics (versus 85% Protestants). Although about 1.1 million citizens, half of East Germany's Catholic population, left the GDR, in 1989 there were still about one million Catholics, about 6% of the population (versus 25% Protestants). The circumstance of being a tiny minority proved to be a substantial advantage. In the government's view, the population of Protestants was high enough to potentially endanger the atheistic state if it were to mobilize itself. Therefore, the system's main efforts to fight religion concentrated on Protestantism. As a result, the majority of atheists and agnostics registered in Germany today (29.6% in religion in Germany) are in the former East Germany.

The Protestant churches drew strong repression for a historical reason as well. The Protestant churches had had strong connections to most of the former political states (empires, etc.) that had over the centuries ruled one or another part of the territory of the GDR, while the Catholic Church had kept its distance from them (and they had kept their distance from the Catholic Church, as seen during the kulturkampf). The Catholic Church was thus used to existing without the help and even against the hostility of the state.

== The present situation of Catholicism in Germany ==
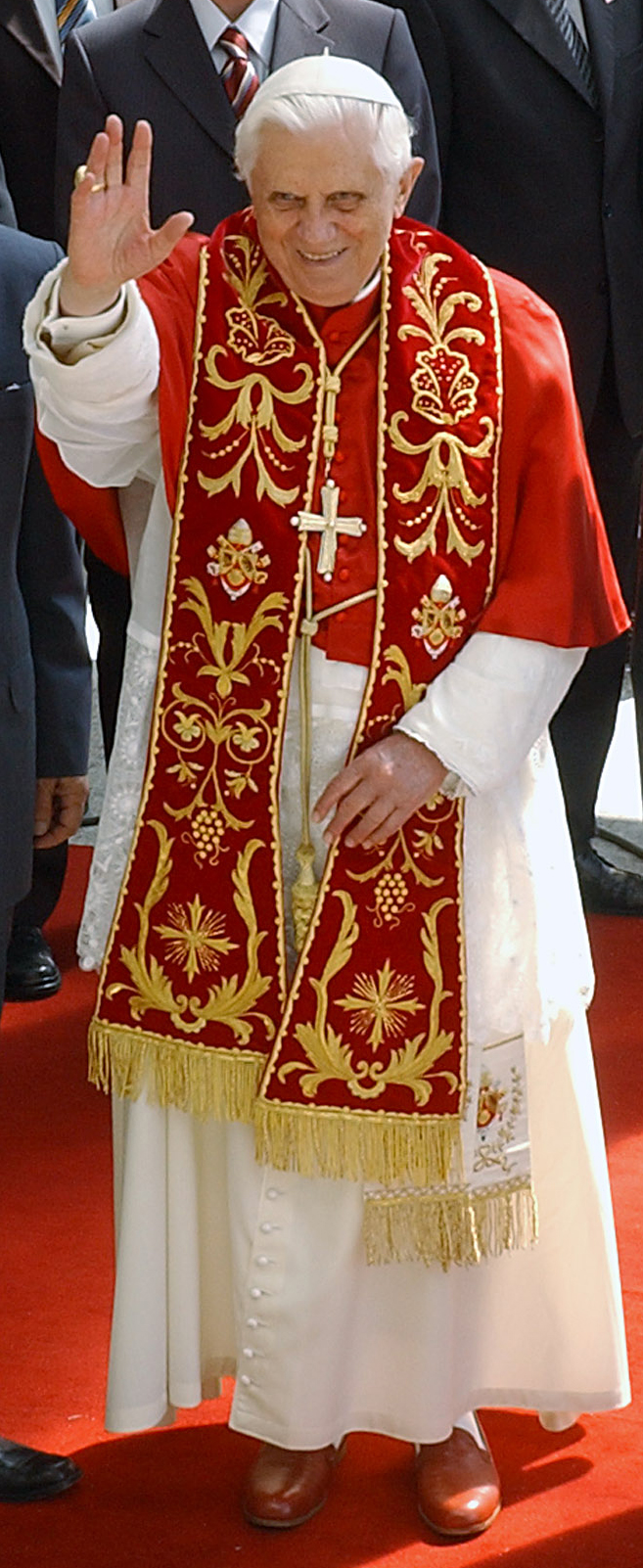
Pope Benedict XVI has been heard to say: "My vocation is to the world, but my heart beats Bavarian".

Nowadays, the two Bundesländer where Catholics constitute the majority of the German population are Bavaria (south) (with as per 31 Dec 2006, 57.2% of the Bavarian population being Catholics), and the smallish Saarland (west) (with 64.9% Catholics again as of 31 Dec 2006). Catholicism is also predominant, and historically of cultural and political influence, in the Rheinland part of Nordrhein-Westfalen. Besides these Bundesländer there are areas of lesser significance of Catholic majority.

The state supports both the Catholic and Protestant churches, with each church making up about a third of the population. The state collects taxes for the churches and there is religious education in the schools, taught by teachers who have to be approved by the churches. Church taxes are "automatic paycheck deductions" taken from all registered church members, "regardless of how often members attend services."

Catholicism in Germany today faces several problems:

- Traditionally, there were regions with Catholic majorities and areas of Protestant majorities (Protestant 34%, Roman Catholic 34%). The mobility of modern society began to mix the population. Interconfessional married couples face the problem of not being able to share the same communion.
- Modern society is changing old structures. Catholic environments are disintegrating, though not as much in traditional regions like Bavaria. The number of Catholic churchgoers has decreased (from 22% in 1990 to 14% in 2006) and many have left the church altogether.
