= Konrad Mutian =

German Renaissance humanist (1470–1526)

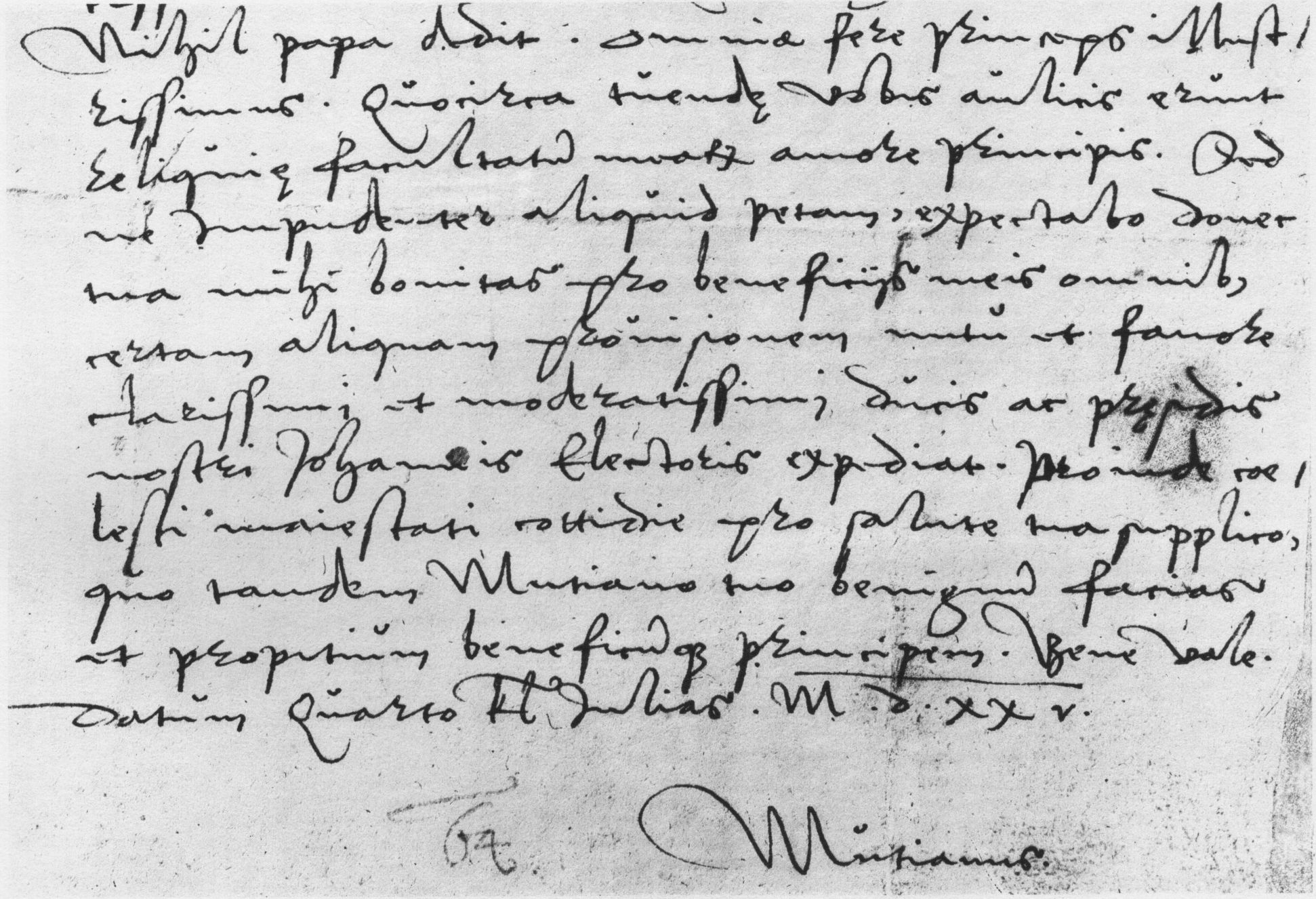
Excerpt from a letter from Mutianus Rufus dated June 28, 1525. Nürnberg, Germanisches Nationalmuseum, Nr. 48

Konrad Mutian (Latin: Conradus Mutianus; 15 October 1470 – 30 March 1526) was a German Renaissance humanist.

== Biography ==
He was born in Homburg of well-to-do parents named Muth, and was subsequently known as Konrad Mutianus Rufus from his red hair.

At Deventer under Alexander Hegius he had Erasmus as school-fellow; proceeding (1486) to the university of Erfurt, he took the master's degree in 1492. From 1495 he travelled in Italy, taking the doctor's degree in Canon law at Bologna. Returning in 1502, the landgraf of Hesse promoted him to high office. The post was not congenial; he resigned it (1503) for a small salary as canonicus in Gotha.

Mutian was a man of great influence in a select circle especially connected with the university of Erfurt, and known as the Mutianischer Bund, which included Helius Eobanus Hessus, Crotus Rubeanus, Justus Jonas and other leaders of independent thought. He had no public ambition; except in correspondence, and as an epigrammatist, he was no writer, but he furnished ideas to those who wrote. He took from Petrarch his emphasis on leading a good life and believed religion should stress ethics over theology.

He may deserve the title which has been given him as "precursor of the Reformation," insofar as he desired the reform of the Church based on the writings of St. Paul, but not the establishment of a rival. Like Erasmus, he was with Luther in his early stage, but deserted him in his later development. Though he had personally no hand in it, the Epistolae obscurorum virorum (due especially to Crotus Rubeanus) was the outcome of the Reuchlinists in his Bund. He died at Gotha on 30 March (Good Friday) 1526.

== Neoplatonism ==
Mutian was deeply influenced by Neoplatonic mysticism, and wrote in a letter to a friend:

There is but one god and one goddess, but many are their powers and names: Jupiter, Sol, Apollo, Moses, Christus, Luna, Ceres, Proserpina, Tellus, Maria. But have a care in speaking these things. They should be hidden in silence as are the Eleusinian mysteries; sacred things must needs be wrapped in fable and enigma. ...You, since Jupiter, the Best and Greatest God, is propitious to you, may despise lesser gods in silence. When I say Jupiter, understand me to mean Christ and the true God.

== Literature ==
- F W Kampschulte, Die Universität Erfurt (1858-1860)
- K Krause, Eobanus Hessus (1879)
- L Geiger, in Allgemeine Deutsche Biog. (1886)
- K Krause, Der Briefwechsel des Mutianus Rufus (1885)
- K Gillert, Der Briefwechsel des Conradus Mutianus (1890)Der briefwechsel des Conradus Mutianus.
- Heinrich Grimm (1997). "Mutianus Rufus". Neue Deutsche Biographie (in German). Vol. 18. Berlin: Duncker & Humblot. pp. 656–657. (full text online).
- Christoph Fasbender, Eckhard Bernstein: "Conradus Mutianus Rufus und der Humanismus in Erfurt". Gotha 2009, ISBN 978-3-910027-25-1
- Eckhard Bernstein: "Mutianus Rufus und sein humanistischer Freundeskreis in Gotha", Böhlau Verlag Köln/Weimar/Wien 2014, ISBN 978-3-412-22342-7
