= Alexander Hegius von Heek =

German humanist

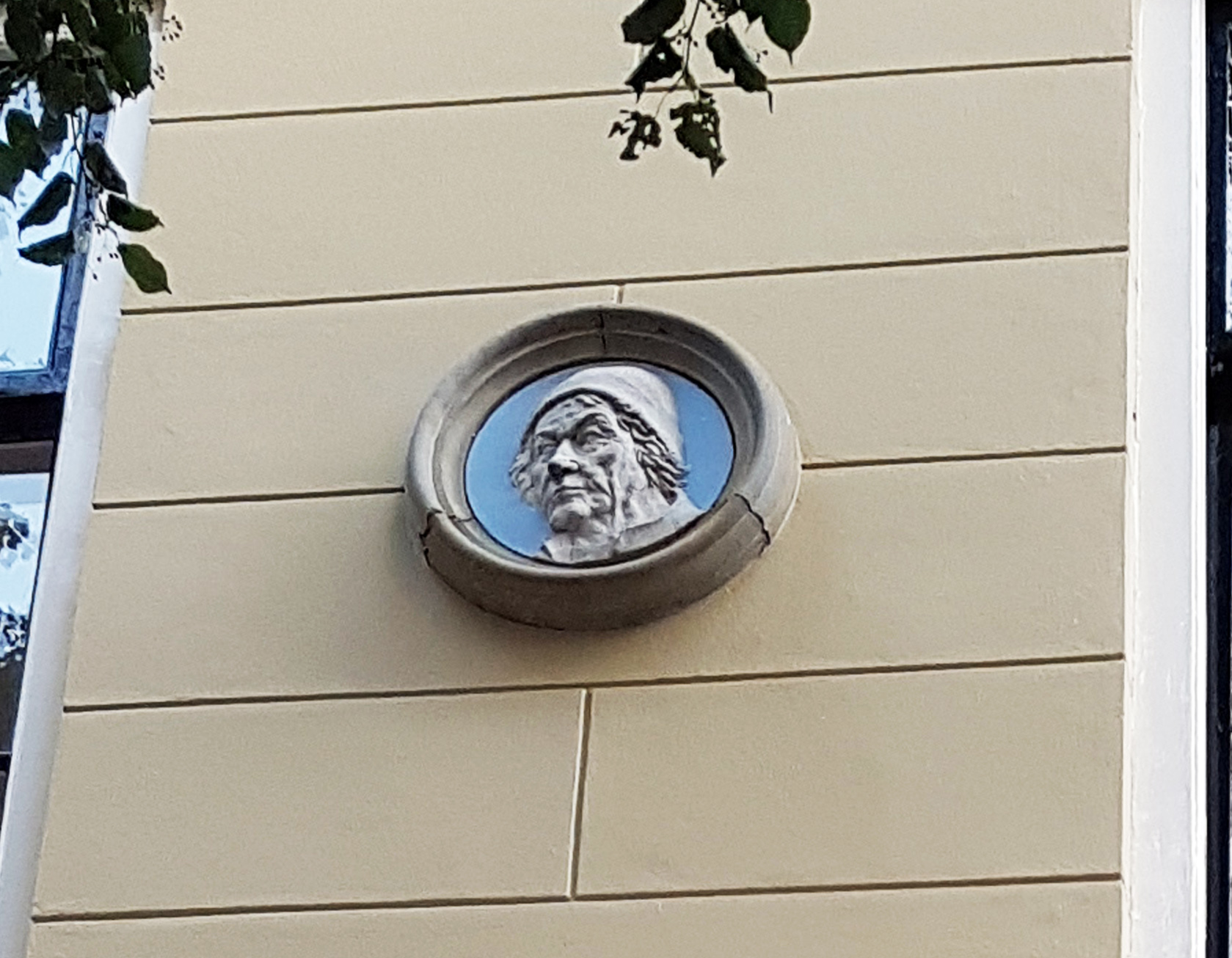
Medallion with a conjectural portrait of Alexander Hegius, located in the facade of the Latin school in Deventer

Alexander Hegius von Heek (c. 1439/1440 – 27 December 1498) was a German humanist, so called from his birthplace Heek (located near Ahaus, then in the Prince-Bishopric of Münster). (Note: Other sources indicate Burgsteinfurt, County of Steinfurt as his place of birth.)

== Biography ==
Hegius learned, likely in Emmerich am Rhein, Greek from Rodolphus Agricola. In 1474 he settled down at Deventer in the Netherlands, where he either founded or succeeded to the headship of a school, which became famous for the number of its distinguished alumni. First and foremost of these was Erasmus; others were Hermann von dem Busche and Murmellius, the missionaries of humanism, Conrad Goclenius (Gockelen), Conrad Mutianus (Muth von Mudt) and Frans van Cranevelt.

His writings, consisting of short poems, philosophical essays, grammatical notes and letters, were published after his death by his pupil Jacobus Faber. They display considerable knowledge of Latin, but less of Greek, on the value of which he strongly insisted.

Hegius's chief claim to be remembered rests not upon his published works, but upon his services in the cause of humanism. He succeeded in abolishing the old-fashioned medieval textbooks and methods of instruction, and led his pupils to the study of the classical authors themselves. His generosity in assisting poor students exhausted a considerable fortune, and at his death he left nothing but his books and clothes.

Hegius died in Deventer.
