= Johannes Murmellius =

Dutch teacher and humanist

Johannes Murmellius (c. 1480 – 2 October 1517) was a Dutch teacher and humanist, known for numerous textbooks, and his spreading of humanism, particularly in the Prince-Bishopric of Münster.

== Life ==
He was born in Roermond, and was a pupil of Alexander Hegius von Heek in Deventer. From 1496 to 1500 he was at the University of Cologne. Then with the support of Rudolph von Langen he was brought in as assistant head of the cathedral school at Münster. After friction with the head, he moved to another school there, reforming textbooks and promoting the teaching of Greek. Pupils travelled from distant parts of Europe to study with him.

He was then school rector in Alkmaar from 1513, where he insisted his pupils had a good reading knowledge of parts of the Bible. The marauding Arumer Zwarte Hoop sacked Alkmaar in late June 1517, leaving Murmellius destitute. Nowadays, a school in Alkmaar is named after him as the Murmellius Gymnasium.

He moved on to Zwolle, briefly working under Gerardus Listrius, and then to a position at Deventer. He died suddenly in early October 1517, giving rise to an unsubstantiated rumour that Listrius had poisoned him.

== Works ==
Around 50 works of his are known, mostly written with pedagogical intent.

He published an edition of the Consolation of Philosophy of Boethius in 1511, followed in 1514 by a commentary.

His Pappa Puerorum (1515) was a very successful Latin primer, and his Latin Lexicon was influential as far away as Hungary.
