= Helius Eobanus Hessus =

German Latin poet and Lutheran humanist

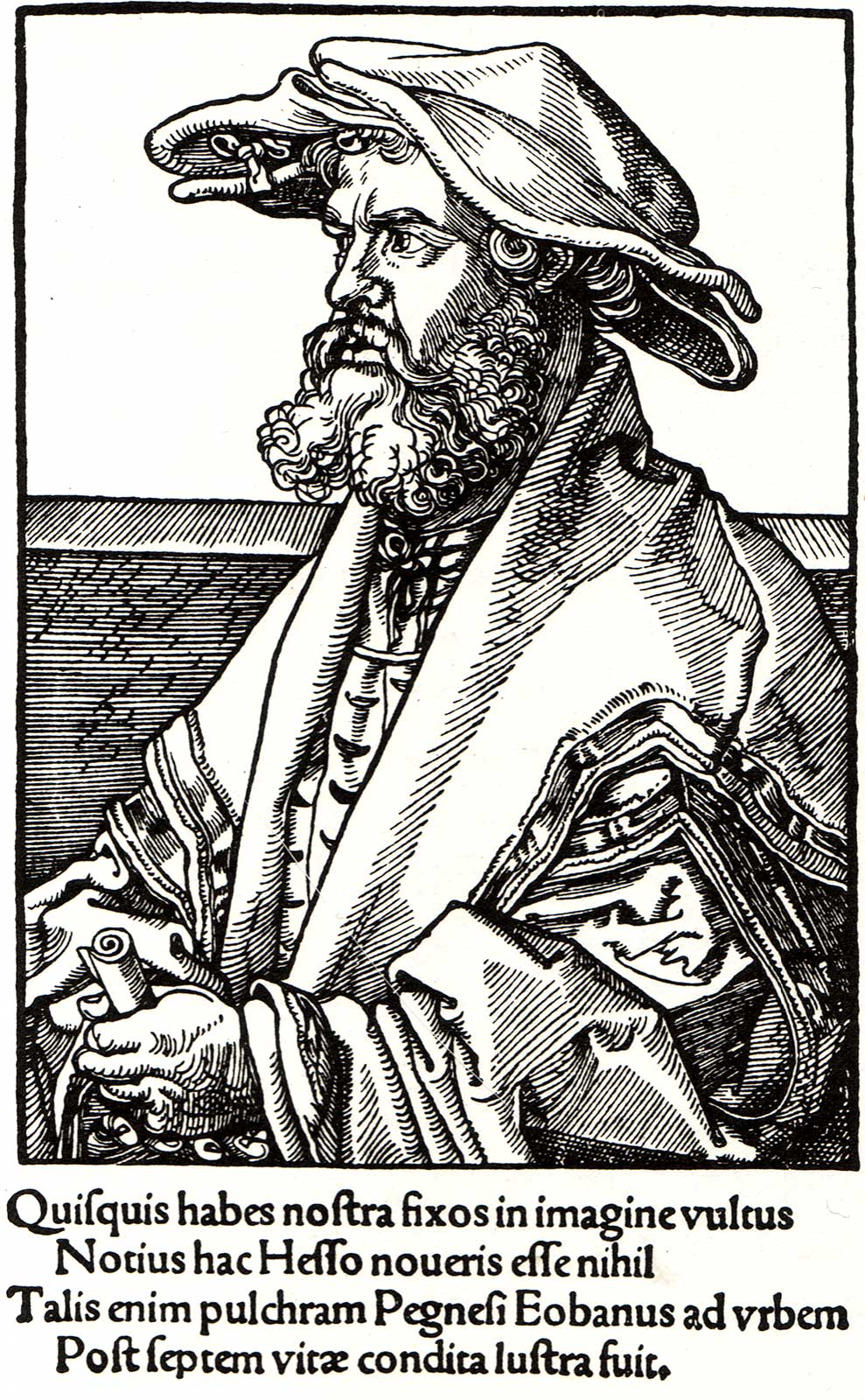
Helius Eobanus Hessus

Helius Eobanus Hessus (6 January 1488 – 5 October 1540) was a German Latin poet and later a Lutheran humanist. He was born at Halgehausen in Hesse-Kassel (or Hesse-Cassel).

His family name is said to have been Koch; Eoban was the name of a local saint; Hessus indicates the land of his birth, Helius the fact that he was born on Sunday. He visited a Latin school in Frankenberg, Hesse. His teacher and travel guide was Ludwig Stippius (Christiani), confidant of Martin Luther, to whom Hessus dedicated his first idyl in 1509. In 1504 Hessus entered the University of Erfurt, and soon after his graduation was appointed rector of the school of St Severus. This post he soon lost, and spent the years 1509–1513 at the court of the bishop of Riesenburg.

Returning to Erfurt, he was reduced to great straits by his drunken and irregular habits. At length (in 1517) he was appointed professor of Latin in the university. He was prominently associated with the distinguished men of the time (Johann Reuchlin, Konrad Peutinger, Ulrich von Hutten, Konrad Mutianus), and took part in the political, religious and literary quarrels of the period, finally declaring in favor of Luther and the Reformation for the rest of his life.

The university was seriously weakened by the growing popularity of the new University of Wittenberg, and Hessus endeavoured (but without success) to gain a living by the practice of medicine. Through the influence of Camerarius and Melanchthon, he obtained a post at Nuremberg (1526), but, finding a regular life distasteful, he again went back to Erfurt (1533). But it was not the Erfurt he had known; his old friends were dead or had left the place; the university was deserted. A lengthy poem gained him the favor of the Landgrave of Hesse, by whom he was summoned in 1536 as professor of poetry and history to Marburg, where he died.

Hessus, who was considered the foremost Latin poet of his age, was a facile verse-maker, but not a true poet. He wrote what he thought was likely to pay or secure him the favor of some important person. He wrote local, historical and military poems, idylls, epigrams and occasional pieces, collected under the title of Sylvae. His most popular works were translations of the Psalms into Latin distichs (which reached over fifty editions) and of the Iliad into hexameters. His most original poem was the Heroides in imitation of Ovid, consisting of letters from holy women, from the Virgin Mary down to Kunigunde, wife of the Emperor Henry II.

His Epistolae were edited by his friend Camerarius, who also wrote his life (1553). There are later accounts of him by M. Hertz (1860), G. Schwertzell (1874) and C. Krause (1879); see also D. F. Strauss, Ulrich von Hutten (Eng. trans., 1874). His poems on Nuremberg and other towns have been edited with commentaries and 16th-century illustrations by J. Neff and V. von Loga in M. Herrmann and S. Szarnatolski's Lateinische Literaturdenkmäler des XV. u. XVI. Jahrhunderts (Berlin, 1896).
