= Rodolphus Agricola =

15th-century Dutch humanist

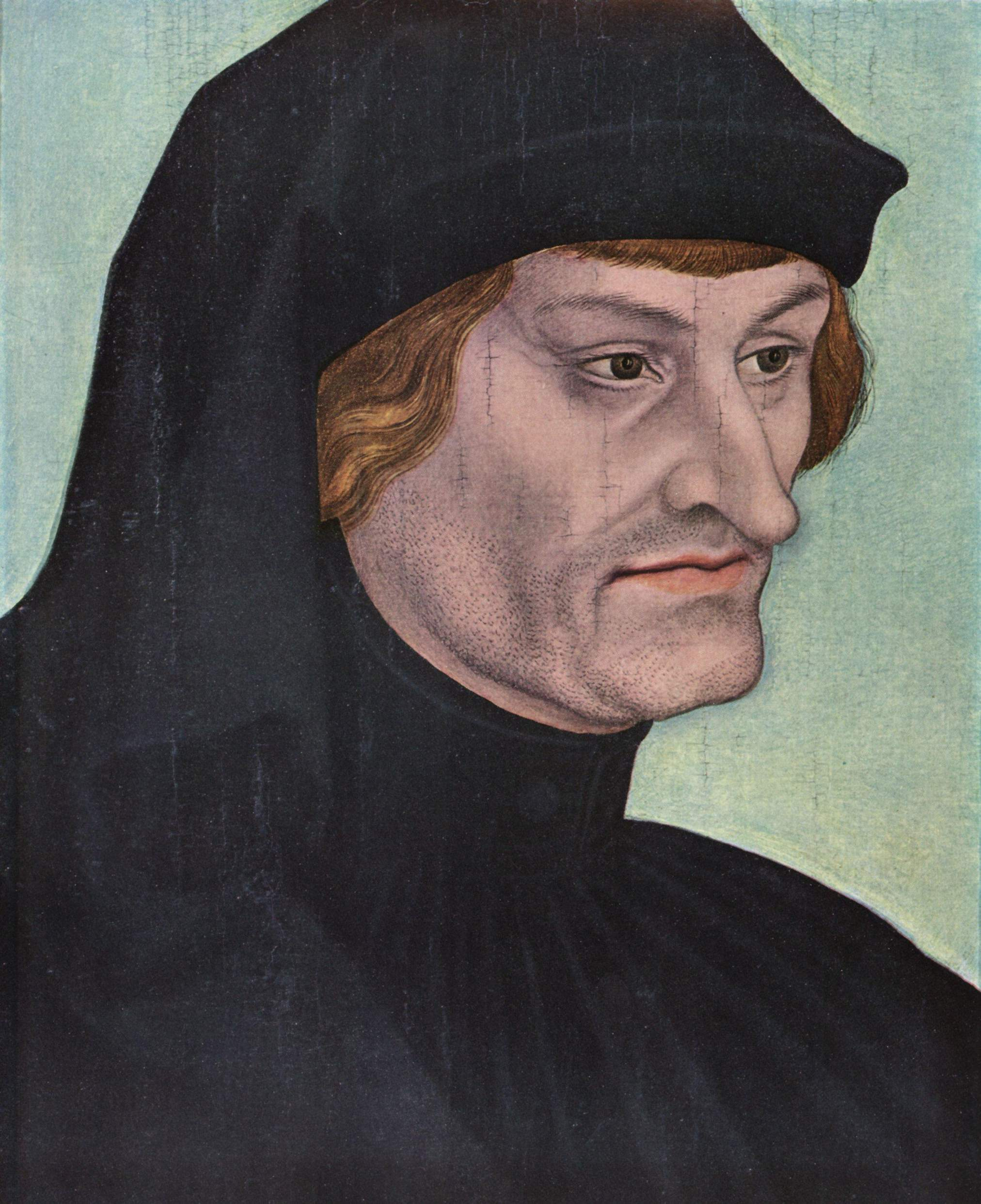
Portrait of Rudolph Agricola by Lucas Cranach the Elder, ca. 1532

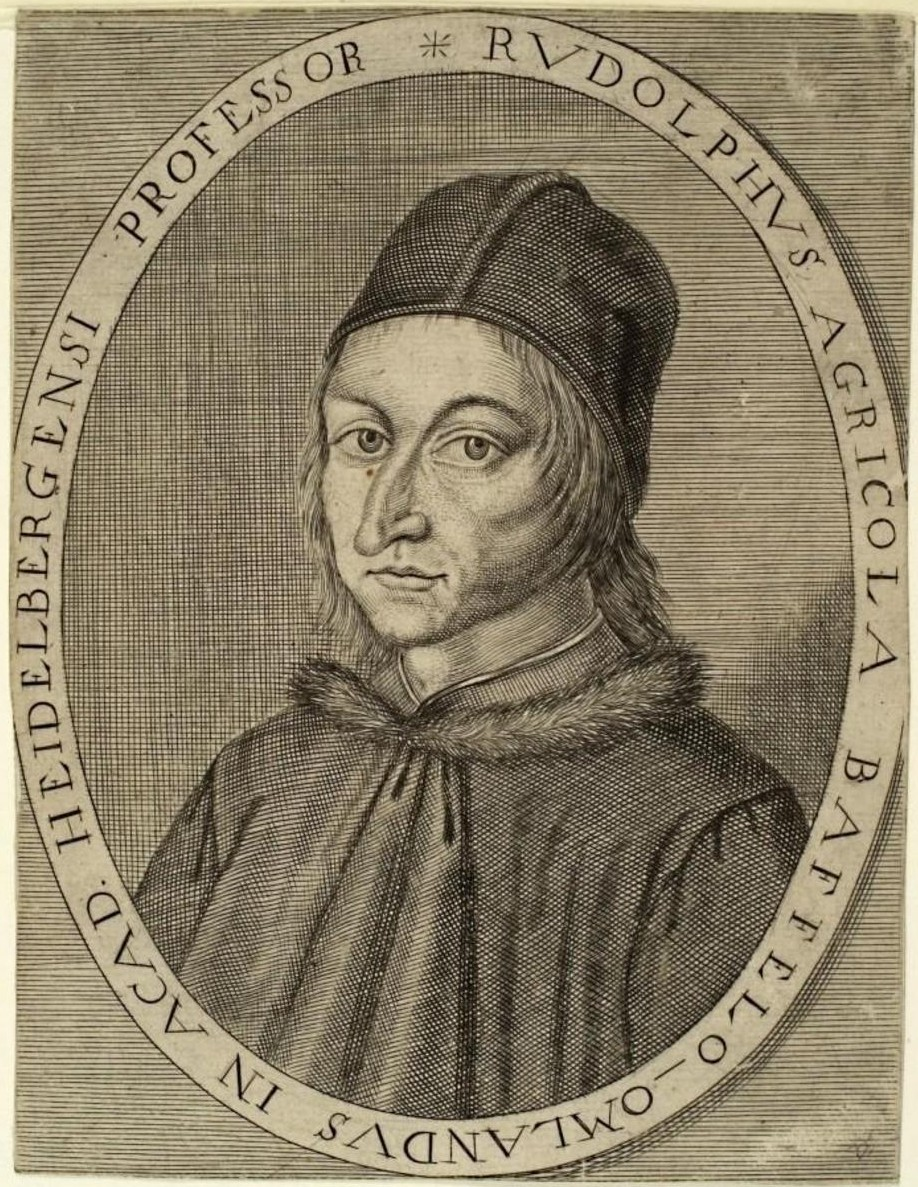
Rodolphus Agricola

Rodolphus Agricola (August 28, 1443 (Note: Different birth dates have been suggested for Agricola. After detailed analysis, scholar Fokke Akkerman believes that August 28, 1443 best fits the available evidence.) – October 27, 1485) was a Dutch humanist scholar recognized as the "father of Northern European humanism" for his role in introducing the Italian Renaissance's intellectual disciplines to the North. Known for his mastery of Latin, Greek, and Hebrew, he was a versatile figure who excelled as an organist, poet, and orator, though he preferred the life of an independent scholar over institutional ties. His most important work, De inventione dialectica (1479), influenced the field of logic by shifting the focus from rigid scholastic reasoning to practical argumentation and rhetoric, profoundly impacting later thinkers like Erasmus, who regarded him as a "truly divine man."

== Name ==
Agricola originally took his mother's surname and was named Roelof Huisman. Later, in typical Renaissance humanist fashion, he Latinized his name as Rodolphus Agricola, where Agricola is the Latin translation of Huisman, roughly the Dutch equivalent of 'farmer'. He was also known as Rodolphus Agricola Phrisius, where the Latin adjective Phrisius identifies him as a Frisian.

== Biography ==
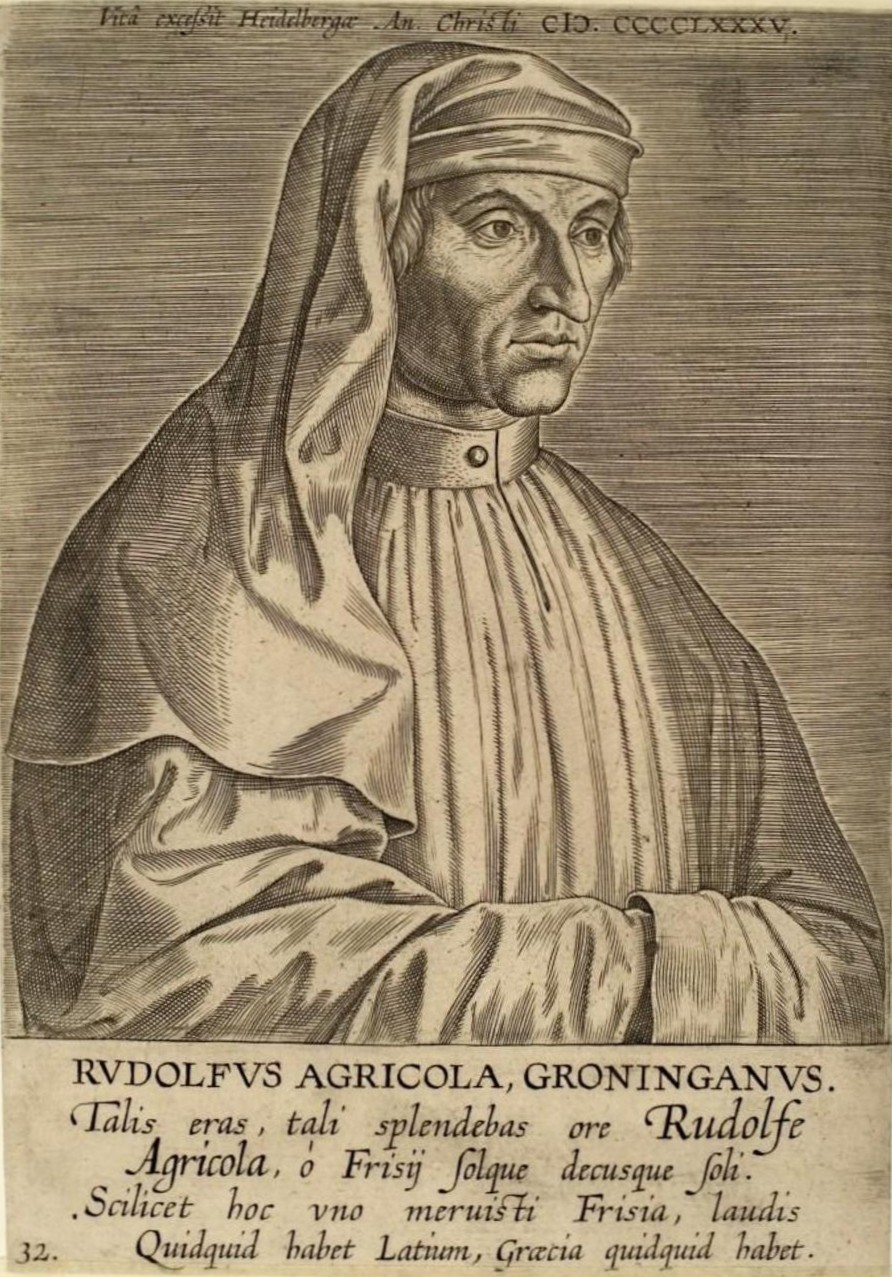
Rodolphus Agricola

Agricola was born in Baflo in the Dutch province of Groningen as the illegitimate son of the cleric and future abbot, Hendrik Vries, and Zycka Huesman, from a prosperous farming family.

Educated first by the school of St. Maarten in Groningen, Agricola matriculated at the University of Erfurt with his father's assistance and received a BA in 1458. He then studied at University of Louvain, receiving an MA in 1465; he was renowned for the purity of his Latin and skill in disputation. He concentrated his studies on Cicero and Quintilian, but also added French and Greek to his ever-growing list of languages during his university years. At the end of his life, he would learn Hebrew to be able to read the Old Testament, especially the Psalms, unadulterated by translation.

In the 1460s Agricola travelled to Italy, where he became associated with humanist masters and statesmen. From circa 1468 until 1475, he studied civil law at the University of Pavia and later went to Ferrara (1475–1479). There, he became the protégé of Prince d'Este of Ferrara, and was a pupil of Theodor Gaza and attended lectures by Battista Guarino. He devoted himself to the study of classical texts and gained fame for the elegance of his Latin style and his knowledge of philosophy. While in Ferrara, Agricola gained formal employment as the organist to the opulent ducal chapel. He held that post until 1479, after which he returned to the North, becoming secretary to the city of Groningen. Here, at the Cistercian Abbey of St Bernard at Aduard, near Groningen, and at 's-Heerenberg near Emmerich am Rhein in the south-east, he was at the center of a group of scholars and humanists, with whom he kept up a lively exchange of letters. His correspondents included the musician and choirmaster of Antwerp Jacobus Barbirianus (Barbireau), rector of the Latin School at Deventer Alexander Hegius and Johannes Reuchlin, the humanist scholar and later student of Hebrew.

Once in Germany again, he spent time in Dillingen, where he continued to correspond with humanist friends and colleagues throughout Europe. In correspondence, he primarily advocated for his project to promote the study of classical learning and the Studia humanitatis. Agricola remained an independent scholar, unattached to a university or religious establishment. This independence became a hallmark of humanist scholars. In 1479, Agricola completed his De inventione dialectica (On Dialectical Invention) in Dillingen, which argued for the precise application of loci in scholarly argumentation.

From 1480 to 1484 he held the post of secretary of the city of Groningen.

In 1481, Agricola spent six months in Brussels at the court of Archduke Maximilian (later Maximilian I, the Holy Roman Emperor). Friends attempted to dissuade him from accepting the archduke's patronage as they feared that the archduke's influence would undermine his philosophical ideals. He also declined the offer to become the head of a Latin school at Antwerp.

In 1484, Agricola moved to Heidelberg by invitation of Johann von Dalberg, the Bishop of Worms. The two men had met in Pavia, and they became close friends in Heidelberg. The bishop was a generous benefactor of learning. At this time Agricola began studying Hebrew, and he is said to have prepared a translation of the Psalms. The translation was never published and has been lost.

In 1485, Dalberg was sent as an ambassador to Pope Innocent VIII in Rome, with Agricola accompanying him; the latter was struck gravely ill on their journey. He died shortly after their return to Heidelberg and Ermolao Barbaro composed an epitaph for him.

== Legacy ==
De inventione dialectica was influential in creating a place for logic in rhetorical studies and was of significance in the education of early humanists. It was a critical and systematic treatment of ideas and concepts related to dialectics.

The significance of De inventione dialectica for the history of argumentation is that it assimilated the art of dialectic to that of rhetoric. Argumentation focused not on truth but on what might be said with reason. Accordingly, Agricola focused on the Topics rather than the Analytics of Aristotle and on Cicero, but also on the writings of historians, poets, and orators. Thus, for Agricola, dialectic was an open field; the art of finding "whatever can be said with any degree of probability on any subject." (Hamilton, David. From Dialectic to Didactic).

In his work, De inventione dialectica, Agricola made the observation: "I have seen an individual, deaf from birth, and of consequence dumb, who could understand what was written to him by others, and could also express his own thoughts by writing." This was the earliest positive record on the education of a deaf person.

Agricola's De formando studio—his long letter on a private educational program—was printed as a small booklet and influenced pedagogy of the early sixteenth century.

Agricola was also important for his personal influence over others. Erasmus admired Agricola, eulogizing him in "Adagia" and calling him "the first to bring a breath of better literature from Italy." Erasmus claimed him as a father/teacher figure and may have met him through his own schoolmaster Alexander Hegius (most probably one of Agricola's students) at Hegius's School in Deventer. In addition to Hegius, Agricola's students include Conrad Celtis (in Heidelberg).

Erasmus made it his personal mission to ensure that several of Agricola's major works were printed posthumously. Agricola's literary executor was Adolphus Occo, a physician of Augsburg. By about 1530 disciples and followers had gathered the manuscripts left by Agricola, and these were edited by Alardus of Amsterdam.

== Works ==
- De Inventione Dialectica libri tres (1479): This is the work for which Agricola is particularly known. There is a modern edition (and translation into German) by Lothar Mundt, Rudolf Agricola. De inventione dialectica libri tres (Tübingen: Niemeyer, 1992). Parts are translated into English in McNally, J. R. (1967). "Rudolph Agricola's De inventione dialectica libri tres: A Translation of Selected Chapters". Speech Monographs. 34 (4): 393–422. doi:10.1080/03637756709375551..
- Letters: The letters of Agricola, of which fifty-one survive, offer an interesting insight into the humanist circle to which he belonged. They have been published and translated with extensive notes in: Agricola, Letters; edited by Adrie van der Laan and Fokke Akkerman (2002).
- A Life of Petrarch (Vita Petrarcae / De vita Petrarchae, 1477)
- De nativitate Christi
- De formando studio (= letter 38 [to Jacobus Barbireau of Antwerp on June 7, 1484, when Agricola was in Heidelberg]: see the edition of the letters by Van der Laan / Akkerman, pp. 200–219)
- His minor works include some speeches, poems, translations of Greek dialogues, and commentaries on works by Seneca, Boethius and Cicero
- For a selection of his works with facing French translation: Rodolphe Agricola, Écrits sur la dialectique et l'humanisme, ed. Marc van der Poel (Paris: Honoré Champion, 1997)
- For a bibliography of Agricola's works: Gerda C. Huisman, Rudolph Agricola. A Bibliography of Printed Works and Translations (Nieuwkoop: B. de Graaf, 1985)

== Sources ==
- Agricola, R., from "Three Books Concerning Dialectical Invention." Renaissance Debates on Rhetoric. ed. & trans. W.A. Rebhorn. pp. 42–56. Ithaca, NY: Cornell U P. 2000.
- Hamilton, David. "From Dialectic to Didactic." http://faculty.ed.uiuc.edu/westbury/textcol/HAMILTO1.html
- The History Guide - Renaissance Humanism: https://www.historyguide.org/intellect/humanism.html
- New Advent Catholic Encyclopedia - Rudolph Agricola: https://www.newadvent.org/cathen/01231b.htm
- Rodolphus Agricola Phrisius (1444–1485). Proceedings of the International Conference at the University of Groningen 28–30 October 1985, eds. Fokke Akkerman and Arjo Vanderjagt (Leiden: Brill, 1988).
- Wessel Gansfort (1419–1489) and Northern Humanism, eds. Fokke Akkerman, Gerda Huisman, and Arjo Vanderjagt (Leiden: Brill, 1993).
- Rudolf Agricola 1444-1485. Protagonist des nordeuropäischen Humanismus zum 550. Geburtstag, ed. Wilhelm Kühlman (Bern: Peter Lang, 1994).
- Northern Humanism in European Context. From the 'Adwert Academy' to Ubbo Emmius, ed. Fokke Akkerman, Arjo Vanderjagt, and Adrie van der Laan (Leiden: Brill, 1999).
- Agricola's logic and rhetoric are treated in Peter Mack, Renaissance Argument. Valla and Agricola in the Traditions of Rhetoric and Dialectic, (Leiden: Brill, 1993); see also Ann Moss, Renaissance Truth and the Latin Language Turn (Oxford: Oxford University Press, 2003.
- For Agricola's knowledge of Hebrew: A.J. Vanderjagt, 'Wessel Gansfort (1419–1489) and Rudolph Agricola (1443^{?}-1485): Piety and Hebrew', in Frömmigkeit - Theologie - Frömmigkeitstheologie: Contributions to European Church History. Festschrift für Berndt Hamm zum 60. Geburtstag, ed. Gudrun Litz, Heidrun Munzert, and Roland Liebenberg (Leiden: Brill, 2005), pp. 159–172.
