= Gustavus Waffelaert =

Belgian bishop of Bruges

Gustavus Josephus Waffelaert
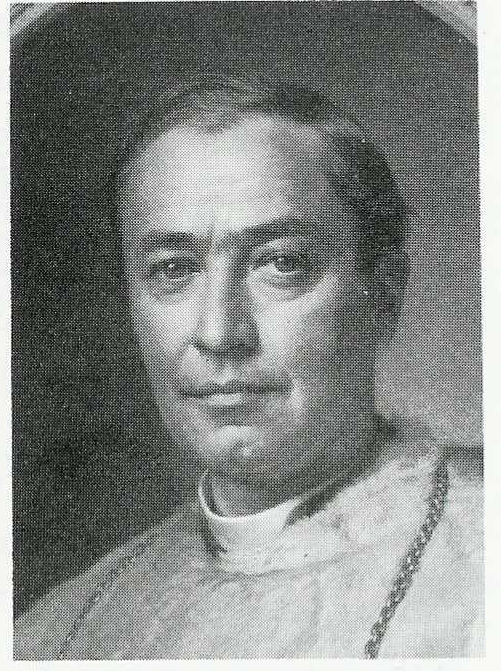
- Bishop Waffelaert at the end of the 19th century
- Church: Catholic Church
- Diocese: Diocese of Bruges
- See: St. Salvator's
- Appointed: June 1895
- Predecessor: Petrus De Brabandere
- Successor: Henricus Lamiroy
- Previous post: Professor of moral theology

Orders
- Ordination: 17 December 1870
- Consecration: 25 July 1895 by Pierre-Lambert Goossens

Personal details
- Born: 27 August 1847 Rollegem, West Flanders, Belgium
- Died: 18 December 1931 (aged 84) Bruges, West Flanders, Belgium
- Denomination: Catholic
- Education: Major Seminary, Bruges
- Alma mater: Catholic University of Leuven
- Motto: Duc nos quo tendimus (Panis angelicus)

Gustave Joseph Waffelaert (1847–1931) was the 22nd bishop of Bruges in Belgium.

== Life ==
Waffelaert was born in Rollegem on 27 August 1847. After attending St Vincent's college, Ypres, and the Minor Seminary, Roeselare (1865–1867) he entered the Major Seminary, Bruges. He was ordained to the priesthood in Bruges on 17 December 1870, and from 1871 to 1875 served as an assistant priest in the parish of Blankenberge.

He was sent to the Catholic University of Leuven for further studies, graduating Doctor of Theology in 1889 with a thesis on doubtful cases in moral theology, De Dubio solvendo in re morali. He was then appointed to teach moral theology at the major seminary in Bruges. In 1890 he served as vicar general and in 1894 was appointed archpriest of the cathedral chapter of St. Salvator's. He was consecrated as bishop of Bruges on 25 July 1895.

During his episcopate, he supported the development and modernisation of Catholic education in his diocese, particularly in vocational and technical fields, and encouraged the establishment of the Revue pratique de l'Enseignement in 1896. In line with developing Catholic social teaching he favoured a range of social apostolates, such as mutual insurance societies, savings unions, employment brokerages, trade unions, agricultural cooperatives, and youth work, but wished to ensure that these remained under clerical rather than lay leadership. He also opposed the emergence of Daensism and Christian Democracy, warning against their "fallacious promises" in an 1896 pastoral letter, and refusing Arthur Verhaegen permission for a meeting of the Lige démocratique in Bruges in 1899.

He received the pallium on 21 May 1920. In 1929, Henricus Lamiroy was appointed his coadjutor bishop, to succeed him upon his death. Waffelaert died in Bruges on 18 December 1931. Originally buried in the city's cemetery, in 2002 his remains were transferred to the crypt of Bruges Cathedral.

== Writings ==
Waffelaert was a contributor to the Nouvelle Revue théologique, the Dictionnaire apologétique de la foi chrétienne, Science catholique, Revue d'Ascétique et de Mystique, and Collationes Brugenses, which he founded. His other writings include:

- Étude de théologie morale sur l'obligation en conscience des lois civiles (Tournai, 1884)
- Tractatus de virtutibus cardinalibus (3 vols., Bruges, 1885–1889)
- Étude de théologie morale sur la coopération sur tout en matière politique et religieuse (2nd edition, Bruges, 1892)
- Exposé sommaire des principes généraux de la science sociale devant servir d'introduction a l'intelligence de l'encyclique Rerum Novarum sur la condition des ouvriers (Bruges, 1894)
- Sommaire d'un cours de pédagogie d'après les auteurs modernes les plus compétents (Bruges, 1883)
- Herderlijke brief (Bruges, 1896)
- Meditationes Theologicae
  - Meditationes Theologicae: Goddelijke Beschouwingen, translated by Guido Gezelle (1897)
  - Méditations théologiques: Exposé scientifique du dogme catholique (2 vols., Bruges, 1921)
- Eening der minnende ziel met God of Handleiding tot de christelijke volmaaktheid (Bruges, 1916)
- De Geestelijke Duif opvliegende Godewaerts of de drie Baanvakken van de weg der Volmaaktheid (Bruges, 1918)
  - La colombe spirituelle prenant un essor vers Dieu, ou: Les trois voies du chemin de la perfection (1919)
- Grondwetten en levensregel voor de zusters der kloostergemeenten van het bisdom van Brugge (Bruges, 1927)
