= Johan Joseph Faict =

Catholic bishop from Bruges in the 19th century

The Most Reverend Jean Joseph Monsignor Faict
- Bishop; Bishop of Bruges
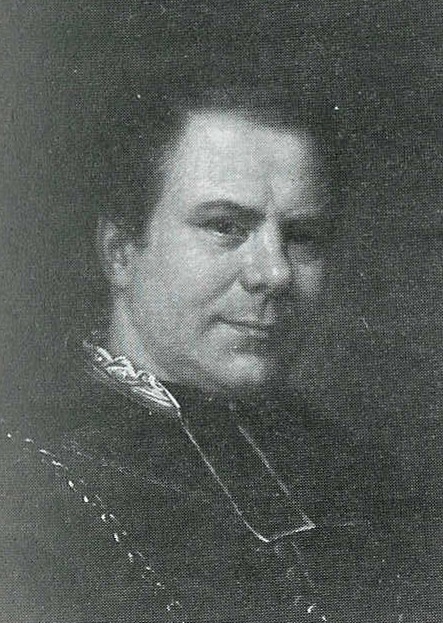
- Bishop Jan Jozef Faict of Bruges (1864-1894)
- Church: Roman Catholic Church
- Archdiocese: Roman Catholic Archdiocese of Mechelen-Brussels
- Province: Mechelen-Brussels
- Metropolis: Mechelen-Brussels
- Diocese: Roman Catholic Diocese of Bruges
- See: Bruges
- Installed: 22 September 1864
- Term ended: 04 January 1894
- Predecessor: Joannes-Baptista Malou
- Successor: Petrus De Brabandere

Orders
- Ordination: 9 June 1838 by Bishop Franciscus Renatus Boussen
- Consecration: 18 October 1864 by Engelbert Cardinal Sterckx
- Rank: Bishop-Priest

Personal details
- Born: Jean Joseph Faict; 22 May 1813 Leffinge, Lys, First French Empire
- Died: 4 January 1894 (aged 80) Bruges, Belgium
- Denomination: Roman Catholic
- Residence: Bruges, Belgium
- Education: Bruges seminary
- Motto: In fide et caritate

Styles of Jan Jozef Faict
- Reference style: The Most Reverend
- Spoken style: Monsignor

Ordination history of Johan Joseph Faict
History
Priestly ordination
- Ordained by: Bishop François-René Boussen
Episcopal consecration
- Principal consecrator: Engelbert Cardinal Sterckx
- Co-consecrators: Gaspard-Joseph Labis, Nicolas-Joseph Dehesselle
Episcopal succession
Bishops consecrated by Johan Joseph Faict as principal consecrator
- Archbishop Paul François Marie Goethals, S.J.: February 24, 1878
- Pierre-Lambert Cardinal Goossens: June 24, 1883

Jean-Joseph Faict (22 May 1813 – 4 January 1894) was the 20th Bishop of Bruges.

== Life ==
=== Early years ===
Faict was born in the coastal village of Leffinge at the time when the whole of West Flanders was part of the French empire. His father was a brewer (Brouwerij De Croone). He studied at the Minor Seminary, Roeselare (philosophy) and then at the Major Seminary, Bruges (theology), before progressing to the Catholic University of Leuven.

He was ordained to the priesthood on 8 June 1838. In 1839 he took the position of professor of church history, moral theology and physics at the Major Seminary in Bruges, before taking over as head of the minor seminary in Roeselare in 1849.

=== The bishop ===
In February 1864 he was appointed Coadjutor bishop under Jean-Baptiste Malou who died the next month. Faict was consecrated Bishop of Bruges on 18 October 1864. He took as his motto the words "In fide et caritate" ("In faith and charity"). In 1869–70 he participated in the First Vatican Council before it was cut short by the Capture of Rome by the Italian army. Faict's term as bishop lasted three decades, during a period of social and political turbulence in many parts of western Europe including Belgium.

Within the church the pope issued the Papal encyclical Quanta Cura in 1864. In it, the pope set his face, and that of the church, against change. The church became uncompromisingly conservative during the lengthy pontificate of Pius IX, and Faict followed the papal guidelines during his own time as bishop.

In political terms the Liberal Party was in the ascendancy, which meant continuing pressure for further secularization of politics and society in the Belgian state, and removal of the church from quasi-civil functions. There were new laws on church property and cemeteries. Religious education in schools ceased to be compulsory. Within the church community this triggered a resurgence of ultramontane pressures which the bishops themselves tended to reflect. Bishop Faict was strident in his defence of church privileges, although his actions were frequently milder and more pragmatic than his rhetoric.

Where politics became more polarised, Faict sided with the Conferation of Catholic parties, becoming an influential supporter. He developed his own network of excellent political and press contacts. Within his own traditionally conservative diocese of Bruges many local councils turned in with Catholic majorities in 1876 local elections, something that was repeated at a national level in 1884.

Faict's period as bishop was one of strong growth for the church in his own region. He was able to ordain almost a thousand new priests during a term in office of slightly under thirty years. He personally prioritised the training of priests, and sent many on to pursue further study at Leuven/Louvain or Rome. He organised annual retreats for the priests serving under him, and always attended these himself.

Among the faithful he was a strong supporter of the establishment of devotional groups. He was a particular supporter of Marian-Christian spirituality. He supported organisations sponsoring youth activities. He was enthusiastic in his encouragement of processions, pilgrimages, popular missions and other activities likely to build popular Christian belief. Regarding the social problems he believed in the importance of charity. He was a great supporter of the Sint Vincent and Francis Xavier associations. From 1866 he encouraged the guilds of associations of Christian workers.

== Literature ==
- A. SIMON, Jean-Joseph Faict, in: Biographie nationale de Belgique, Tome XXX, 1958-1959, col. 373-375
- Ann VANSTEELANDT, Jan Jozef Faict, in: M. CLOET (red.), Het Bisdom Brugge, Brugge, 1985
