= Bernard Jungmann =

German theologian and ecclesiastical historian

Bernard Jungmann was a German Catholic dogmatic theologian and ecclesiastical historian.

== Biography ==
He was born at Münster in Westphalia on 1 March 1833; died at Leuven (Louvain), 12 January 1895. He belonged to an intensely Catholic family of Westphalia; like him, two of his brothers entered the Catholic clergy, one joining the Society of Jesus and the other becoming a missionary in the United States. After finishing his studies with brilliant success at the public schools of his native town, he entered the German College at Rome through the mediation of the bishop's secretary, afterwards Cardinal Melchers, and made his philosophical and theological studies in the Gregorian College. In 1854 he received the degree of Doctor of Philosophy; he was ordained priest in Rome on 8 June 1857, and two years later received the degree of Doctor of Theology.

He then returned to Germany, and worked for a short time as chaplain in the church of St. Adelgunde at Emmerich. Malou, bishop of Bruges, in Rome in 1854 when Jungmann made his public defence of the philosophical theses, called him in September, 1861, to the chair of philosophy in the Minor Seminary, Roeselare. Four years later (1865) he became professor of theology in the Major Seminary, Bruges. Even at Roeselare, while performing his duties as teacher, he began that literary activity, which was thenceforth ever associated with his professorial duties.

His appointment to the chair of ecclesiastical history at Leuven University, in succession to G. Henry Wouters, opened in 1871 a wider field for his great ability. A keen intellect with powers of clear exposition, joined to the spirited delivery which distinguished his lectures, ensured him great success. He enlarged the field of ecclesiastico-historical studies by delivering special lectures on patrology, and establishing in 1890 a seminary for ecclesiastical history, in which students were to receive a scientific and methodical training in original historical research.

Jungmann remained to the end of his life a professor at Leuven, declining the honour of a call to be professor of dogmatic theology in the newly founded Catholic University at Washington. He was seized with a fit of apoplexy at the burial of a colleague, and died at Leuven in 1895.

== Works ==
His activity as a writer was equal to his energy as a lecturer. As professor of philosophy he wrote "Demonstratio christiana. I. Demonstrationis christianæ præambula philosophica" (Roeselare, 1864; 2nd ed., 1867).

In the domain of theology he wrote his "Institutiones theologiæ dogmaticæ specialis" in five tracts, widely used and much appreciated for their clear style: "De Gratia" (Bruges, 1866; 5th ed., Ratisbon, 1882); "De Deo uno et trino" (Bruges, 1867; 4th ed., Ratisbon, 1882); "De Deo Creatore" (Bruges, 1868; 4th ed., Ratisbon, 1883); "De Verbo incarnato" (Bruges, 1869; 4th ed., Ratisbon, 1884); "De quattuor novissimis" (Ratisbon, 1871; 3rd ed., 1885). He wrote also the "Institutiones theologiæ dogmaticæ generalis" (Bruges, 1871; 4th ed., Ratisbon, 1886).

In church history he first re-edited Wouter's "Historiæ ecclesiasticæ compendium" (3 volumes, Louvain, 1879), and later published special studies, particularly on theological controversies and on the papacy: "Dissertationes selectæ in historiam ecclesiasticam" (5 volumes, Ratisbon, 1880).

In patrology, he issued Josef Fessler's Institutiones Patrologiæ in a new and much enlarged edition (2 volumes, Innsbruck, 1890, 1892, 1896).

He contributed numerous articles to German and French journals, particularly worthy of mention being: "Die neue französische Fortschrittsphilosophie" in the "Katholik" (Mainz, 1865); "Die hl. Märtyrer von Gorkum", ibid. (1867); "Clemens V. und die Aufhebung des Templerordens" in the Zeitschrift für katholische Theologie (Innsbruck, 1881); "Le caractère moral de Luther" in "La Controverse" (1883).
