= Minor Seminary, Roeselare =

Coordinates: 50°56′36″N 3°07′31″E

The Minor Seminary, Roeselare (Dutch: Klein Seminarie Roeselare; est. 1806) is a diocesan secondary school in Roeselare, West Flanders, Belgium. Initially primarily a preparatory institution for the Major Seminary, Bruges, it is now a substantial secondary school for the local community.

== History ==
The diocesan Minor Seminary opened on 27 May 1806 in buildings that between 1641 and 1797 had housed an Augustinian Latin school. The property had been established as a hospital in 1245 by Margaret of Constantinople, and transferred to the Augustinians in 1634-1635. The buildings were considerably modified over the course of subsequent centuries.

The school was closed by government decree between 1812 and 1814 (under Napoleon) and again from 1825 to 1830 (under William I of the Netherlands).

From 1838 to 1846 one wing was a normal school, that then moved to Torhout (now part of Hogeschool VIVES). It was replaced by the Institut Saint-Michel, a primary school and trade school, which from 1849 to 1884 also included a separate English section due to the number of students enrolling from England and Ireland, where Catholic secondary education was still underdeveloped. From 1849 to 1953, the Minor Seminary provided philosophy courses for those who had completed their secondary education and were beginning their training for the priesthood.

Through the influence of Guido Gezelle and the activism of Albrecht Rodenbach, the school became one of the intellectual centres of the 19th-century Flemish Movement.

The church attached to the school was built in the years 1725–1749. During the First World War the German occupying forces requisitioned the building as a field hospital. In 1918 there was extensive damage due to a fire caused by Allied shelling.

== Notable teachers and alumni ==
- Thomas Bouquillon
- Pol Demade
- Johan Joseph Faict
- Guido Gezelle
- Bernard Jungmann
- Constant Lievens
- Albrecht Rodenbach
- Victor Roelens
- Gustavus Waffelaert
