= François-René Boussen =

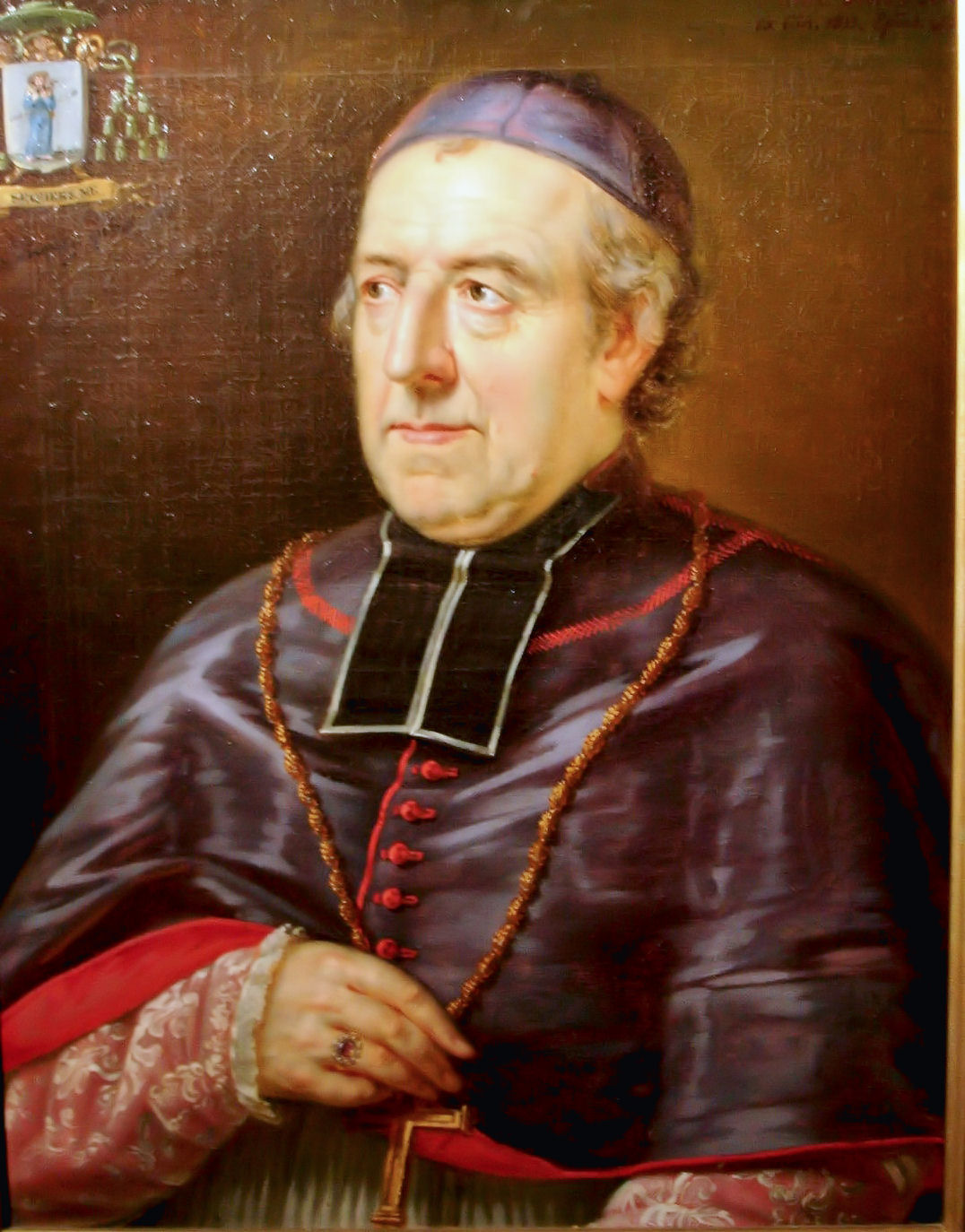
- Archdiocese: Mechelen
- Diocese: Bruges
- See: St. Salvator
- Installed: 23 July 1834
- Predecessor: (diocese suppressed 1797–1834)
- Successor: Joannes-Baptista Malou
- Previous post: Apostolic Administrator of West Flanders

Orders
- Ordination: 1805
- Consecration: 27 January 1833

Personal details
- Born: 2 December 1774 Veurne, County of Flanders, Austrian Netherlands
- Died: 1 October 1848 (aged 73) Bruges, West Flanders, Belgium
- Residence: Bruges, Belgium
- Motto: Sequere me ("Follow me", Jn 21:19)
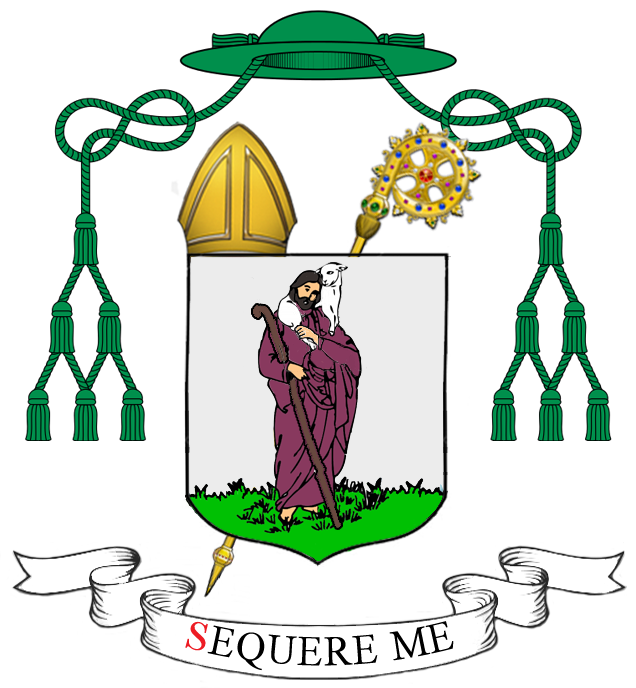
- Coat of arms

Franciscus Renatus Boussen or Frans Boussen(1774–1848) was the 18th bishop of Bruges, and the first after the re-establishment of the diocese in 1834.

== Life ==
Boussen was born in Veurne on 2 December 1774, the son of Laurentius Josephus Boussen and Joanna Theresia Vandermeersch. He studied at the Oratorian school in Veurne until it was closed in the French period, and completed his education with private tutors. After the Concordat of 1801 allowed the reopening of the seminaries, he trained for the priesthood and was ordained in 1805 as a priest for the diocese of Ghent. He was appointed secretary to Bishop Fallot de Beaumont, and continued in the function when Maurice-Jean de Broglie took over the diocese. In Broglie's prolonged absences due to persecution by the civil powers, the administration of the diocese fell to his Vicars General assisted by Boussen, who on 12 May 1821 were acquitted of wrong-doing by the courts in Brussels.

Jan Frans Van De Velde, bishop from 1829, appointed Boussen a canon of Ghent Cathedral and diocesan official. In 1833 he became coadjutor bishop of Ghent and apostolic administrator of West Flanders. He was consecrated titular bishop of Ptolemais in the church of St Salvator in Bruges on 27 January 1833 by Engelbert Sterckx, with Van de Velde and Jean Joseph Delplancq as co-consecrators. In 1834, the diocese of Bruges was re-established and Boussen was installed as bishop on 23 July. The city of Bruges gave the 17th-century buildings of the Abbey of Dunes to the diocese to establish a seminary. Boussen was responsible for securing funds, hiring staff, and appointing a cathedral chapter.

He abolished the surviving diocesan uses of Bruges, Tournai and Ypres, and in 1839 published a uniform Manuale pastorum, printed in Ghent by Van Ryckeghem-Hovaere. He was active in alleviating suffering during a series of epidemics and food shortages in the 1830s and 1840s. He fell ill during the Procession of the Holy Blood on 4 May 1846 and never fully recovered. He died on 1 October 1848 and was buried three days later in the crypt of Bruges Cathedral.

== Writings ==
- Collectio epistolarum pastoralium, instructionum et statutorum (5 volumes)
