= Callewaert =

Callewaert is a surname. Notable people with the surname include:

- Jan Callewaert (1956–2022), Belgian entrepreneur and football administrator
- Kamiel Callewaert (1866–1943), Belgian Catholic priest and historian
