= Jean-Baptiste Malou =

Belgian university professor and bishop

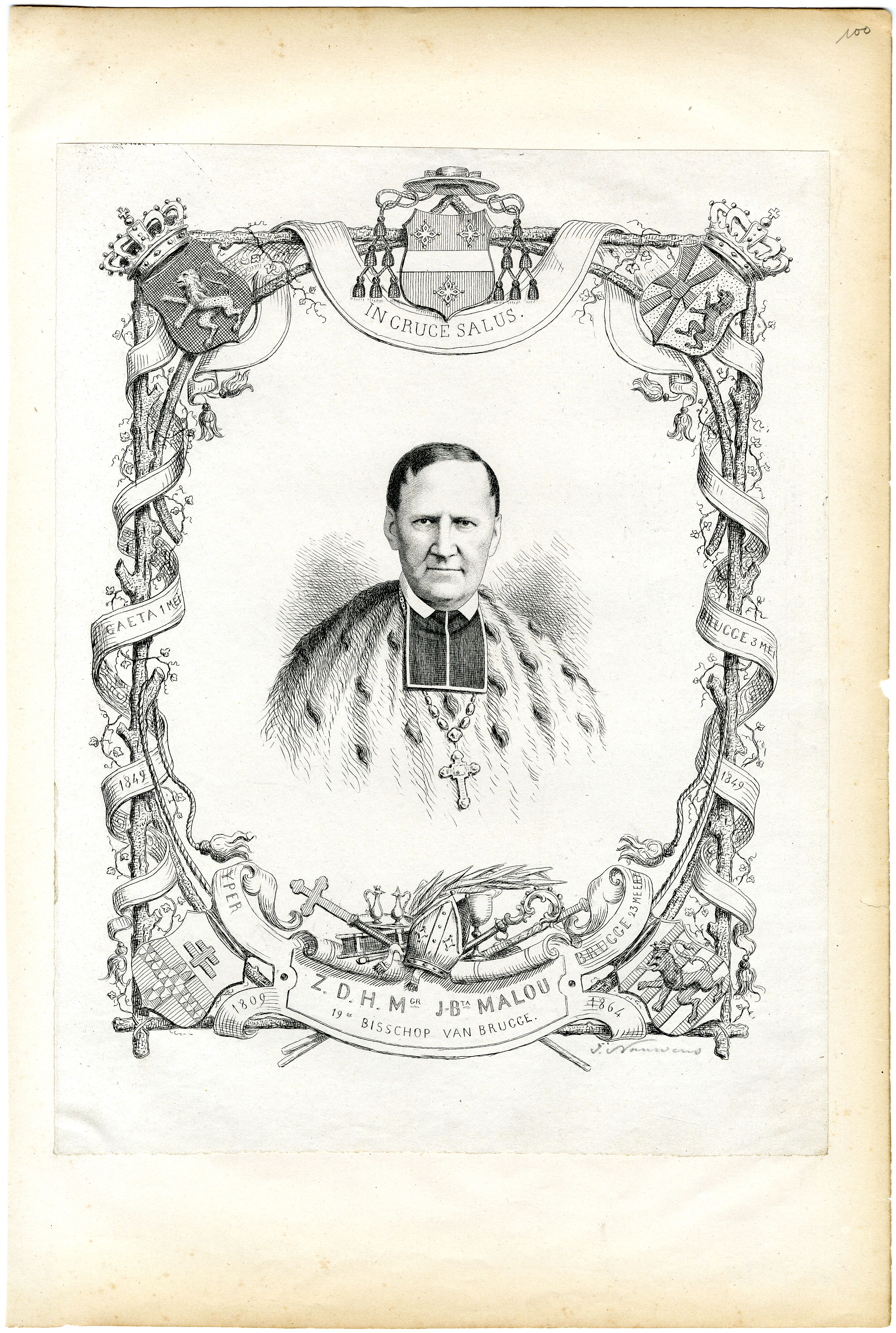
- Archdiocese: Mechelen
- Diocese: Bruges
- See: St. Salvator
- Predecessor: François-René Boussen
- Successor: Johan Joseph Faict
- Previous posts: Professor of Dogmatic Theology, Catholic University of Leuven

Orders
- Ordination: 2 November 1834
- Consecration: 1 May 1849

Personal details
- Born: 30 June 1809 Ypres, Lys, French Empire
- Died: 23 March 1864 (aged 54) Bruges, West Flanders, Belgium
- Residence: Bruges, Belgium
- Education: Collège de Saint-Acheul
- Alma mater: Pontifical Ecclesiastical Academy
- Motto: In cruce salus ("In the cross is salvation", Thomas à Kempis, The Imitation of Christ, book 2, ch. 12)

Joannes Baptista or Jean-Baptiste Malou (1809–1864) was a Belgian theologian who became bishop of Bruges.

== Life ==
Malou was born in Ypres on 30 June 1809, the son of Senator Jean-Baptiste Malou and Marie-Thérèse Vanden Peereboom. His older brother, Jules Malou, would be a prime minister of Belgium. He was educated at the Jesuit-run Collège de Saint-Acheul in France until 1828. During the Belgian Revolution he made a pilgrimage to Rome, where he determined to pursue a vocation to the priesthood and enrolled in theological studies at the Pontifical Ecclesiastical Academy and the Collegium Germanicum et Hungaricum.

Malou was ordained to the priesthood on 2 November 1834 and graduated Doctor of Sacred Theology in 1835, after which he returned to Belgium. He initially taught at the Major Seminary, Bruges, and from 1836 to 1848 was professor of dogmatic theology at the recently founded Catholic University of Leuven.

On 11 December 1848, he was preconised Bishop of Bruges, in succession to François-René Boussen, by Pope Pius IX. He was consecrated as bishop in Bruges on 1 May 1849, with the papal nuncio, Innocenzo Ferrieri, as well as Archbishop Sibour of Paris and Archbishop Wiseman of Westminster in attendance. As bishop his focus was on seminary education, the re-establishment of religious life, and the establishment of local schools run by religious orders. He also introduced Jean-Baptiste Bethune to the English artists' colony in Bruges, which led to Bethune opening his own stained glass works on the Hoogstraat.

In 1854, he was among the bishops consulted on the definition of the dogma of the Immaculate Conception. He died in Bruges on 23 March 1864.

== Publications ==
- Chronique du monastère d'Oudenbourg avec des notes et des éclaircissements (Bruges, 1840)
- Pieuse explication des prières du chrétien proposée à la jeunesse chrétienne (Leuven, 1841; second edition Tournai, 1854)
- La Lecture de la Sainte Bible en Langue Vulgaire (Leuven, 1846)
- Recherches historiques et critiques sur le véritable auteur de l'Imitation de Jésus-Christ (Brussels, 1848)
- Du Culte du Saint Sang de Jésus-Christ et de la relique de ce sang qui est conservée à Bruges (Bruges, 1851)
- Statuta dioecesis Brugensis (Bruges, 1852)
- De la Liberté de la charité en Belgique (Brussels, 1854)
- Iconographie de l'Immaculée Conception de la très sainte Vierge Marie, ou de la meilleure manière de représenter ce mystère (Brussels, 1856)
- La Fausseté du protestantisme démontrée (Brussels, 1857)
- L'Immaculée Conception de la bienheureuse Vierge Marie considérée comme dogme de foi (Brussels, 1857)
- De l'Administration des cimetières catholiques en Belgique (Brussels, 1860)
- Règles pour le choix d'un état de vie proposées à la jeunesse chrétienne (Brussels, 1860)
  - German translation Mainz, 1863
  - English translation by Aloysius del Vittorio, The Choice of a State of Life (London, 1874)
