= Cunerus Petri =

First bishop of Leeuwarden to take possession of the see

His Excellency Cunerus Petri
- Bishop of Leeuwarden
- Church: Roman Catholic
- Diocese: Leeuwarden
- See: Church of St. Vitus (incomplete)
- Appointed: 16 September 1569
- Term ended: 15 February 1580
- Predecessor: Remi Drieux
- Successor: Diocese suppressed

Orders
- Consecration: 13 November 1569 by Maximilian de Berghes

Personal details
- Born: c. 1531 Duivendijke
- Died: 15 February 1580 Cologne
- Education: University of Leuven

Cunerus Petri (c. 1531 – 15 February 1580) was the first bishop of Leeuwarden to take possession of the see. He was nominated in succession to Remi Drieux, who had been unable to do so before being translated to the position of bishop of Bruges.

== Life ==
Petri was born around 1531 in Duivendijke, near Brouwershaven in the County of Zeeland. He studied Philosophy and Theology at Leuven University, graduating with a doctorate in Theology on 12 November 1560.

He was appointed bishop of Leeuwarden on 16 September 1569, and was installed in 1570. On 26 February 1570 he published the decrees of the Council of Trent in his diocese, and on 15 April held a diocesan synod. In December 1576 the States of the Lordship of Friesland subscribed to the Pacification of Ghent. On 28 March 1578 Petri was imprisoned by the rebels in Harlingen. Upon his release, he sought refuge in Germany, dying in Cologne on 15 February 1580.

== Works ==
- Een seker bewijs vanden vaghevier (Leuven, Rutger Velpius, 1566). Available on Google Books.
- Tractaet vant hoochwaerdich sacrament des aultaers (Leuven, Rutger Velpius, 1567). Available on Google Books.
- De Christiani Principis Officio (Cologne, Maternus Cholinus, 1579) Available on Google Books.
