= Roman Catholic Diocese of Leeuwarden =

Former Dutch Roman Catholic diocese

The Roman Catholic Diocese of Leeuwarden was a short-lived (1559-1580) Roman Rite Dutch suffragan diocese in the ecclesiastical province of the Archbishopric of Utrecht.

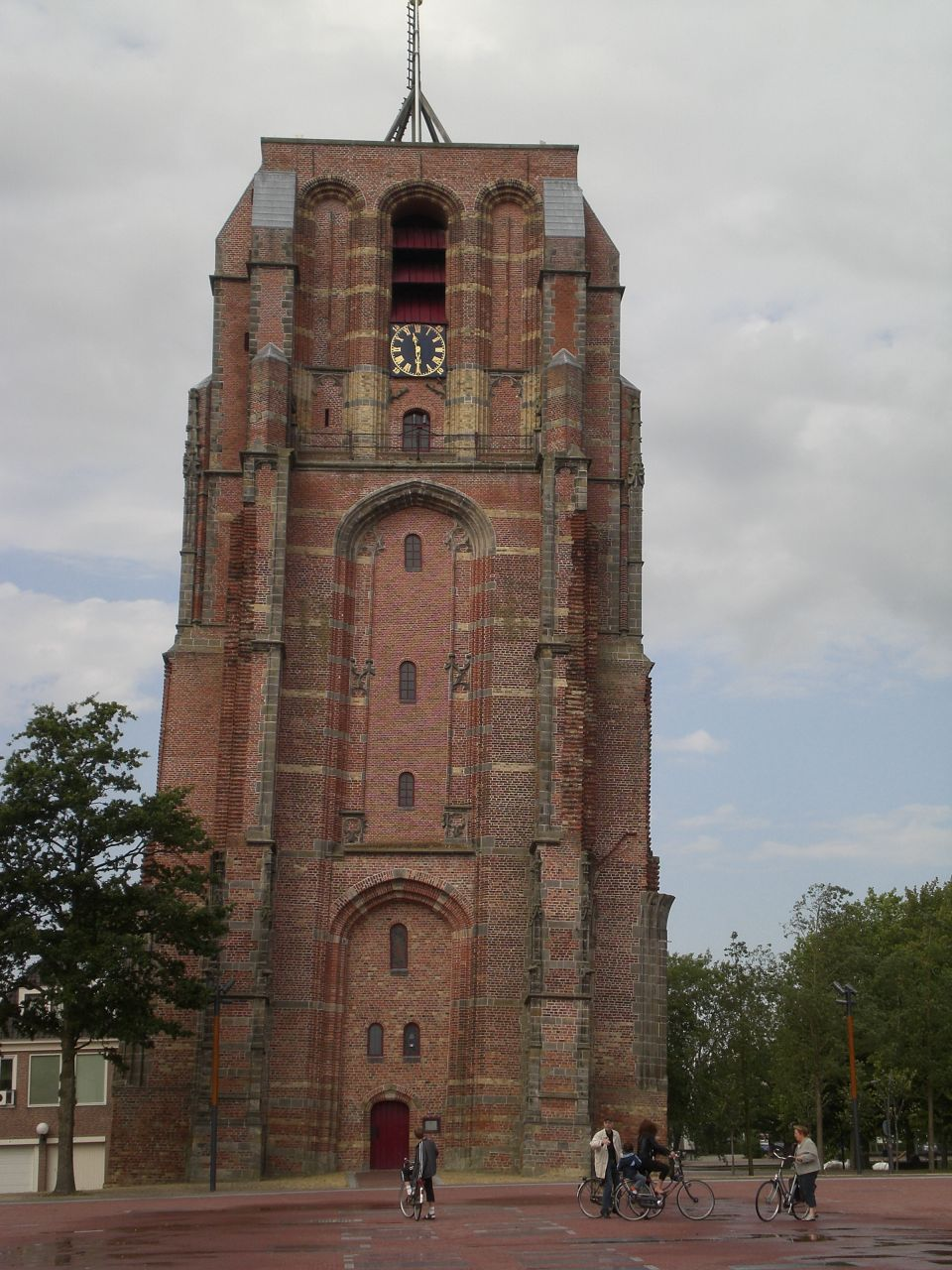
The tower of the former cathedral

== History ==
The Diocese of Leeuwarden was established in principle on 12 May 1559, canonically split from the then Diocese of Utrecht, which was simultaneously promoted to an Archdiocese and became Leeuwarden's Metropolitan. Its territory was defined by the papal bull Regimini universalis of 7 August 1561 as the territory of Friesland with the islands Terschelling and Ameland. The episcopal see was to be the Church of St. Vitus, formerly a parish church. Diocesan finances were derived from the income of the regular canons of Burgum and the Premonstratensian Pingjum Abbey near Bolsward, with the cathedral chapter financed from Mariengaard Abbey in Hallum.

The first bishop to be appointed, in 1561, was Remi Drieux (Remigius Driutius), who never took possession of his see. Despite this, in October 1565, Dreux did take part in the provincial council of Utrecht as bishop of Leeuwarden. In 1569 Drieux was appointed to the diocese of Bruges, and was succeeded in Leeuwarden by Cunerus Petri.

In 1578, during the Dutch Revolt, part of the Eighty Years War (when Catholic Habsburg lost the northern provinces), bishop Petri was captured by the rebel stadtholder (governor) of Friesland, George de Lalaing, Count of Rennenberg, and imprisoned in Harlingen. The bishop was to die in exile in Germany in 1580. In 1579 Rennenberg sequestered the revenues of the diocese, and transferred them to the States of Friesland. The diocese was legally suppressed, along with Catholic worship, in 1580. From 1592 the diocesan territory was ecclesiastically part of the Dutch Mission.

The diocesan title would reappear in 1969, when the Diocese of Groningen was refounded as Diocese of Groningen-Leeuwarden.

== Residential Bishops of the suffragan see ==
- Remi Drieux (15 March 1560 – 16 September 1569 nominal), later bishop of Bruges in Flanders (16 September 1569 – death 12 May 1594)
- Cunerus Petri (16 September 1569 – death 15 February 1580)

== See also ==
- List of Catholic dioceses in the Netherlands

== Sources and external links ==
- GCatholic
