= Petrus De Brabandere =

Belgian Catholic bishop

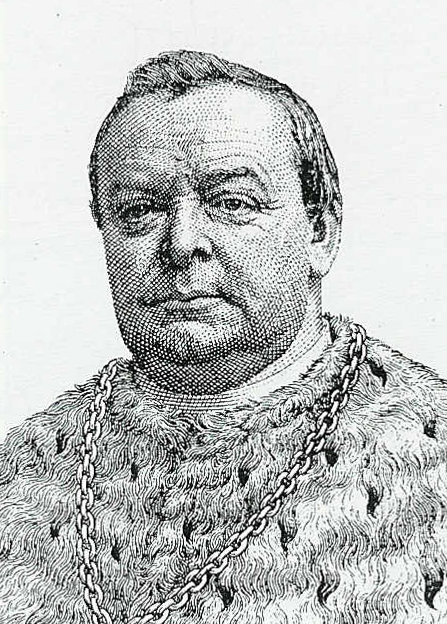
- Church: Catholic Church
- Diocese: Diocese of Bruges
- See: St. Salvator's
- Appointed: 18 May 1894
- Predecessor: Johan Joseph Faict
- Successor: Gustavus Waffelaert
- Previous post: Professor of Canon Law

Orders
- Ordination: 21 May 1853
- Consecration: 11 June 1894

Personal details
- Born: 21 September 1828 Ooigem, West Flanders, United Kingdom of the Netherlands
- Died: 31 March 1895 (aged 66) Bruges, West Flanders, Belgium
- Education: Catholic University of Leuven; Major Seminary, Bruges
- Motto: In Te Confido ("I trust in you", Psalm 25)

Pierre or Petrus De Brabandere (1828–1895) was the 21st bishop of Bruges in Belgium.

== Life ==
De Brabandere was born in Ooigem, West Flanders, on 25 September 1828. He enrolled at the Major Seminary, Bruges, on 1 October 1848 and was ordained to the priesthood on 21 May 1853. He went on to study at the Catholic University of Leuven, graduating licentiate of canon law in 1857, after which he spent a year at the Belgian Pontifical College in Rome.

After returning to Belgium he briefly served in parish ministry in Ypres before being appointed professor of canon law at the seminary in Bruges in 1861. He wrote a manual of canon law that was a standard text for decades. He became the director of the seminary in 1869, and vicar general to Bishop Faict in 1880. He became a canon of Bruges Cathedral in 1885, and vicar capitular after Bishop Faict's death in January 1894. He was appointed Faict's successor as bishop of Bruges on 18 May 1894 and was consecrated as bishop on 11 June 1894. He died in Bruges on 31 March 1895, having been bishop for less than a year.

== Publications ==
- Juris canonici et Juris canonico-civilis Compendium (Bruges, 1869), much reprinted to 1914.
