= Thomas Edward Bridgett =

19th-century English priest and missionary

Thomas Edward Bridgett (20 January 1829 – 17 February 1899) was an English Catholic priest, missionary preacher and historical writer.

== Life ==
He was the third son of Joseph Bridgett, a silk manufacturer of Colney Hatch, and his wife Mary (born Gregson). He was born at Derby on 20 January 1829. His parents were Baptists, and Bridgett was educated first at Mill Hill School and then at Nottingham; but in 1848 he was admitted to Tunbridge School, and on 20 March 1845 was baptised into the Church of England. He was in the sixth form at Tunbridge from 1845 to 1847, proceeding thence as Smythe exhibitioner to St. John's College, Cambridge, where he was admitted pensioner on 23 February 1847. He intended taking orders in the Anglican church, but in 1850 he refused to take the oath of supremacy necessary before graduation, and was received into the Roman Catholic Church by Father Stanton at the Brompton Oratory. He joined the Redemptorist Order, completing his novitiate at Saint-Trond in Belgium, and after a course of five years of theological study at Wittem, in The Netherlands; in 1856 he was ordained priest and returned to England. Mission work is the chief function of the order, and as a missionary Bridgett was very successful. In 1868, he founded the Confraternity of the Holy Family attached to the Redemptorist church at Limerick.

Bridgett, however, found time for a good deal of literary and historical work, and produced several books of value, dealing mainly with the history of the Reformation. His earliest work was The Ritual of the New Testament, 1873, 8vo. In, he published Our Lady's Dowry, which reached a third edition in 1890. His most extensive work was his History of the Holy Eucharist in Great Britain, 1881, 2 vols. 8vo. In 1888, he published a Life of Blessed John Fisher (2nd edit. 1890); in 1889 The True Story of the Catholic Hierarchy deposed by Queen Elizabeth, and in 1891 The Life and Writings of Sir Thomas More. He also edited the Sermons (1876) of Bishop Thomas Watson (1513–1584); Lyra Hieratica. Poems on the Priesthood, 1896; and wrote The Discipline of Drink; an historical inquiry into the principles and practice of the Catholic Church regarding the use, abuse, and disuse of alcoholic liquors, 1876, Historical Notes on Adare, Dublin, 1885, 8vo, and Sonnets and Epigrams on Sacred Subjects, London, 1898, 8vo.

He died of cancer at the monastery of St. Mary's, Clapham, on 17 February 1899, and was buried on the 21st in the churchyard at St Mary Magdalen Roman Catholic Church, Mortlake.

His youngest brother, Ronald, for many years consul at Buenos Ayres, died 16 February 1899.
