= Lucy Weguelin =

- Born: 27 October 1839; Brighton, England, U.K.
- Died: 1932 (aged 92–93); Bath, Somerset, England
- Other names: Lady Smith

Lucy Weguelin (Brighton, 27 October 1839 – Bath, 1932), more commonly known as Lady Smith, was an immigrant in the "English colony" in Bruges, Belgium. She was part of the inner circle around the famous Flemish poet Guido Gezelle. However, her questionable activities and scandalous behaviour in Bruges caused quite a stir and significantly contributed to the decision to transfer the poet to Courtrai. Weguelin was notorious for her deceitful nature, and her actions seriously tarnished the reputation of the well known poet.

== Early years ==
Lucy Weguelin was born in 1839 as the child of Reverend William Andrew Weguelin, Rector of South Stoke, West Sussex, (1807–1892) and Emma Hankey (Hackney, 1812 – London, 1864). She was baptised on 15 January 1840 at St Mark's Church, Kennington, London.

William Weguelin sought a divorce on the grounds of adultery through a private bill, Weguelin's Divorce Act 1839 2 & 3 Vict. c. 60 Pr.; he remarried shortly thereafter. In 1849, he had another son, John Reinhard Weguelin (1849–1927), who became known as a painter. In 1850, he joined the Oxford Movement and converted to Catholicism. Lucy was raised by the affluent Hankey family on her mother's side. Banker Thomson Hankey was her uncle and managed her family's assets. In 1863, out of necessity, she married Ernest Albin Smith (London, 1844 – Brisbane, 1930) and had five children with him: Spencer Francis (London, 1863), Cecile-Ernest (London), Edith-Cathare (London, 1869), Liliane (Bruges, 1872), and Mathilde (Bath, 1873). After her husband had to resign from his position at the postal service for health reasons, the family embarked on a nomadic journey that took them from city to city, leaving a trail of debt behind each time.

== Lady Smith in Bruges ==
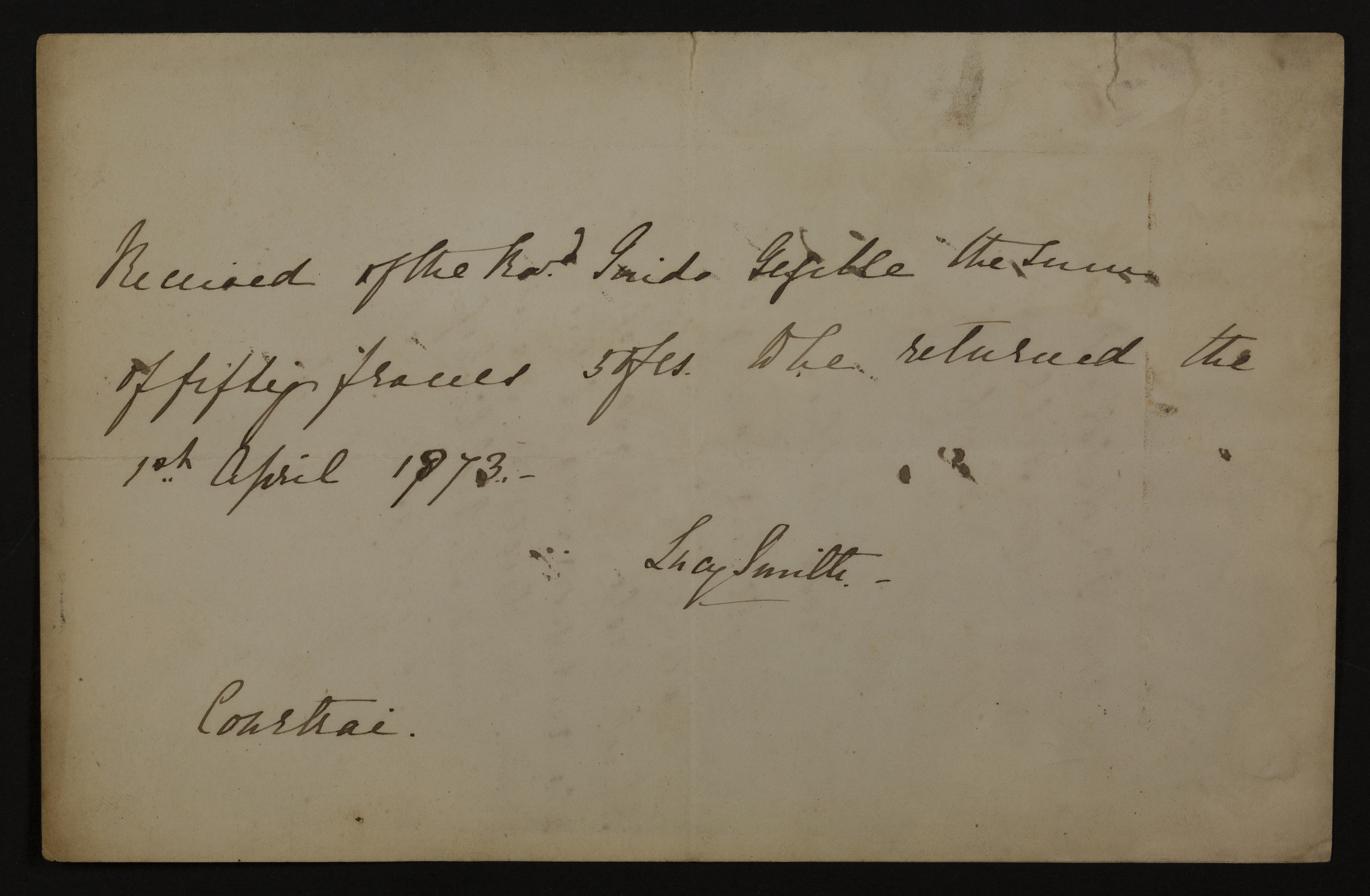
Receipt of Lucy Smith 50 francs to be returned 01/04/1873 (Guido Gezelle Archives, Public Library Bruges, Ref. No. Aanw. 652)

In early 1872, they arrived in Bruges (registered on 6 February 1872). They became neighbours of Guido Gezelle, who became their confidant. He became the godfather of their child Lilian and provided financial support as their debts accumulated again. Gezelle's reputation was compromised due to their behaviour and the gossip of Gezelle's maid, Stéphanie Hendryckx (Bruges, 1839 – ?). He even received a gift of a gold watch that was left unpaid. Rumours circulated that Weguelin gave birth to daughter Liliane in Gezelle's house. The poet's signature appeared as a witness on the birth certificate as well as on the death certificate of baby Liliane Smith. Bishop Faict forbade further contact with the Smiths and transferred the priest to Courtrai in September 1872. The incident was used by Gezelle's journalistic adversaries to discredit him. The Smiths' belongings were sold. They followed Gezelle to Courtrai a few months later, only to return to Bath at the end of 1873.

== Outcome ==
Ernest Smith departed for Australia in late 1874. Weguelin continued her nomadic life with Charles Bertram (Norwich, 1849). With him, she had two children: Charles Jr. (Ramsgate, 1877) and Hilda (Brighton, 1878). On 10 December 1880, they once again settled in Bruges from Liverpool. In early July 1881, they were evicted from their residence by the Bruges court due to unpaid rent. In 1891, Lucy Smith established herself in Scarborough under the alias Mrs. Brooke. After furnishing her house and living on credit for several months, she disappeared suddenly without repaying her outstanding debts. Census records indicate that Charles and Lucy Bertram were in Cornwall in 1901. They were accompanied by their son Charles Reginald and a maid. By 1911, they had relocated to Bournemouth. In the spring of 1932, Lucy Bertram, Lady Smith, died in Bath.

== Correspondence with Guido Gezelle ==
Weguelin and her husband Ernest Smith exchanged letters with the poet Guido Gezelle. He also possessed her poetry album. The original letters are kept in the Guido Gezelle Archives at the Public Library of Bruges.

== Lady Smith in literature ==
The scandalous aura surrounding Lady Smith became entangled with another set of rumours concerning foreign women in Bruges. This led to speculations about the conduct of priests in Bruges, which political adversaries and novelists were eager to exploit. They were believed to have influenced the character of Jane Scott in Georges Rodenbach's Bruges-la-Morte. Michel de Ghelderode also explored this theme in Fastes d’Enfer (1938). Weguelin is also a subject in the cartoons by Marec.

== Sources ==
- Plas, Michel van der. Mijnheer Gezelle: biografie van een priester-dichter (1830–1899). 4e dr. Tielt: Lannoo; Baarn, i.e. Amsterdam: Anthos, 1998. 622 p., [16] p. pl.
- Depuydt, Els. Guido Gezelle en Lady Smith: nieuwe vondsten en feiten. In: Biekorf: 119 (2019) 4, p. 385–403.
- Sint-Jan, R. van. Guido Gezelle's avonturen in de journalistiek. Tielt; Den Haag: Lannoo, 1954.
- Depuydt, Els De schandelijke Lady Smith
- Stefaan Vankerkckhove, Baanbrekend onderzoek naar intieme relatie Guido Gezelle, Krant van West-Vlaanderen (februari 2020) KW.be https://kw.be/nieuws/samenleving/baanbrekend-onderzoek-naar-intieme-relatie-guido-gezelle
