= Remi Drieux =

Bishop of Leeuwarden (1519–1594)

Remigius Driutius
- Bishop of Bruges
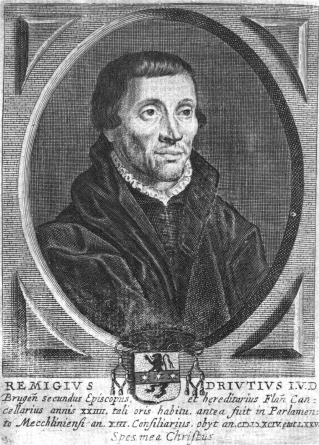
- Portrait of Remi Drieux
- Province: Mechelen
- Diocese: Bruges
- See: St. Donatian's Cathedral
- Predecessor: Petrus Curtius
- Successor: Mathias Lambrecht
- Other post: Bishop of Leeuwarden

Orders
- Consecration: 13 November 1569

Personal details
- Born: Remi Drieux; 1519 Volckerinckhove, County of Flanders, Habsburg Netherlands
- Died: 12 May 1594 (aged 74–75) Bruges, County of Flanders, Spanish Netherlands
- Denomination: Roman Catholic
- Parents: Remi Drieux and Catherine Fenaerts
- Education: Leuven University

Remi Drieux, Latinized Remigius Driutius (1519–1594) was the first bishop of Leeuwarden and the second bishop of Bruges.

== Early life and legal career ==
In 1519 Drieux was born in Volckerinckhove, County of Flanders (now in Nord-Pas-de-Calais, France), the son of Remi Drieux and Catherine Fenaerts. He studied civil law and canon law at Leuven University, graduating doctor of both laws and in 1544 becoming professor of civil law. In 1557 he was appointed to the Great Council of Mechelen, the highest law court in the Habsburg Netherlands.

== Episcopal career ==
In 1560 Drieux was named first bishop of the newly founded diocese of Leeuwarden, his appointment confirmed in 1561. He never took possession of his see, partly through the resistance of the States and clergy of Friesland, who regarded him as a foreigner. In 1569 he was translated to Bruges. The appointment received papal confirmation on 19 September, and on 13 November 1569 he received episcopal consecration in Mechelen from Maximilien de Berghes, archbishop of Cambrai, assisted by Cornelius Jansen and Franciscus Sonnius. He was installed as bishop on 4 December 1569, choosing the motto Spes mea Christus ("Christ is my hope").

During the early years of the Dutch Revolt, he opposed the rebels but urged negotiations. In the night of 28–29 October 1577, while in Ghent for a meeting of the States of Flanders, Drieux was placed under arrest together with several other leading opponents of the Dutch Revolt, including the bishop of Ypres, Martin Rythovius. In 1579 he attempted to escape from captivity but was recaptured. He was released on 14 August 1581, as part of a prisoner exchange, and spent time as a refugee in Tournai, Kortrijk, and Oudenaarde. In 1584 he was able to return to Bruges and resume his functions as bishop. He carried out numerous visitations of rural parishes, and reorganised the rural deaneries to ensure conformity with the decrees of the Council of Trent as implemented in his diocesan synods. He also established a minor seminary and promoted the founding of a Jesuit college in Bruges.

He died in Bruges on 12 May 1594 and was buried in the choir of St. Donatian's Cathedral.

Catholic Church titles
| Preceded by new creation | Bishop of Leeuwarden; 1561–1569 | Succeeded by Cunerus Petri |
| Preceded by Petrus Curtius | Bishop of Bruges; 1569–1594 | Succeeded by Mathias Lambrecht |
