= List of Catholic dioceses in the Kingdom of the Netherlands =

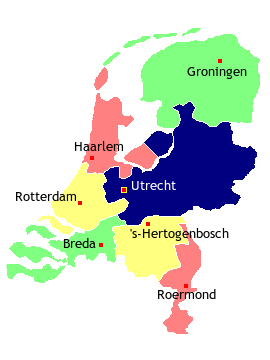
Map of the Roman Catholic dioceses of the Netherlands

The Catholic Church in the Kingdom of the Netherlands is organised into two ecclesiastical provinces: the Archdiocese of Utrecht for the Netherlands proper and Port of Spain for the Caribbean part of the Kingdom of the Netherlands. Similarly, there are two episcopal conferences in the Kingdom, that of the Netherlands proper and that of Antilles in the Caribbean part of the Kingdom.

== Ecclesiastical Province of the Netherlands ==
In the Netherlands proper, there are 6 suffragan dioceses of the Metropolitan Archdiocese of Utrecht.

- Metropolitan Archdiocese of Utrecht
  - Diocese of Breda
  - Diocese of Groningen-Leeuwarden
  - Diocese of Haarlem–Amsterdam
  - Diocese of Roermond
  - Diocese of Rotterdam
  - Diocese of 's-Hertogenbosch (Den Bosch)

=== Sui iuris jurisdictions ===
- Military Ordinariate of the Netherlands

== Ecclesiastical province of Port of Spain ==
In the Caribbean part of the Kingdom, the Church has a single diocese, the Diocese of Willemstad which is a suffragan of the Archdiocese of Port of Spain. Willemstad is part of the Antilles Episcopal Conference.

== Overlapping foreign competence ==
- Diocese of Saint-Vladimir-le-Grand de Paris for Eastern Catholics in France, Benelux etc.

== Former jurisdictions ==
=== Titular see ===
- Diocese of Maastricht

=== Other ===
(excludes suppressed precursors with see-identical successors)

- Apostolic Vicariate of Batavia (Holland) (first as independent mission; not to be confused with its East Indies counterpart on Java)
- Diocese of Deventer
- Diocese of Grave-Nijmegen
- Diocese of Haarlem
- Diocese of Leeuwarden
- Apostolic Vicariate of Limburg
- Diocese of Middelburg
- Apostolic Vicariate of Ravenstein-Megen

== External links and sources ==
- Catholic-Hierarchy entry.
- GCatholic.org - here current page.
