= Gaspard-Joseph Labis =

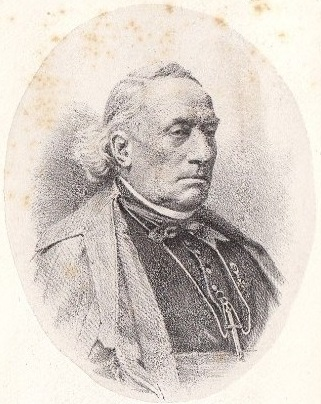
- Diocese: Diocese of Tournai
- See: Notre-Dame de Tournai
- Appointed: 1835
- Predecessor: Jean Joseph Delplancq (1829–1834)
- Successor: Edmond Dumont (1873–1880)
- Previous posts: Professor of Theology at the Grand Séminaire, Tournai

Orders
- Consecration: 10 May 1835

Personal details
- Born: 2 June 1792 Warcoing, Tournaisis, United States of Belgium
- Died: 16 November 1872 (aged 80) Tournai, Province of Hainaut, Kingdom of Belgium
- Buried: Tournai Cathedral
- Education: Collège de Tournai; Grand Séminaire, Tournai
- Motto: Fortiter et suaviter

Gaspard-Joseph Labis (1792–1872) was a 19th-century bishop of Tournai.

== Life ==
Labis was born in Warcoing on 2 June 1792, and educated in Tournai, first at the city's college and then at the major seminary. When the seminary was obliged to send its students home, he transferred to Arras to complete his training. He served in two parishes (Saint-Léger and Willaupuis) before becoming professor of dogmatic theology at the reopened seminary in Tournai.

At the Belgian Revolution of 1830, Labis was a supporter of constitutional liberty. He was appointed bishop of Tournai on 6 April 1835 only after subscribing to a declaration of adherence to the encyclical Mirari vos, due to suspicions that he was sympathetic to Lamennais, and was consecrated as bishop on 10 May. As bishop, he was active in expanding Catholic education in his diocese. He established the Bonne-Espérance normal school, run by the Brothers of Christian Schools, to train teachers (1839), and instituted episcopal patronage of the Collège Saint-Augustin, Enghien (1850) and Collège Saint-Éloi, Leuze (1860). He also encouraged the Sisters of Saint Andrew in the education of girls in Tournai. A proponent of the freedom of education, he lobbied against and was slow to implement government policies that he considered likely to undermine Catholic schools.

In 1854, as the longest-serving serving bishop in Belgium, Labis represented the Belgian bishops in Rome at the proclamation of the dogma of the Immaculate Conception. He also took part in the First Vatican Council (1869–1870), where he supported the definition of Papal Infallibility.

Labis was concerned about the growing immiseration of working people as industrial capitalism progressed in his diocese, and issue pastoral letters on the social question in 1844 and 1856. While supporting the existence of trade unions, he was inclined to see paternalistic and charitable support as the most suitable solutions to impoverishment.

Labis died in Tournai on 16 November 1872. His dying wish was to be buried in his cathedral, as was anciently the custom for bishops, despite the law on public cemeteries prohibiting burials inside churches. He was secretly inhumed in the cathedral, in a grave that was not rediscovered until 2014. Six of those involved were fined for their part in the illegal burial, but refused to reveal the whereabouts of the tomb.

== Honours ==
- Officer of the Order of Leopold, 19 July 1856.
