= Licht en Liefde =

Belgian disability non-profit

Blindenzorg Licht en Liefde is a Belgian non-profit organisation that aids the blind and the visually impaired in Flanders and Brussels.

== Foundation ==
At the start of the 20th century, Belgian individuals who were visually impaired were largely dependent on their families. Blind children received education in specialised schools, but initiatives for adults were few. The Maatschappij tot Onderstand der Blinden (K.M.B.S.) was the first Belgian organisation to offer financial support and vocational training to this group. It was located in Antwerp.

After the First World War, four different care associations for the blind were founded in Belgium within a timespan of five years. This was in part because of the large number of war veterans that were blinded during World War I. In 1919, La Lumière was established. 1922 saw the foundation of Ligue Braille and Oeuvre Nationale des Aveugles. Their Flemish counterpart, Blindenzorg Licht en Liefde, was created in 1923. The initiative was established by two priests who taught at a school for the blind in Spermalie, a small hamlet in Bruges. They were led by seminary president Kamiel Callewaert.

== Development (1923-1933) ==
The main goal of Licht en Liefde was to offer support and braille literature to alumni of the Spermalie school for the blind. Volunteers transcribed pre-existing books into braille. This initiative later became the first Flemish braille library. A secondary goal was to establish a federation for individuals with a visual impairment in Flanders and Brussels, named VeBes. Over time, Licht en Liefde became an association which provided education, jobs, and entertainment for the blind and the visually impaired. The organisation was financially supported by donations, and by sales of a blindenbloempje (blind flower). The staff consisted solely of volunteers.

== Consolidation and professionalisation (1933-2000) ==
From 1933 on, Licht en Liefde employed paid staff members. Regional service centers were set up in Flanders and Brussels. In 1938, Licht en Liefde built a residence for the blind and the visually impaired in Antwerp, which grew into an autonomous organisation named De Markgrave.

In 1948, Licht and Liefde employed social workers who offered assistance at home. From 1955 on, initiatives such as books with large print, spoken literature, and low-vision assistance came to be. Sint-Rafaël, a school offering vocational training for those who had become blind at an older age rather than being born with an impairment, was founded in 1959 in Ghent. In 1957, a holiday home was built in Brasschaat. It was moved to Varsenare in 1969, and was turned into a day center in 1979. The headquarters of Licht and Liefde were also moved to Varsenare. They originally were located at Jeruzalemstraat in Bruges.

== Literature for the blind ==
In 1964, Licht en Liefde was given the Visser Neerlandia award for their printed books for the blind. In 1981, the organisation procured an electronic braille printer, which was developed by KU Leuven. As time went by, the home computer became a revolutionary aid to the blind and the visually impaired. Therefore, Licht en Liefde took it upon itself to strive towards making the use of electronic equipment more accessible. This resolution has resulted in a project named BlindSurfer (2001), which was renamed AnySurfer in 2006.

The Vlaamse klank- en braillebibliotheek, owned by Licht en Liefde, was fused in 2008 with Vlaamse luister- en braillebibliotheek. The current name of the resulting braille- and audiobook library is Luisterpuntbibliotheek.

== Inclusion and networking (after 2000) ==
In the 21st century, the principle of inclusion became an established concept. This concept states that everyone should work towards making sure disabled individuals are able to fully partake in all aspects of society. Licht en Liefde strives towards this goal by employing volunteers, who are often blind or visually impaired themselves. Their input is an essential part of the expertise Licht en Liefde has built throughout the years.

Licht en Liefde has set up a network through which it collaborates with organisations such as VeBes, Huis 45, and Sint-Rafaël.

In 2008, a structural cooperation between Licht en Liefde and the Koninklijke Maatschappij voor Blinden en Slechtzienden (KMBS vzw) was established. This network included three new projects:

- Vlaams Oogfonds: offers financial support to initiatives that provide help to the blind and the visually impaired.
- Vlaamse Ooglijn: a voice over IP network and information exchange in which the internet is used to help the blind and the visually impaired.
- Vlaams Oogpunt: stimulates the collaboration of organisations and projects regarding the blind and the visually impaired that complement and strengthen each other.

== Sources ==
- "Blindenzorg Licht en Liefde". Blindenzorg Licht en Liefde.
- "AnySurfer". AnySurfer.
