= Charles Philippe de Rodoan =

- Bishop of Bruges
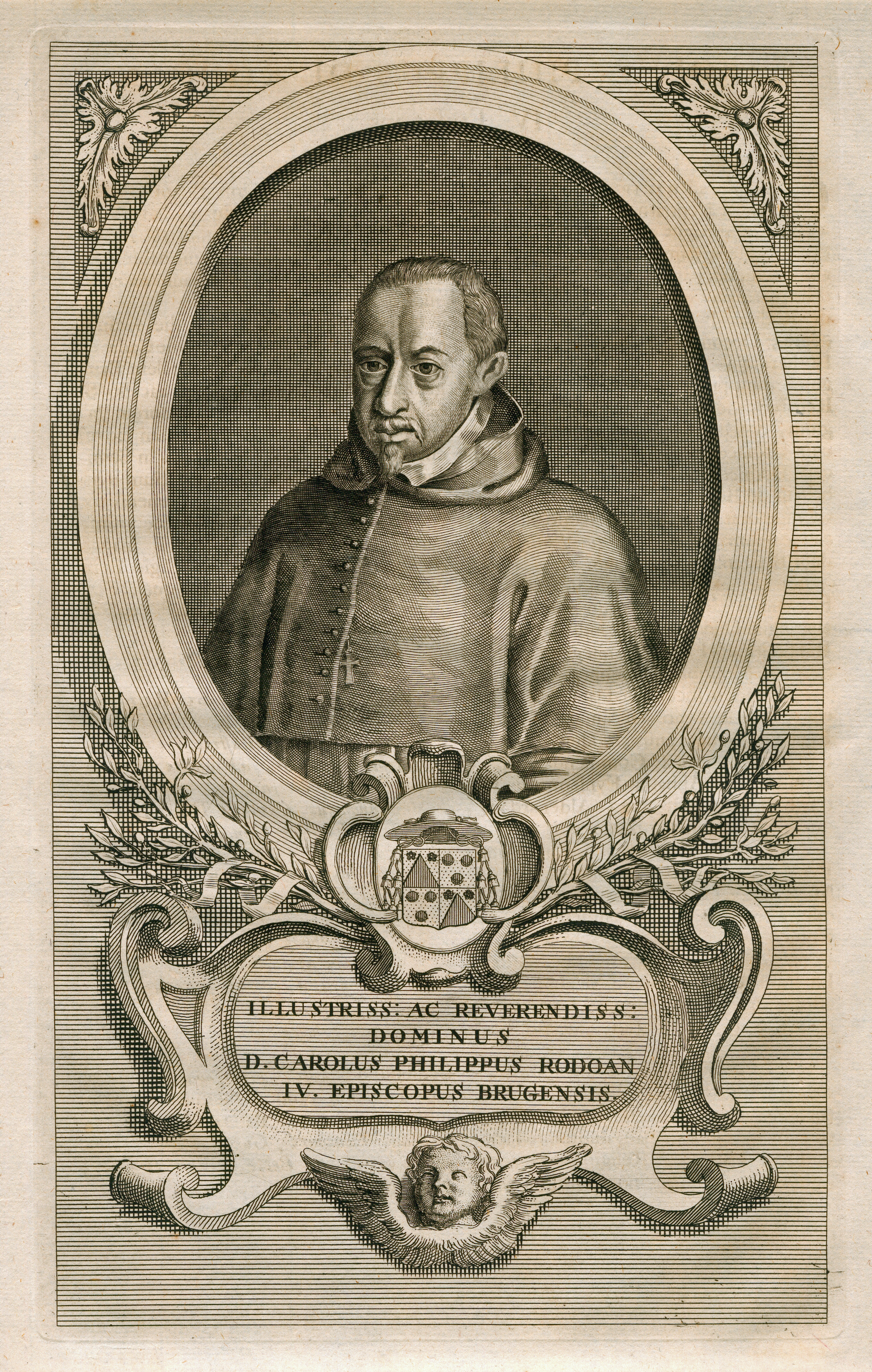
- An 18th-century engraving after a portrait of De Rodoan
- Province: Mechelen
- Diocese: Bruges
- See: St. Donatian's Cathedral
- Installed: 1604
- Term ended: 1616
- Predecessor: Mathias Lambrecht
- Successor: Anthonius Triest
- Other post: Bishop of Middelburg

Orders
- Consecration: 8 October 1600

Personal details
- Born: 1552 Beerlegem Castle
- Died: 7 July 1616 (aged 63–64) Ename Abbey
- Denomination: Roman Catholic
- Education: Leuven University

Charles Philippe de Rodoan, or in Dutch Karel Filips de Rodoan (1552–1616), was the third bishop of Middelburg and the fourth bishop of Bruges.

== Life ==
Charles Philippe was born in the castle of Beerlegem in 1552, son of Louis de Rodoan, knight, lord of Doncourt and Berleghem, master of the household of Anna of Lorraine. He studied at Leuven University, graduating Licentiate of Canon Law in 1574. Through the Lorraine connection he was provided with a canonry of Verdun Cathedral, but transferred to St Bavo's Cathedral, Ghent upon graduation. From 1578 to 1584, when the rebels ruled Ghent during the Dutch Revolt, he resided first in Verdun and later in Mons. In 1585 he became cantor or St Bavo's, and in 1590 dean.

In 1600 he was named bishop of Middelburg, and he was consecrated bishop by Mathias Hovius in Aalst on 8 October, but he was unable to take possession of the see because the city was in rebel hands. In 1602 he was proposed as bishop of Bruges, the nomination was confirmed by the pope in 1603, and he took possession of the see in 1604. With the beginning of the Twelve Years' Truce in 1609 he was able to visit the rural parishes, and take steps to reform the education of the young in the schools of his diocese. In 1611 he reopened the diocesan seminary, closed since 1578.

He died at Ename Abbey on 7 July 1616.

Catholic Church titles
Preceded by Johan van Strijen	Bishop of Middelburg; 1600–1603	Succeeded by see lost
Preceded by Mathias Lambrecht	Bishop of Bruges; 1604–1616	Succeeded by Anthonius Triest
