= Felix Brenart =

Felix Guillaume Antoine Brenart (1720–1794) was the last bishop of Bruges prior to the suppression of the diocese in the French period.

== Life ==
Brenart was born in Leuven on 23 November 1720, the son of Jean-Antoine Brenart, baron of Korbeek-Lo, who was professor of civil law in the University of Leuven. Felix himself graduated licentiate of both laws on 26 August 1744. After he had served as a canon of the chapter of St. Peter's Church, Leuven, on 16 January 1751 he was appointed dean of the chapter of St Gummarus Church in Lier and on 26 January 1758 ecclesiastical councillor on the Great Council of Mechelen.

On 21 February 1777 he was nominated to the see of Bruges. On 29 June of that year he was consecrated in Mechelen by Cardinal Franckenberg, with the bishops of Ghent and Ypres as co-consecrators. He made his solemn entry into his see on 3 August. For the occasion, the Capuchins of Bruges published a collection of congratulatory verses, acrostics and chronograms.

On 16 October 1786, Emperor Joseph II decreed government interventions in the life of the Church, closing diocesan seminaries and reforming civil and ecclesiastical administration. Brenart was a vigorous opponent of these changes, and welcomed the Brabant Revolution of 1790. During the Flanders campaign of the early French Revolutionary Wars he became a refugee first in Brabant, then in Guelders and finally in Westphalia. He died at Anholt, in Westphalia, on 26 October 1794, and was buried three days later in the crypt of the parish church there. He bequeathed the furniture of the episcopal palace in Bruges, and of his country house at Sint-Kruis outside Bruges, to the alleviation of poverty in the city of Bruges.

== Publications ==
- Traduction du mandement de Monseigneur l'évêque de Bruges, concernant la presse (Bruges, François van Eeck, 1790)
- Statuta pro alumnis Seminarii Brugensis (Bruges, 1791)
