= Victor-Auguste-Isidor Deschamps =

Belgian Catholic cardinal (1810–1883)

His Eminence Victor-Auguste-Isidore Dechamps
- Cardinal, Archbishop of Mechelen; Primate of Belgium
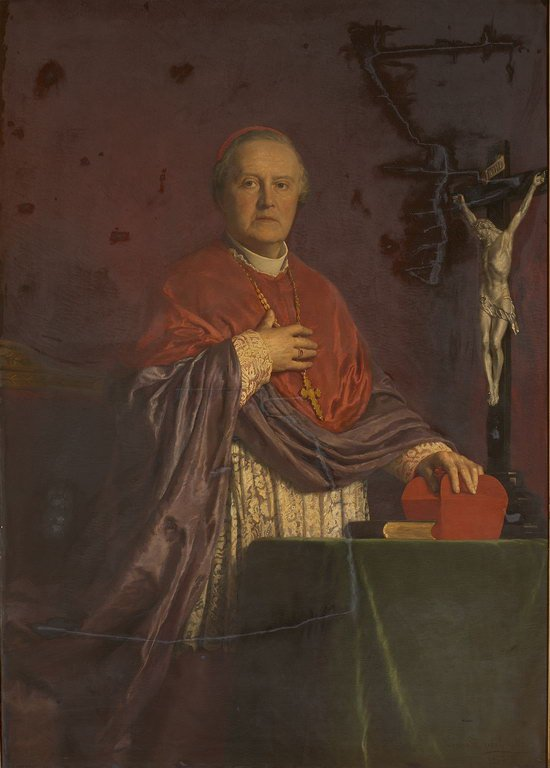
- Church: Roman Catholic
- Archdiocese: Mechelen
- Appointed: 20 December 1867
- In office: 1867–1883
- Predecessor: Engelbert Sterckx
- Successor: Pierre-Lambert Goossens
- Other post: Cardinal-Priest of San Bernardo alle Terme
- Previous post: Bishop of Namur (1865–1867)

Orders
- Ordination: 20 December 1834 by Engelbert Sterckx
- Consecration: 1 October 1865 by Karl-August von Reisach
- Created cardinal: 15 March 1875 by Pius IX
- Rank: Cardinal-Priest

Personal details
- Born: 6 December 1810 Melle, Belgium
- Died: 29 September 1883 (aged 72)
- Coat of arms

Victor Augustin Isidore Dechamps (6 December 1810, in Melle – 29 September 1883, in Mechelen) was a Belgian Archbishop of Mechelen, Cardinal and Primate of Belgium.

== Biography ==
He and his brothers made rapid progress in science under their father's direction. One, Adolphe Deschamps, entered on a political career. Victor pursued his ecclesiastical studies first at the seminary of Tournai and then in the Catholic University begun at Mechelen and afterwards transferred to Louvain.

Ordained priest 20 December 1834, he entered the Congregation of the Most Holy Redeemer in 1835, and made his vows 13 June 1836. The next four years he spent at Wittem as prefect of students and lector in dogmatic theology. In 1840 he began his missionary life and in 1842 was nominated rector at Liège. He took an active part in the founding of the Confraternity of the Holy Family, which he considered his most salutary work. In the historic jubilee of Liège he had a large share both by his "Le plus beau souvenir de l'histoire de Liège", and by his preaching (1845–46).

He visited England and saw the effects of the Tractarian movement. In 1849 he was nominated consultor general of his congregation, and took up his residence at Pagani near Naples just when Pope Pius IX was in exile at Gaeta. He had several audiences with the pope and was instrumental in arranging the transfer of the superior general from Pagani to Rome. This was not effected till 1855, when Pius IX invited Father Dechamps to the first general chapter held in Rome. The question of his appointment to the See of Liège was considered in 1852, but the pope, touched by his personal appeal, did not insist. In 1865 Dechamps became Bishop of Namur, whence he was transferred in 1875 to the Archdiocese of Mechelen and made primate.

He took an active part in the formation of the Pontifical Zouaves, and persuaded General Lamoricière to offer his services to Pius IX. He battled for Catholic schools and defended papal infallibility before and during the Vatican Council. Cardinal Manning and Dechamps were indefatigable; and they became cardinals in the same consistory, 15 March 1875. Cardinal Deschamps was appointed Cardinal-Priest of San Bernardo alle Terme. Dechamps worked to the very end. He said Mass on 28 September 1883, and died the day following in the arms of a Redemptorist who happened to be present. He was buried, as he had desired, by the side of Joseph Passerat at Rumillies (Tournai).

The complete works of Dechamps, revised by himself, were published in seventeen volumes at Mechelen. In presenting fourteen of the seventeen volumes to Pope Leo XIII on 7 February 1879, the author writes: "There is one thing that consoles me, Holy Father, in sending you my poor works: they are all consecrated to the truths of our holy Faith... . Volume I is consecrated to the truths of faith; II to Our Lord Jesus Christ; V to the Blessed Virgin Mary; III and IV to the Church and St. Peter; VI to the pope and his infallibility; VII, VIII, and IX to the refutation of modern errors; X, XI, XII, XIII, and XIV to my preaching as bishop and to acts by which I governed my diocese." Of the remaining volumes, XV, "Mélanges", deals with many important questions; XVI and XVII contain letters on questions in philosophy, theology, and other subjects.

Cardinal Dechamps's brother, Adolphe Deschamps, served as minister of public works from 16 April 1843 to 30 July 1845, and as minister of foreign affairs until 12 August 1847.

== Honours ==
- 1875: Grand Officier in the Order of Leopold.

Catholic Church titles
Preceded by Engelbert Sterckx	16th Archbishop of Mechelen; 1867-1883	Succeeded by Pierre-Lambert Goossens
