= AnySurfer =

AnySurfer is a Belgian organisation that promotes the accessibility of websites, apps, and digital documents for disabled individuals. It is also the name of a quality label which websites can obtain if they are fully accessible. AnySurfer is a national project run by Blindenzorg Licht en Liefde, a Belgian non-profit organisation that provides aid to the blind and the visually impaired.

The checklist AnySurfer uses when allocating the AnySurfer label is based on the Web Content Accessibility Guidelines (WCAG 2.0).

== History ==
BlindSurfer was founded in 2001 by Rudi Canters, a blind Internet pioneer. He was aided in his efforts by Blindenzorg Licht en Liefde. Thanks to financial support by Gelijke Kansen Vlaanderen, the project was consolidated in 2002. After Canters' death on 14 April 2003, the project and the renown of its label continued to grow.

On 1 July 2006, BlindSurfer changed its name to AnySurfer. This was done in order to avoid reinforcing the stereotype that web accessibility only benefits the visually impaired, rather than people with disabilities as a whole.

In December 2008, a second edition of the Web Content Accessibility Guidelines was published. AnySurfer took part in translating these updated guidelines into Dutch, and adapted their own checklist to conform to WCAG 2.0.

== Operations of AnySurfer ==
- Performs accessibility tests of websites based on pre-existing guidelines (the AnySurfer checklist and WCAG 2.0.). Websites that fulfil these criteria are granted the AnySurfer label.
- Organises trainings regarding the accessibility of webdesign, webcontent, and digital documents such as Word-files and PDF.
- Compiles a list of "Acknowledged Developers", which are web developers with a lot of knowledge and experience regarding accessibility.
- Collaborating with about ten different colleges, AnySurfer performs an accessibility monitor on a biennial basis. The results represent the progress that has been made in web accessibility among Belgian-based websites.
