= G. Henry Wouters =

Flemish church historian

G. Henry Wouters was a Flemish church historian who regarded ecclesiastical history as an auxiliary science to theology.

== Biography ==
He was born in Oostham in Belgian Limburg on 3 May 1802; died on 5 January 1872. In 1829 he became professor of moral theology, and later also of ecclesiastical history at the University of Liège.

At the reorganization of the University of Leuven in 1834 he became professor of ecclesiastical history to the faculty of theology, which post he filed until 1871. His successor at Leuven was Bernard Jungmann.

== Works ==
The first edition of his Historiae ecclesiasticae compendium appeared in three volumes (1842–43). In its time it had wide renown, and became a classical handbook in many countries.

It was supplemented by the Dissertationes in selecta historiae ecclesiasticae capita, four volumes (1868–72), which was to deal at greater length with controversial questions from the earliest times to the Council of Trent, but which stopped at the fourteenth century.

He drew his inspiration from Baronius, Antoine Pagi and Noel Alexandre.
