= Mathias Lambrecht =

Dutch bishop (1539–1602)

- Bishop of Bruges
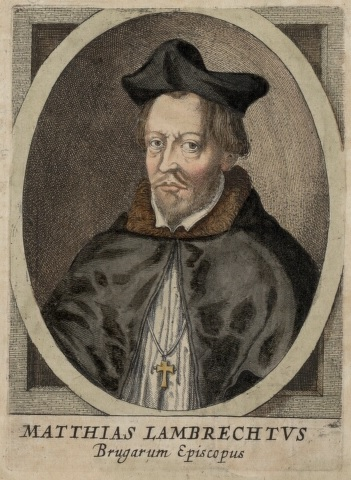
- Engraved portrait of Lambrecht from Antonius Sanderus, Flandria Illustrata (1641)
- Province: Mechelen
- Diocese: Bruges
- See: St. Donatian's Cathedral
- Installed: 15 August 1596
- Predecessor: Remi Drieux
- Successor: Charles Philippe de Rodoan

Orders
- Consecration: 28 July 1596

Personal details
- Born: 1539 Sint-Laureins, County of Flanders, Habsburg Netherlands
- Died: 1 June 1602 (aged 62–63) Bruges, County of Flanders, Spanish Netherlands
- Buried: St. Donatian's Cathedral
- Denomination: Roman Catholic
- Education: Leuven University

Mathias Lambrecht (1539–1602) was the third bishop of Bruges.

== Life ==
Lambrecht was born at Sint-Laureins in the Brugse Vrije around 1539. On 7 January 1569 he graduated Licentiate of Sacred Theology at Leuven University. Thereafter he taught theology at Park Abbey and was appointed a canon of Bruges cathedral, where he became penitentiary in 1571 and archdeacon in 1588, as well as rural dean of the deanery of Damme.

During the disturbances of the Dutch Revolt he took refuge in Walloon Flanders, first at Douai and later at Saint-Omer. He returned to Bruges after the city returned to Habsburg rule in 1584.

After the death of Remi Drieux, the second bishop of Bruges, Lambrecht was appointed his successor. He was consecrated bishop in Leuven on 28 July 1596 by Mathias Hovius, archbishop of Mechelen, and was installed in Bruges on 15 August 1596. He died on 1 June 1602, and was buried in the choir of his cathedral.

== Writings ==
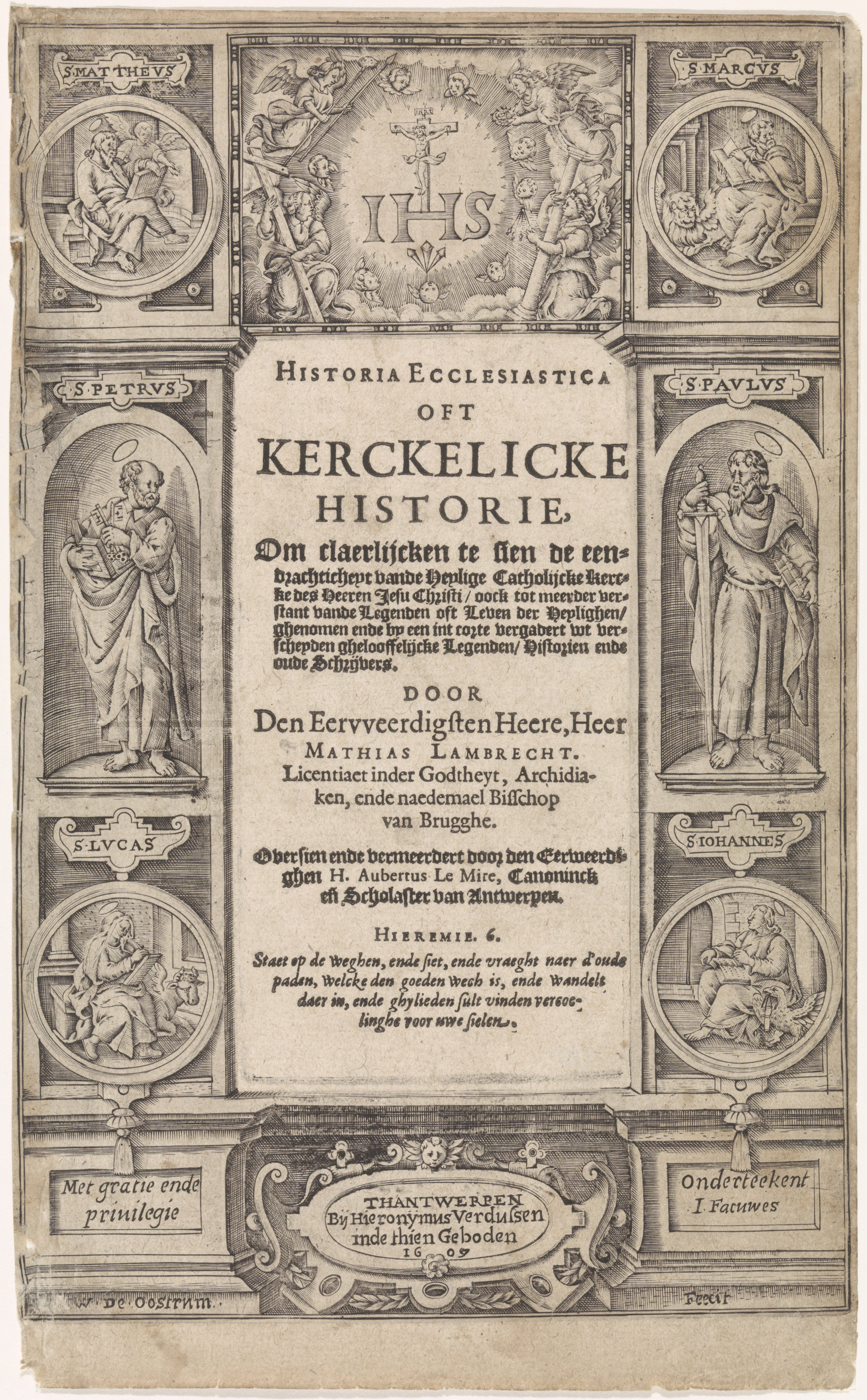
Mathias Lambrecht, Historia Ecclesiastica. Antwerp: H. Verdussen, 1609.

Drafts of his letters to cardinals Borghese, Mattei and Baronius, written on 15 February 1602, were published in 1941. His books include:

- D'leven, doot, ende lijden der Heyligen (2 vols., Leuven, Jan Bogaert, 1590)
- Historia Ecclesiastica. Oft een kerckelijcke historie (Antwerp, Hieronymus Verdussen, 1595); dedicated to the city government of Bruges.
  - A revised edition with a continuation by Aubert Miraeus was published in 1609.
- Un traité de l'Antéchrist (1602)

Catholic Church titles
Preceded by Remi Drieux	Bishop of Bruges; 1596–1602	Succeeded by Charles Philippe de Rodoan
