= Pierre-Lambert Goossens =

Catholic cardinal from Belgium (1827–1906)

His Eminence Pierre-Lambert Goossens
- Cardinal, Archbishop of Mechelen; Primate of Belgium
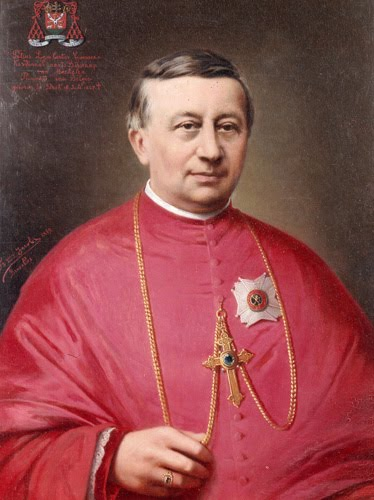
- Church: Roman Catholic
- Archdiocese: Mechelen
- Appointed: 24 March 1884
- In office: 1884–1906
- Predecessor: Victor-Auguste-Isidor Deschamps
- Successor: Désiré-Joseph Mercier
- Other post: Cardinal-Priest of Santa Croce in Gerusalemme
- Previous post: Bishop of Namur (1883–1884)

Orders
- Ordination: 21 December 1850 by Engelbert Sterckx
- Consecration: 24 June 1883 by Jean-Joseph Faict
- Created cardinal: 24 May 1889 by Leo XIII
- Rank: Cardinal-Priest

Personal details
- Born: 18 July 1827 Perk, Steenokkerzeel, Belgium
- Died: 25 January 1906 (aged 78) Mechelen, Belgium
- Buried: Perk, Steenokkerzeel
- Coat of arms

Styles of Pierre-Lambert Goossens
- Reference style: His Eminence
- Spoken style: Your Eminence
- Religious style: Cardinal
- Posthumous style: not applicable
- Informal style: Cardinal
- See: Archdiocese of Mechelen-Brussels

Pierre-Lambert Goossens (18 July 1827 – 25 January 1906) was a Belgian Catholic prelate who served as Archbishop of Mechelen from 1884 until his death. He was elevated to the cardinalate in 1889.

== Biography ==
Pierre-Lambert Goossens was born in Perk, near Vilvoorde, and ordained to the priesthood on 21 December 1850. He then taught pedagogy at the seminary in Mechelen until 1858, also being named vice-pastor of its cathedral and private secretary to the Archbishop in 1856. After becoming an honorary canon in 1860, Goossens was made vicar general in 1878, and later a Domestic Prelate of His Holiness on 20 August 1880.

On 1 June 1883, Goossens was appointed Coadjutor Bishop of Namur and Titular Bishop of Abdera. He received his episcopal consecration on the following 24 June from Bishop Jean-Joseph Faict, with Bishops Victor Joseph Doutreloux and Victor van den Branden de Reeth serving as co-consecrators. Goossens succeeded Victor-Auguste-Isidore Dechamps as Bishop of Namur on 16 July 1883, and was later named Archbishop of Mechelen and thus Primate of the Belgian Church on 24 March 1884.

Pope Leo XIII created him Cardinal-Priest of Santa Croce in Gerusalemme in the consistory of 24 May 1889. Goossens was one of the cardinal electors in the 1903 papal conclave that selected Pope Pius X.

In 1895 he ordained Amadeus de Bie as Abbot of Bornem Abbey. He died in Mechelen, at age 78, and is buried in his native Perk.

== Honours ==
- 1885: Commander in the Order of Leopold.
- 1900: Grand Cordon in the Order of Leopold.

== See also ==
- Archbishopric of Mechelen-Brussels

Catholic Church titles
Preceded by Victor-Auguste-Isidore Dechamps	Bishop of Namur; 1883–1884	Succeeded by Edouard Joseph Belin
Preceded by Victor-Auguste-Isidore Dechamps	17th Archbishop of Mechelen; 1884–1906	Succeeded by Désiré-Joseph Mercier
