= Guido Gezelle =

Belgian writer, poet and Roman Catholic priest (1830–1899)

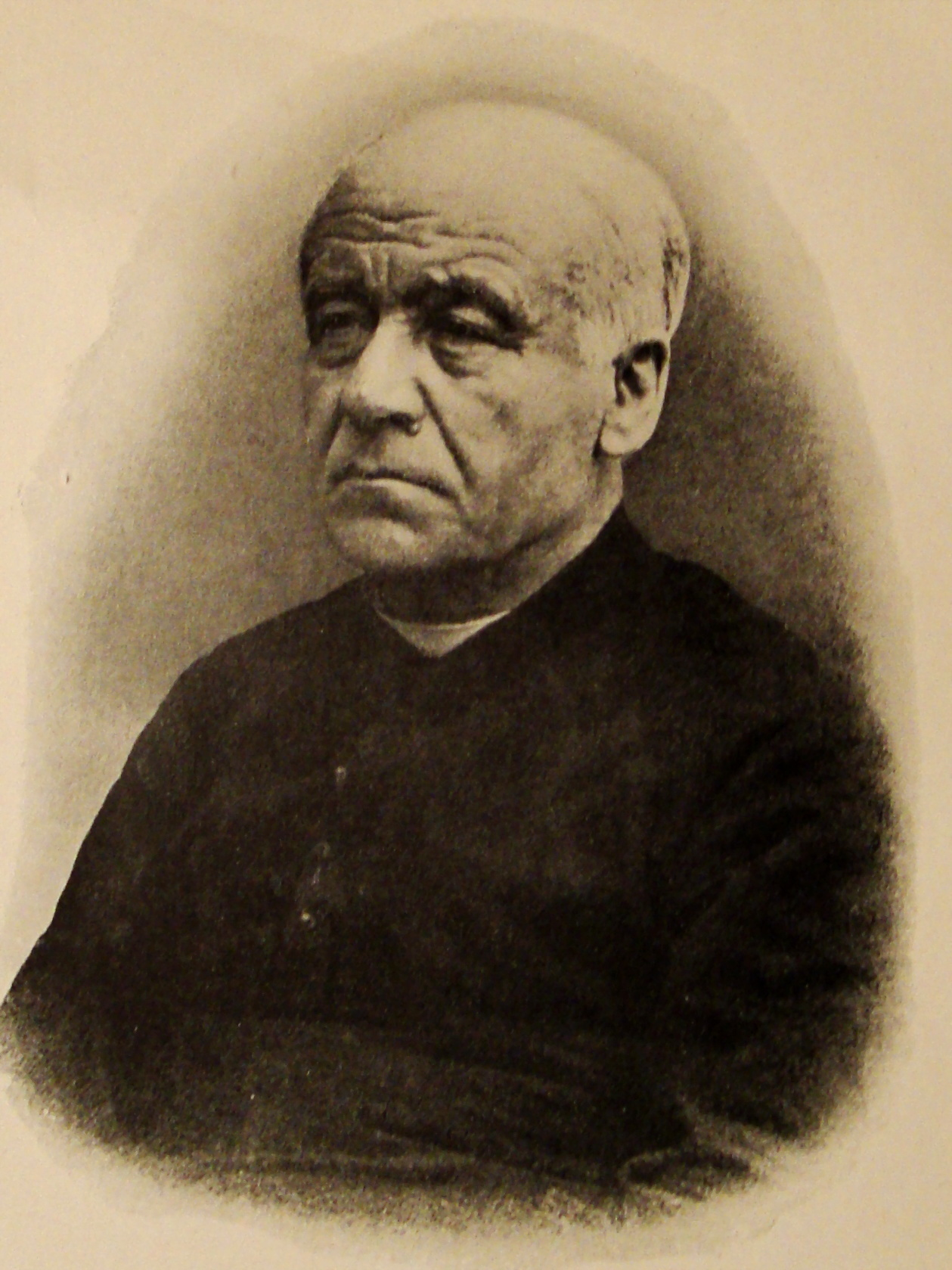
- Guido Gezelle
- Born: 1 May 1830; Bruges, United Kingdom of the Netherlands
- Died: 27 November 1899 (aged 69); Bruges, Belgium
- Occupations: Poet, priest, writer

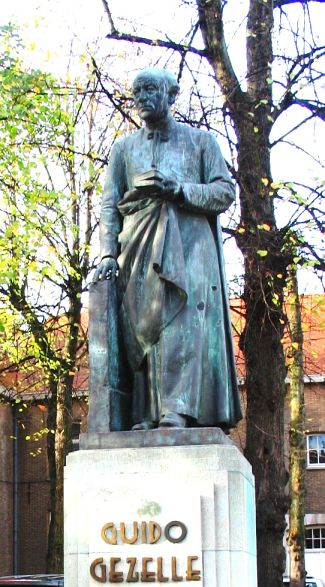
statue of Gezelle in Bruges, Jules Lagae, sculptor

Guido Pieter Theodorus Josephus Gezelle (1 May 1830 – 27 November 1899) was an influential writer and poet and a Roman Catholic priest from Belgium. He is famous for the use of the West Flemish dialect, but he also wrote in other languages like Dutch, English, French, German, Latin and Greek.

== Life ==
Gezelle was born on 1 May 1830 in Bruges in the province of West Flanders to Monica Devrieze and Pieter Jan Gezelle, a gardener. The house where he was born is now literary museum Gezellehuis.

Gezelle was ordained a priest in 1854, and worked as a teacher at the Minor Seminary, Roeselare. Interested in all things English and became the chaplain to the English Convent, Bruges, where he died.

His works are often inspired by his mystic love towards God and Creation. Later, his poetry was associated with literary Impressionism, and he is considered a forerunner of that movement.

Gezelle was a proponent of developing the Flemish dialects independently from (now) mainstream Dutch, with its dominantly Hollandic character. The Dutch he used in his poems was heavily influenced by local West Flemish dialect. Gezelle also was a translator of poetry and prose, notably of Henry Wadsworth Longfellow's Song of Hiawatha, published in 1886. Having read the original in Roeselare in 1856 the poem interested him for its portrayal of American Indians and their relation to Christian missionaries.

For his linguistic mastery, Gezelle is considered one of the most important poets of Dutch literature.

The Flemish writer Stijn Streuvels (Frank Lateur) was his nephew.

He died on 27 November 1899.

== Bibliography ==
- Kerkhofblommen (1858)
- Vlaemsche Dichtoefeningen (1858)
- Kleengedichtjes (1860)
- Gedichten, Gezangen en Gebeden (1862)
- Longfellows Song of Hiawatha (translation, 1886)
- Tijdkrans (1893)
- Rijmsnoer (1897)
- Laatste Verzen (1901)

== See also ==
- Flemish literature
- Lucy Weguelin
