= Archconfraternity of the Holy Family =

The Archconfraternity of the Holy Family is a Roman Catholic archconfraternity, founded in 1844 in Belgium.

== Foundation ==
This archconfraternity owes its origin to Henri Belletable, an officer in the Engineers' Corps, Liege, Belgium. He resolved to establish a society, which he would divide into companies of twelve in military fashion. The first reunion was held on the evening of Whit-Monday, 1844, in the room of a carpenter. When their numbers outgrew the room, the Redemptorists placed an oratory at their disposal, and Father Victor-Auguste-Isidor Deschamps, rector at Liège, took up the work.

He brought it to the notice of Bishop von Bommel, who gave it his formal approval on 13 February 1845, erected it into a confraternity with the title of Holy Family, 7 April following, and remained its lifelong promoter. Its purpose was to honor the Holy Family of Nazareth, and to encourage each other in the practice of Christian virtues. The statutes then drawn up were later presented to Pope Pius IX, who approved them by Briefs dated 20 and 23 April 1847, raised the society to the rank of an archconfraternity, enriched it with indulgences, and made the rector of the Redemptorists' Church of Our Lady of the Immaculate Conception, Liege, its director.

The development spread from Belgium to the Netherlands, and finally throughout the Catholic Church. The Archconfraternity was a particular apostolate of the Redemptorists. It was established in 1861 at the parish of the Church of the Most Holy Redeemer in Manhattan; there was also an active confraternity at St. Alphonsus Liguori Church in St. Louis.

An Archconfraternity for men was founded in Limerick in 1868, where street processions were an important feature of the Archconfraternity until the late 1930s.

Pope Leo XIII, when he established his own association of the Holy Family and suppressed all other associations of the same title, wished this archconfraternity to continue its work.
