= Zeitschrift für katholische Theologie =

- Discipline: Roman Catholic theology
- Language: German
- Edited by: Boris Repschinski

Publication details
- History: 1877-present
- Publisher: Faculty of Theology at the University of Innsbruck (Austria)
- Frequency: Quarterly

Standard abbreviations
- ISO 4: Z. Kathol. Theol.

Indexing
- ISSN: 0044-2895
- LCCN: sf81001125
- JSTOR: 00442895
- OCLC no.: 1774234

Links
- Journal homepage; Online table of contents; Online archive

The Zeitschrift für katholische Theologie was a quarterly peer-reviewed academic journal established in 1877 at the Faculty of Theology at the University of Innsbruck. It was associated with the Society of Jesus. The journal published its last independent issue in 2020. With the beginning of 2021 the journal merged with the journal Theologie und Philosophie to form the Zeitschrift für Theologie und Philosophie.

The journal aims to promote ecumenical discussion in the spirit of the Second Vatican Council. It is accessible through JSTOR and abstracted and indexed in the ATLA Religion Database and Scopus.
