= Sisters of Saint Andrew =

Female religious congregation of the Catholic Church

- Abbreviation: RSA (Religieuses de Saint-André)
- Formation: 1231, or 1857
- Founders: Two unnamed women
- Founded at: Tournai, Belgium
- Type: Apostolic Institute for women
- Headquarters: Generalate; Tournai, Belgium
- Region served: Worldwide
- Members: 146
- Patron saints: Saint Andrew
- Ministry: Education, retreats, spiritual accompaniment
- Parent organization: Catholic Church
- Website: saint-andre.be/en/

Generalate convent of the Sisters of Saint-Andrew, in Ramegnies-Chin, near Tournai (Belgium)

The Sisters of Saint Andrew [RSA], are a Catholic religious congregation of women whose origins dated back to the 13th Century. Founded in Tournai, Belgium, by two sisters who sold off their property and possessions in order to open a hospice for pilgrims and travellers, they received their first formal recognition by Pope Innocent IV in 1249. Obliged to become a monastic order by the conciliar changes wrought by the Council of Trent, the congregation adopted its current charism and constitutions based on Ignatian spirituality in the 19th century.

In 2011, there was 146 Sisters of Saint Andrew across fifteen communities, in Belgium, France, Brazil, Democratic Republic of Congo, and the United Kingdom.

== History ==
=== Origins ===
In 1231, a hospice for pilgrims was opened on the banks of the Scheldt river, opposite the parochial church of Saint Nicholas, in a place external to the walls of the town of Tournai, Belgium. It is founded by two sisters (whose names are unknown) who sold their property to put the proceeds at the disposal of poor travellers and pilgrims.

By a papal bull issued on 28 October 1249, Pope Innocent IV extended his protection to the hospice and its inhabitants, and according them certain religious privileges. The language of the bull indicates there is already a religious community living there. The mixed gender fraternity follows the rule of Saint Augustine and is under the authority of the Bishop of Tournai.

Although the names of the two founding sisters have been lost, history recorded the name of Brother Pierre de Quartes, director of the hospice in 1255. Food and shelter were offered free to the poor who presented themselves: they would spend the night there before crossing the c river and moving on into Tournai.

=== From hospital to hospital ===
The hospice of Saint Nicholas de Bruille moved into the town of Torunai and became a hospital at the beginning of the fourteenth century. Their principal activity was caring for the sick, although they continued to provide hospitality to the poor traveller. All care was provided free of charge and supported by public donations. In addition to the large central chapel, the hospital has a smaller chapel specifically for the use of the religious community living there. This is named for Saint Andrew, from which the later religion congregation derived its name. There are no more than six sisters: "so as not to eat the bread of the poor". The names of three sisters from this period have been recorded: Prioress Peronne de e Mot (c.1381), Marie Flokette (c.1331) and Jeanne Gargate (c.1392).

Significant flooding by the Schedlt river in 1402 cause considerable damage to the hospital. This was rebuilt twice the size, and named after Saint Andrew. At the same time, Superior Marie de Corbehen obtained a dispensation from Jean de Bourgogne, Bishop of Cambrai to lift restrictions on the number of sisters. The congregation immediately tripled in size. The rules, statutes and customs of the hospital and expanding religious community were revised and approved in 1460.

The sixteenth century was eventful, with the hospital along with the entire district being occupied by the troops of Henry VIII of England from 1513 to 1517. Prioress Jeanna de Galand (1488-1529) presided over the community during this time. Following the sieges of Tournai, Galand's successor Catherine d'Espierre (1529-1563), restored the premises and hired a Catholic chaplain from England who had been persecuted during the Reformation.

The chapel survived the iconoclastic crisis in the Seventeen Provinces in 1566, but the plague of 1572 decimated the sisters, highly exposed due to their work with the sick.

=== Monastery and boarding school ===
With other hospitals now established in Tournai, the Saint Andrew hospital became a hospice and permanent residence for the sick and elderly. Under the religious reforms of the Council of Trent, which called for more regular and strictly cloistered religious life, in 1611 under Prioress Marie de la Chapelle, the hospital became a cloistered monastery. At this time, there are 26 sisters within the congregation.

In 1643, the sisters modified their statutes under the influence of Father Antoine Civore (1608-1688), a Belgian Jesuit priest and spiritual director who developed a close relationship with the sisters as well a guide for them, "The secret to the science of the saints". At this point, the congregation began to shift from its focus on the Rule of Saint Augustine to Ignatian spirituality. While the rule remained the source of religious inspiration, the new constitutions emphasise fraternity and apostolic openness. The influence of the Spiritual Exercises is perceptible. By the end of the seventeenth century, the monastery is providing a home for retired women and a small boarding school for girls.

In 1728, Prioress Madeleine de Ghosez built a large chapel with a crypt that served as a necropolis for nuns and residents of the monastery. However, in 1796, the sisters were expelled due to the French Revolution and their monastery confiscated as public property. The community scattered underground but did not disappear.

=== Teaching Congregation ===
Following the ascension of Emperor Napoleon, by 1801 the superior of the small group, Marguerite Hauverlet, had managed to recover a part of the old monastery. However, without their status and privileges as religious, the community was forced to work to support themselves, and established themselves as an educational institution. The Bishop of Tournai, Gaspar Labis, encouraged the community to open another boarding school. With his support, the order was able to obtain their former land and in 1836, build a new convent entirely.

The transition from monastic life according to the Augustinian rule to an apostolic congregation based on Ignatian spirituality took a new phase when eleven sisters of Saint Andrew made a solemn religious profession according to a rule (still provisional) of clearly Ignatian origin. With the assistance of Jesuit Father Pierre Jennesseaux (1804-1884), the sisters again revised their constitutions. The new text, largely inspired by the Jesuit Constitutions, was approved in 1857, under the superiorship of Henriette de Sauw (1797-1862). The congregation - of pontifical right - was apostolic and missionary and no longer monastic in nature. This allowed the congregation to respond to international requests for aid, to which the Bishop of Tournai had been frequently opposed.

In 1859, the sisters opened a training school for other religious to train as teachers. In 1863, the community opened their first houses outside Belgium: in Jersey and in London. In Belgium schools were opened in Ostend, Louvain, and Charleroi in 1884. In the first half of the twentieth century, the congregation opened houses in Brazil (1914) and the Congo (1932).

The motherhouse at Tournai was destroyed in a bombing raid in 1940 during World War two, and a new building was constructed at great expense in Remegnies-Chin, a little north of Tournai.

=== House in Taizé ===
In 1966, at the invitation of Brother Roger, who had visited them in their house at Louvain, the sisters bought a house in Ameugny, near Taizé in Burgundy, where they transferred their community for novice formation. This marked the beginning of an internationalisation of the order's mission. The Ameugny community continues to operate in partnership with the Taizé community, providing hospitality and welcome to pilgrims and visitors to the ecumenical Christian community.

== Bibliography ==
- Marie-Thérèse Lacroix: L'hôpital Saint-Nicolas du Bruille (Saint-André) à Tournai de sa fondation à sa mutation en cloître (1230-1611) (2 tomes), Louvain, 1977, 892pp.
- Marie-Thérèse Lacroix: La vie au monastère Saint-André de Tournai (1611-1796), (2 tomes), Éditions ARSA, Tournai, 1996, 402pp.
- Marie-Thérèse Lacroix: La vie à Saint-André au XIXe siècle (1796-1914), (2 tomes), éditions ARSA, Tournai, 2007, 938pp.

== See also ==
- Congregation of Jesus
- Faithful Companions of Jesus
