= Kamiel Callewaert =

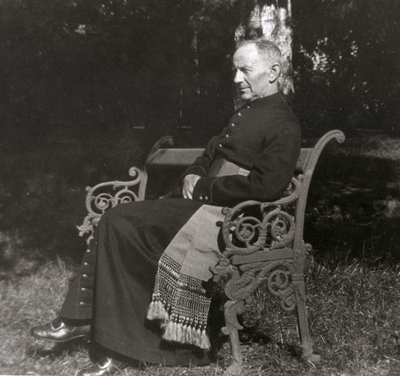
Kamiel Callewaert (1866–1943), Belgian historian, professor and prelate.

Kamiel Callewaert (Zwevegem, 1 January 1866 – Bruges, 6 August 1943) was a Belgian Catholic priest and historian.

== Biography ==
Kamiel Aloys Callewaert was ordained a priest in 1889. He gained a licenciate in canon law at the Catholic University of Leuven in 1892, a topic he would also teach at this university starting at 1910. In 1894, he became a teacher and a school principal. In the same year, he took on the role of president of Bruges seminary. In 1907, he became a canon regular, and on 6 August 1929 he was appointed an honorary prelate.

Callewaert became a board member of the Association of History of Bruges in 1901, and chairman in 1934. He was also a member of the Provincial Commission for Monuments.

Callewaert was a member of the Pontifical Academy of Theology in Rome, and chairman of the Flemish Federation of Liturgy. He had an innovative approach to liturgy and the study of history. He was also closely involved with the foundation of Blindenzorg Licht en Liefde, an association that aids the blind and the visually impaired.

== Publications ==
His publications include:

- Jansenius, évêque d'Ypres: ses derniers moments, sa soumission au S. Siège, d'après des documents inédits: étude de critique historique par des membres du Séminaire d'histoire ecclésiastique, établi à l'Université Catholique de Louvain, Leuven, 1893. (A work on the final hours of Cornelius Jansen)
- Les reliques de sainte Godelieve à Ghistelles et leurs authentiques, 1908
- Nouvelles recherches sur la chronologie médiévale en Flandre, Bruges, 1909
- La durée et le caractère du carême ancien dans l'église latine, Bruges, 1913
- Chartes anciennes de l'abbaye de Zonnebeke, Bruges, 1925
- Licht en liefde voor onze blinden, vereeniging tot bescherming van de belangen der blinden (with co-author Maurice Duyvewaardt), Bruges, 1925.
- De origine cantus Gregoriani, Bruges, 1926.
- Caeremoniale in missa privata et solemni aliisque frequentioribus functionibus liturgicis servandum, Bruges, 1928
- Liturgie en eucharistie, Bruges, 1929.
- Over liturgisch mishooren, Den Bosch, 1930
- Ons kerkelijk jaar: ontstaan, indeeling, beteekenis, vruchtbaarheid, Den Bosch, 1932.
- Liturgische beweging: wat ze niet is, wat ze wel is en moet zijn, Den Bosch, 1933.
- Vasten en Voorvasten, Den Bosch, 1933.
- Eucharistisch en liturgisch leven, Bruges, 1936.
- Sacris erudiri: fragmenta liturgica collecta a monachis sancti Petri de Aldenburgo in Steenbrugge ne pereant, Bruges, 1940
