= Engelbert Sterckx =

Belgian archbishop

His Eminence Engelbert Sterckx
- Cardinal, Archbishop of Mechelen; Primate of Belgium
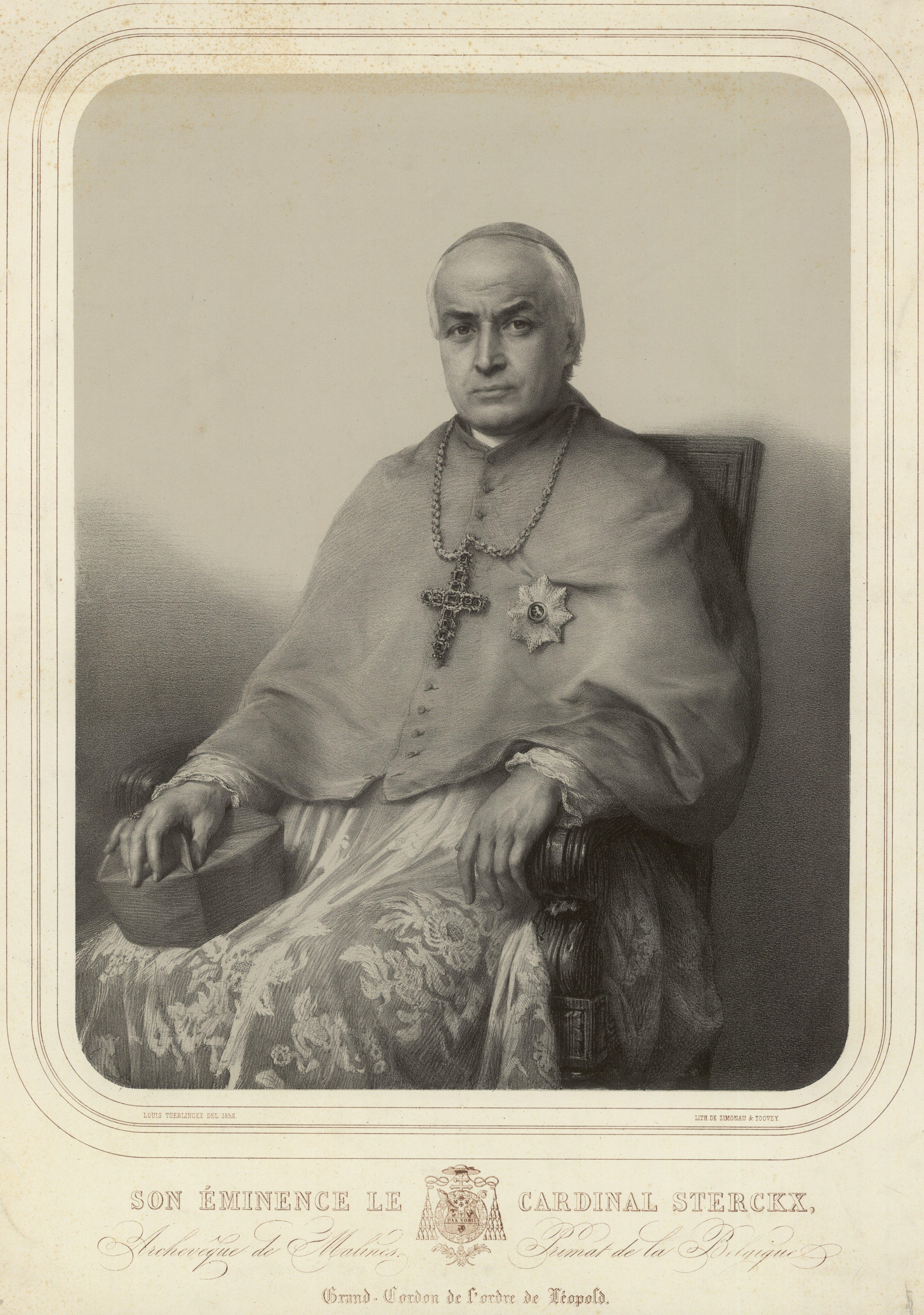
- Church: Roman Catholic
- Archdiocese: Mechelen
- Appointed: 24 February 1832
- In office: 1832-1867
- Predecessor: François Antoine Marie Constantin de Méan et de Beaurieux
- Successor: Victor-Auguste-Isidor Deschamps
- Other post: Cardinal-Priest of San Bartolomeo all’Isola

Orders
- Ordination: 18 February 1815 by Jean Baptiste Robert van Velde de Melroy et Sart-Bomal
- Consecration: 8 April 1832 by Jean Joseph Delplancq
- Created cardinal: 13 September 1838 by Gregory XVI
- Rank: Cardinal-Priest

Personal details
- Born: 2 November 1792 Ophem, Belgium
- Died: 4 December 1867 (aged 75)
- Motto: Pax Vobis
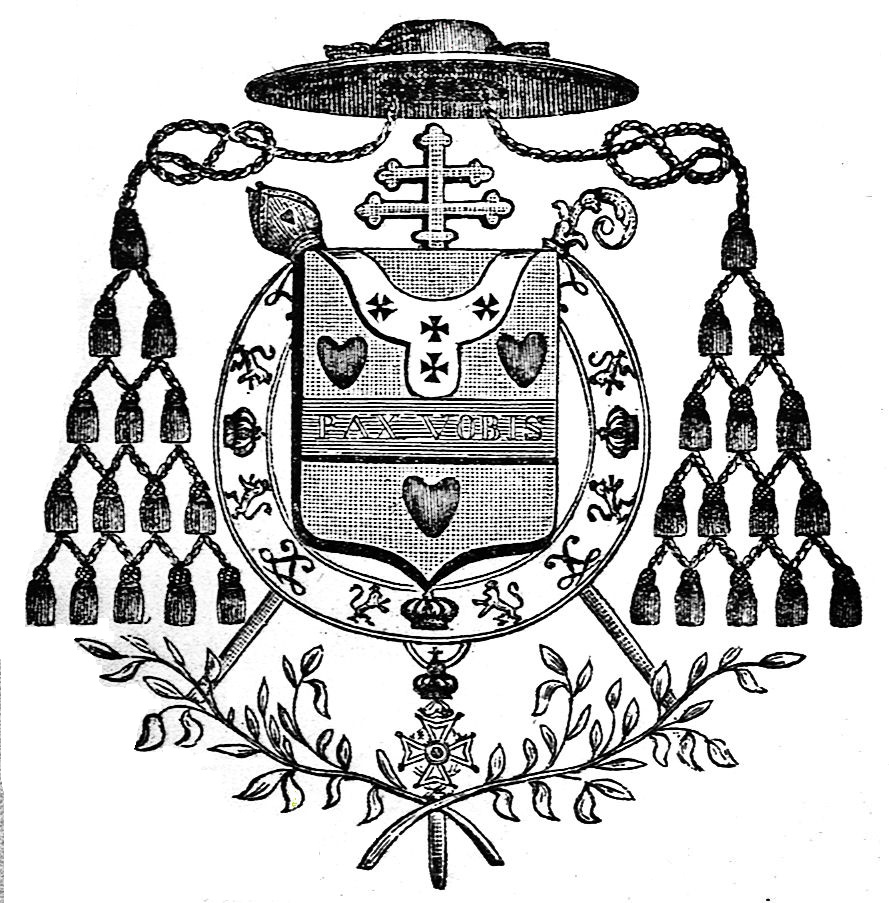
- Coat of arms

Engelbert Sterckx (2 November 1792 – 4 December 1867) was the Archbishop of Mechelen, Belgium, from 1832 to 1867.

== Life ==
Engelbert (Engelbertus) Sterckx was born 2 November 1792 in Ophem, Brabant. His parents were farmers. He began his studies in Vilvoorde, after which he studied humanities at the college of Enghien (1805-1807). After secondary school in Leuven, he entered the Major Seminary, Mechelen, on 18 September 1811 and in 1813 was named subsecretary of the archdiocesan curia of Mechelen in 1813.

Sterckx was ordained, with an age exemption, as priest for the Archdiocese of Mechelen, on 18 February 1815. He was vice-regent and professor of philosophy and moral theology at Mechelen from 1815 to 1821, when he was appointed pastor at Boechout. In 1824 he was appointed archpriest of the Cathedral of Our Lady in Antwerp. In 1827, he was named vicar general to Archbishop Francis Anthony de Méan of Mechelen, and organized the opposition of the clergy to the religious policies of William I.

== Belgian independence ==
In 1830 the southern provinces seceded from the United Kingdom of the Netherlands and established a constitutional monarchy. The people of the south were nearly all Catholic; half were French-speaking. Many outspoken liberals regarded King William I's rule as despotic. There were high levels of unemployment and industrial unrest among the working classes. The liberal faction began to support the Catholics, partly to accomplish its own goals: freedom of education and freedom of the press.

Belgium became a separate ecclesiastical province with Mechelen as an archbishopric and the suffragan dioceses of Liège, Namur, Tournai, Bruges and Ghent.

== Archbishop ==
The new constitution guaranteed religious, educational and press freedom. Although not enthusiastic about all the provisions Sterckx decided they were tolerable. Not a profound thinker, Sterckx was a clever negotiator with a natural inclination to conciliatory pragmatism. He became Archbishop on 24 February 1832, but his consecration was initially delayed by rumors against him of liberalism. In 1833 he baptised Louis-Philippe, Crown Prince of Belgium, the eldest son of Leopold I of the Belgians.

Archbishop Sterckx took full advantage of the new freedoms to completely reorganize his Archdiocese, establishing schools, colleges, monasteries, charities and minor seminaries in Hoogstraten and Waver. The University of Mechelen was mainly the work of Sterckx, and was a revival of the famous University of Leuven, which had been founded in 1425 and closed in 1797. Sterckx wrote to Pope Gregory XVI on 14 November 1833 regarding the proposed establishment of a Catholic university for Belgium, and Gregory replied to him and the other Belgian bishops on 13 December 1833 in a letter entitled Maiori certo, granting his approval. Gregory referred to the tradition of granting pontifical approval to the establishment of Catholic seats of learning. It opened in November 1834 and moved to Leuven in December 1835.

During the consistory of 13 September 1838, the Pope appointed him as a cardinal with the title of cardinal-priest of St. Bartholomew en l'Ile (San Bartolomeo all'Isola). He did not participate in the conclave of 1846 at which Pope Pius IX was chosen.

In 1842, Sterckx issued a decree regarding plainsong and the following year established a commission to prepare a new edition of choral books. The Mechlin Gradual and Vesperal was published in 1848.

In 1857 an anticlerical Liberal government came to power under the leadership of Charles Rogier and later Walthère Frère-Orban. Sterckx strongly opposed all interference, such as the law on cemeteries of 1862. In 1863, 1864 and 1867 he hosted a series of influential Catholic Congresses in Mechelen with the aim of invigorating Catholic social, cultural and political engagement.

Cardinal Sterckx died on 4 December 1867, in Mechelen, where his remains rest in the crypt of the archbishops in St. Rombout's Cathedral.

== Honours ==
- Grand Cordon in the Order of Leopold.
- Knight Grand Cross in the Order of Leopold.

== See also ==
- Archbishopric of Mechelen-Brussels

Catholic Church titles
Preceded by François de Méan	15th Archbishop of Mechelen; 1832-1867	Succeeded by Victor-Auguste-Isidor Deschamps

== Sources ==
- Engelbert Cardinal Sterckx ^{[self-published]}
