= Jean Joseph Delplancq =

- Diocese: Diocese of Tournai
- See: Notre-Dame de Tournai
- Appointed: 1829
- Predecessor: Vacant (1819–1829)
- Successor: Gaspard-Joseph Labis (1835–1872)
- Previous post: Dean of Hannut

Orders
- Ordination: June 1791
- Consecration: 25 October 1829

Personal details
- Born: 30 January 1767 Thieu, County of Hainaut, Austrian Netherlands
- Died: 27 July 1834 (aged 67) Tournai, Province of Hainaut, Kingdom of Belgium
- Education: Collège de Roeulx
- Alma mater: Old University of Leuven
- Motto: Deus mihi adjutor

Jean Joseph Delplancq (1767–1834) was a 19th-century bishop of Tournai and one of the founders of the Catholic University of Leuven.

== Life ==
Delplancq was born in Thieu on 30 January 1767. He was educated at the college in Le Rœulx and at the Old University of Leuven. He was ordained to the priesthood in 1791, was appointed parish priest in Ville-en-Hesbaye in 1803, and in 1827 became dean of Hannut. The diocese of Tournai had been vacant since 1819, and in 1829 he was appointed to the see. He was consecrated as bishop of Tournai on 25 October 1829. After the Belgian Revolution of 1830 had guaranteed freedom of association and freedom of education, he established schools run by the De La Salle Brothers in Tournai, Peruwelz and Mons. He was among the founders of the Catholic University of Mechelen in 1834 (moved to Leuven in 1835), convincing his fellow bishops that it would be best to seek papal approval before pressing ahead with the foundation. He died in Tournai on 27 July 1834.
