= Diocese of Bruges =

Catholic ecclesiastical territory in Belgium

Diocese of Bruges Dioecesis Brugensis: Bisdom Brugge; Diocèse de Bruges; Bistum Brügge

Catholic
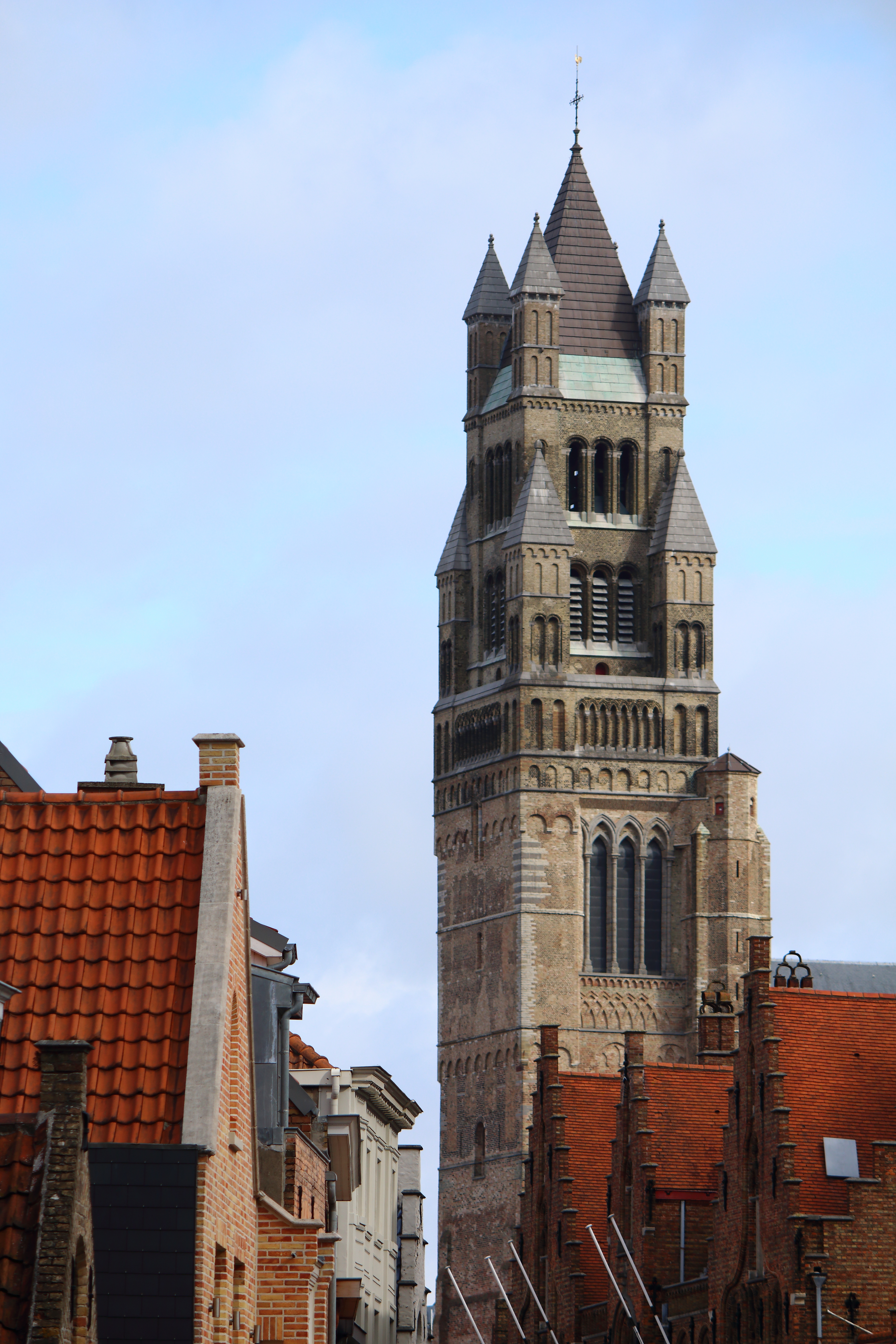
- St. Salvator's Cathedral in Bruges

Location
- Country: Belgium
- Territory: West Flanders
- Episcopal conference: Episcopal Conference of Belgium
- Ecclesiastical province: Mechelen–Brussels
- Metropolitan: Mechelen–Brussels
- Coordinates: 51°12′18″N 3°13′21″E

Statistics
- Area: 3,144 km^{2} (1,214 sq mi)
- Population: Total; Catholics: (as of 2023); ▲1,211,193; ▲855,940 (70.7%)
- Parishes: ▼335

Information
- Denomination: Catholic Church
- Sui iuris church: Latin Church
- Rite: Roman Rite
- Established: 12 May 1559
- Cathedral: St. Salvator's Cathedral in Bruges
- Patron saint: Donatian of Reims
- Secular priests: ▼307 diocesan (2023); ▼103 religious; ▼86 permanent deacons

Current leadership
- Pope: Leo XIV
- Bishop: Lodewijk Aerts
- Metropolitan Archbishop: Jozef De Kesel

Map
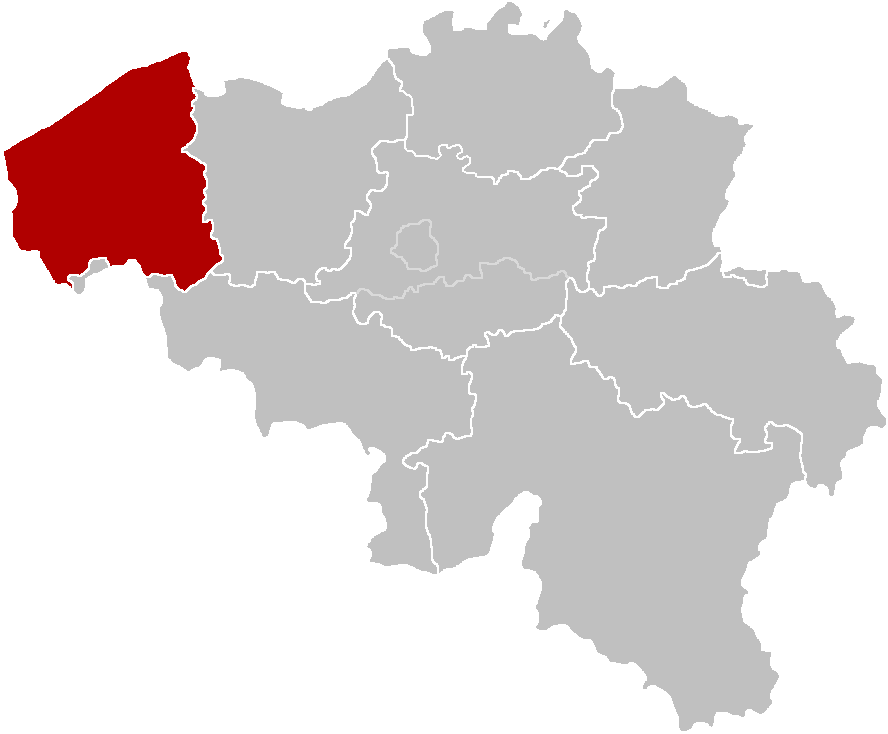
- The diocese of Bruges, coextensive with the province of West Flanders

Website
- www.otheo.be/bisdom-brugge

The Diocese of Bruges (Latin: Dioecesis Brugensis; Dutch: Bisdom Brugge) is a Latin Church diocese of the Catholic Church in Belgium. It is a suffragan in the ecclesiastical province of Mechelen–Brussels, which covers all of Belgium.

A diocese from 1558 to its suppression in 1801, in 1832 it became a pre-diocesan apostolic vicariate as the Apostolic Administration of West Flanders. Its territory coincides with West Flanders.

The episcopal see of the diocese is St. Salvator's Cathedral, dedicated to Our Savior, in Bruges, West Flanders, which is also a minor basilica. The patron saint of the diocese is Donatian of Reims, so the cathedral is also known as Sint-Salvators- en Donaaskathedraal.

== Statistics ==
In 2023, the diocese served 855,940 Catholics (70.7% of 1,211,193 total) on 3,144 square kilometres (1,214 sq mi) in 335 parishes and 65 missions with 410 priests (307 diocesan, 103 religious), 91 deacons, 1,074 lay religious (145 brothers, 929 sisters) and 3 seminarians.

== History ==
An earlier diocese of Bruges was established on 12 May 1558, on territory split off from the Diocese of Tournai, as part of the great Habsburg reform of the church in the then Spanish Low Countries. Its see, St. Donatian's Cathedral, was destroyed in a fire in 1799 during the aftermath of the French Revolution.

During the reforms under the Napoleonic Concordate, the diocese was suppressed on 15 July 1801 and its territory merged into the Diocese of Ghent.

On 17 December 1832, shortly after the independence of Belgium, the territory was restored as the pre-diocesan Apostolic Administration of West Flanders. On 27 May 1834, the territory was again promoted to diocese and renamed after its see, Bruges, while the incumbent Apostolic Administrator became Suffragan Bishop. On 31 May 1967 the diocese lost a portion of territory to the much older Diocese of Tournai, shortly after a reshuffle of provincial borders involving a few municipalities, notably Mouscron being transferred to the province of Hainaut (to which the bishopric of Tournai is now limited).

In 1985 the diocese of Bruges experienced a papal visit from Pope John Paul II, who on 17 May gave a homily on the horrors of war at Ypres as part of his pastoral visit to the Low Countries.

A 2010 scandal saw Bishop Roger Vangheluwe, a confessed and hardly remorseful pederast, forced into early retirement.

== Ordinaries ==
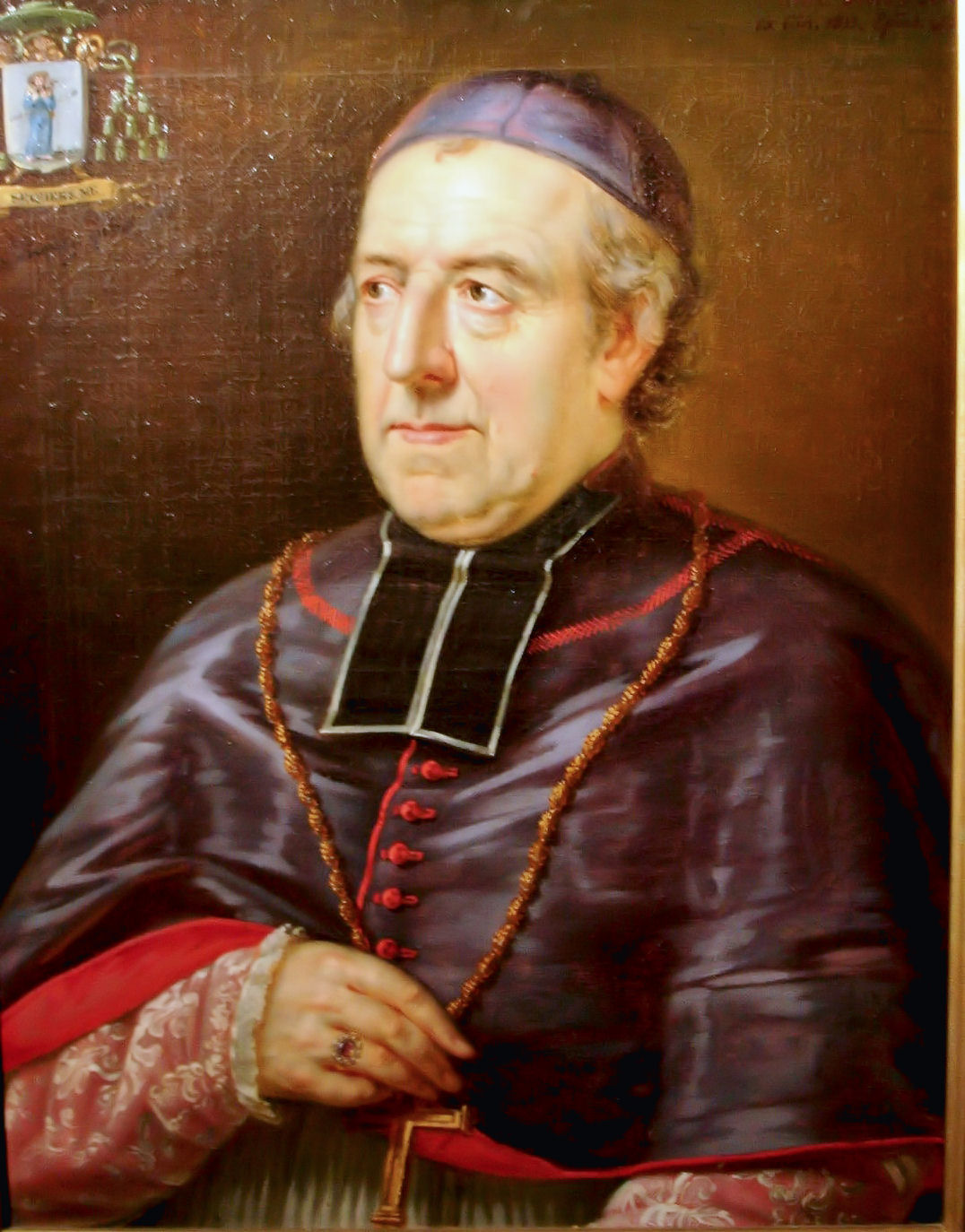
Franciscus Renatus Boussen, eighteenth bishop of Bruges

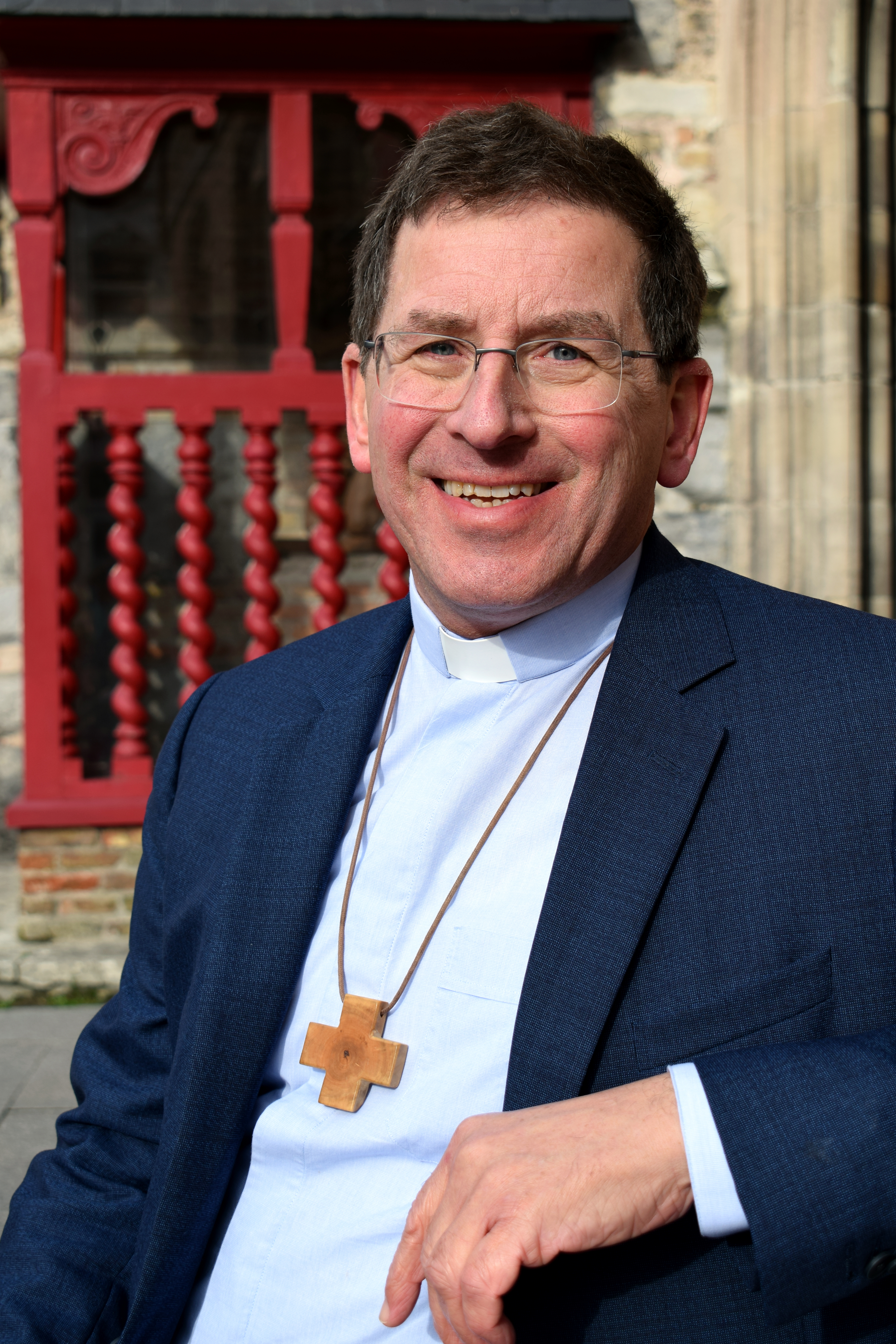
Lode Aerts, bishop as of 2016

Suffragan Bishops (first diocese)

- 1560–1567: Petrus Curtius (Petrus De Corte)
- 1569–1594: Remigius Driutius (Remi Drieux)
- 1596–1602: Mathias Lambrecht
- 1604–1616: Charles Philippe de Rodoan
- 1616–1620: Anthonius Triest (also bishop of Ghent)
- 1623–1629: Denis Stoffels
- 1630–1639: Servaas de Quinckere
- 1642–1649: Nicolaas de Haudion
- 1651–1660: Carolus van den Bosch (afterwards bishop of Ghent)
- 1662–1668: Robert de Haynin
- 1668–1671: Vacant (diocesan administrator Charles Geleyns)
- 1671–1681: François de Baillencourt
- 1682–1689: Humbertus Guilielmus de Precipiano (also Archbishop of Mechelen)
- 1691–1706: Guilielmus (Willem) Bassery
- 1706–1716: Vacant
- 1716–1742: Hendrik Jozef van Susteren
- 1743–1753: Jan-Baptist de Castillon
- 1754–1775: Joannes-Robertus Caimo
- 1777–1794: Felix Brenart
- Suppressed

Apostolic Administrator of West Flanders

- Franciscus Renatus Boussen (21 January 1833 – 27 May 1834 see next), Titular Bishop of Ptolemais (17 December 1832 – 23 June 1834), Coadjutor Bishop of Ghent (Belgium) (17 December 1832 – 23 June 1834)

Suffragan Bishops (restored)

- 1834–1848: Franciscus Renatus Boussen (see previous)
- 1848–1864: Joannes-Baptista Malou
- 1864–1894: Johan Joseph Faict
- 1894–1895: Petrus De Brabandere
- 1895–1931: Gustavus Waffelaert
- 1931–1952: Henricus Lamiroy
- 1952–1984: Emiel-Jozef De Smedt
- 1984–2010: Roger Joseph Vangheluwe
- 2010–2015: Jozef De Kesel, later promoted Metropolitan Archbishop of Mechelen-Brussels
- 2016–present: Lode Aerts

== See also ==
- List of Catholic churches in Belgium
- List of Catholic dioceses in Belgium
- List of Christian monasteries in Belgium
