= Major Seminary in Bruges =

Coordinates: 51.2181°N 3.2305°E

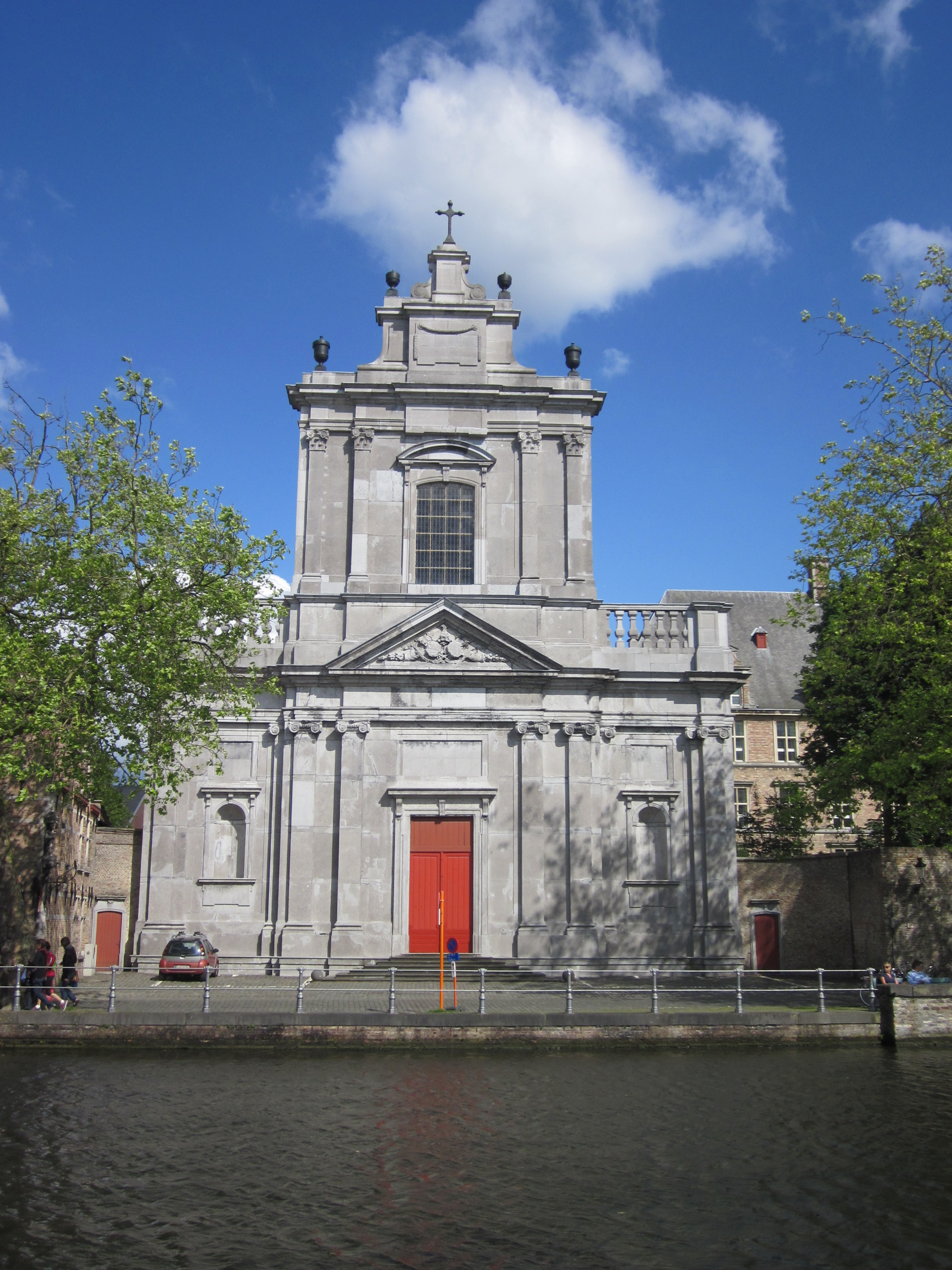
The Heilige-Maagd-Mariakerk of the Grootseminarie in Bruges

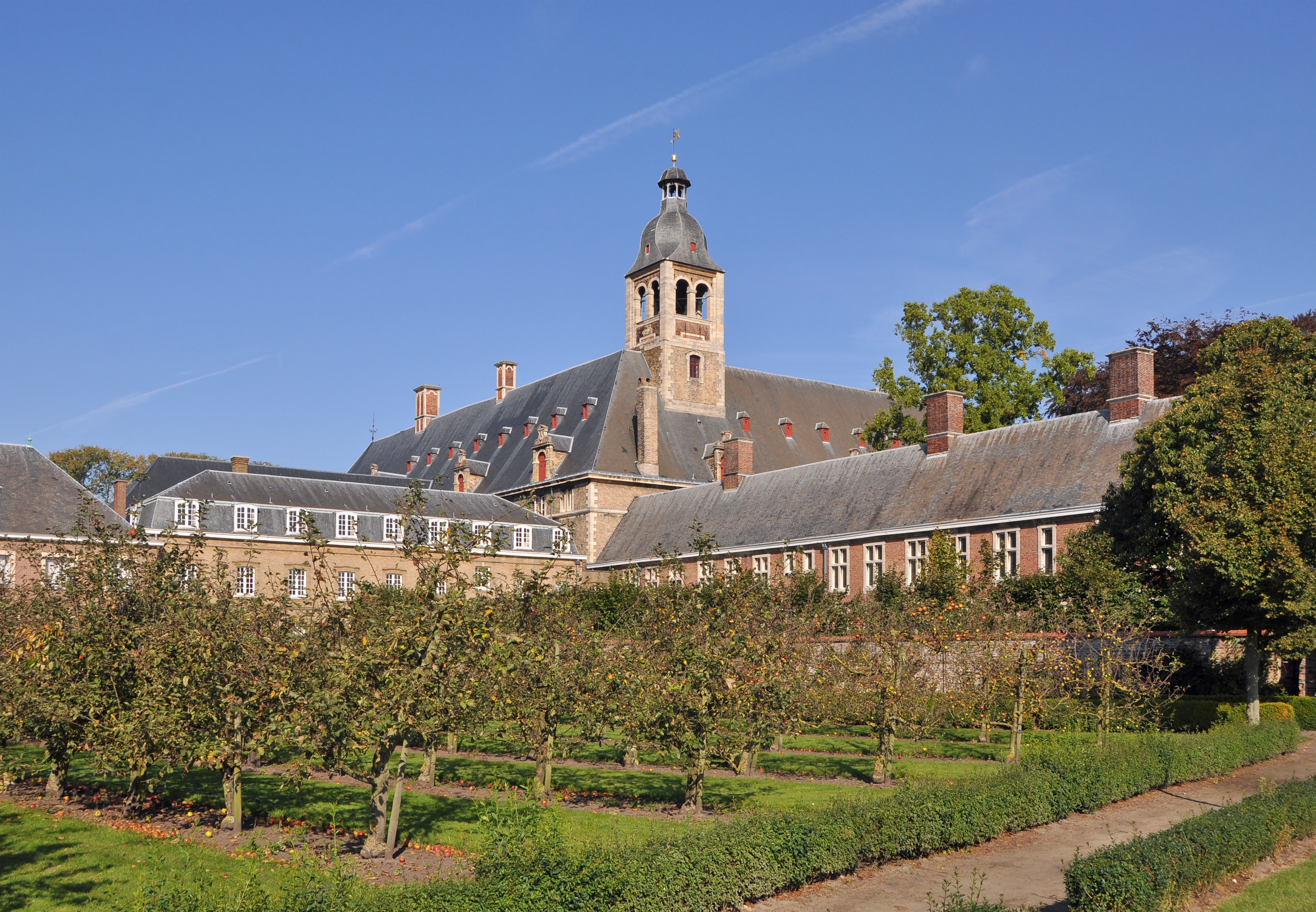
Seminary garden

The Major Seminary in Bruges, in Dutch Grootseminarie, is a centre for training and formation in the Roman Catholic Diocese of Bruges, formerly used as the seminary for preparing candidates for the diocesan priesthood. It is located on the Potterierei in Bruges.

== History ==
Since 2018, candidates for the priesthood from all Flemish dioceses have been trained at the Johannes XXIII Seminary, Leuven, but the Major Seminary in Bruges continues to provide other educational opportunities, such as the Theologische academie and the School voor geloof. The seminary has a large library and is housed in the 17th-century buildings of the former Ten Duinen Abbey, established in Bruges by Bernard Campmans in 1627. The buildings also house a branch of the United Nations University which works closely with the College of Europe.

== Presidents ==
The president of the seminary was one of the leading priests of the diocese and usually an honorary canon of the cathedral chapter.

The presidents:

- Louis-Joseph Delebecque (1798-1864) - president 1833-1838
- Livinus Bruneel (1798-1885) - president 1838-1869
- Petrus Dessein (1811) - president 1869-1884
- Henri Delbar (1833-1894) - president 1884-1899
- Henri Vandenberghe (1848-1932) - president 1899-1907
- Kamiel Callewaert (1866-1943) - president 1907-1934
- Achiel Verhamme (1891-1959) - president 1934-1952
- Maurits De Keyzer (1906-1994) - president 1952-1961
- Joris Van Eeghem (1921-1999) - president 1961-1970
- Paul Declerck (1922-1981) - president 1970-1981
- Adelbert Denaux (born 1938) - president 1981-1992
- Eric Vanden Berghe (1948-2006) - president 1992-2006
- Koen Vanhoutte (born 1957) - president 2006-2016
- Philippe Hallein (born 1972) - president 2016-2018
