= Vineam Domini =

Vineam Domini Sabaoth Apostolic constitution of Pope Clement XI
- Signature date: 16 July 1705
- Subject: Declared that "obediential silence" is not a satisfactory response to the Formula of Submission for the Jansenists

Vineam Domini Sabaoth is an apostolic constitution in the form of a papal bull promulgated by Pope Clement XI in 1705 which declared that "obediential silence" is not a satisfactory response to the Formula of Submission for the Jansenists. (Note: The Latin words are "obsequioso [...] silentio". English translations include: "obediential silence", in 2012; "submissive silence", in 1991; "respectful silence" in 1912; "obsequious silence", in 1905;)

== Background ==
In 1701, a written decision was given by faculty of theology scholars at the College of Sorbonne in response to doctrinal questions addressed to them. The questions, from a priest, ostensibly the confessor of a dying ecclesiastic, included whether a priest can absolve a dying penitent in the Sacrament of Penance when the penitent is a priest who confessed that he while condemns the five propositions listed by Pope Innocent X in Cum occasione as heretical; but, since it was not clear to the penitent that these propositions are actually contained in Cornelius Jansen's Augustinus, the penitent thought it sufficient to observe a "respectful silence" (French: silence respectueux) concerning this question of fact, and, with this restriction, signed the Formula of Submission for the Jansenists prescribed by Pope Alexander VII in Regiminis Apostolici.

Forty doctors of the Sorbonne, among them Louis Ellies Dupin, Nicolas Petitpied, Jacques-Bénigne Bossuet, Sarrasin, and Noël Alexandre, decided that absolution could not be withheld, since the case was neither new nor extraordinary, and since the penitent's opinion was not condemned by the Church. Though the decision was given secretly on 20 July 1701, Jansenists published the case in July, 1702, with the signatures of the forty doctors of the Sorbonne. Whoever may have been its author, Roulland, a doctor of the Sorbonne, edited it, and Cardinal Louis Antoine de Noailles, archbishop of Paris, knew of its existence before it was published, and is even said to have promised his own signature.

== Publication ==
In order that, for the future, every occasion of error may be prevented, and that all sons of the Catholic Church may learn to listen to the Church herself, not in silence only (for, "even the wicked are silent in darkness" (1S 2,9)), but with an interior obedience, which is the true obedience of an orthodox man, let it be known that by this constitution of ours, to be valid forever, the obedience which is due to the aforesaid apostolic constitutions is not satisfied by any obsequious silence; but the sense of that book of Jansen which has been condemned in the five propositions (see n. 1092 ff.) mentioned above, and whose meaning the words of those propositions express clearly, must be rejected and condemned as heretical by all the faithful of Christ, not only by word of mouth but also in heart; and one may not lawfully subscribe to the above formula with any other mind, heart, or belief, so that all who hold or preach or teach or assert by word or writing anything contrary to what all these propositions mean, and to what each single one means we declare, decree, state, and ordain, with this same apostolic authority, that all, as transgressors of the aforementioned apostolic constitutions, come under each and every individual censure and penalty of those constitutions.

— Pope Clement XI, Vineam Domini

Its appearance caused a great stir among the Catholics of France, for the solution of the case was equivalent to the revival of one phase of Jansenism, the opinion that the pope has not the power to decide on questions on doctrinal fact, i.e. whether a certain book contains or does not contain errors against faith. The solution was condemned by Clement XI in his papal brief Cum nuper, dated 12 February 1703. The pope at the same time urged King Louis XIV of France and Noailles to take energetic measures against all recalcitrants.

Five doctors of the Sorbonne who refused to submit were banished. The controversy continued, Louis XIV, seconded by King Philip V of Spain, requested the pope to issue a document condemning the so-called respectful silence. Since Louis XIV insisted that the constitution should contain no expressions contrary to the Gallican Liberties, its issue was somewhat delayed and finally, after its contents had been communicated to the king, Vineam Domini Sabaoth was promulgated at Rome on 16 July 1705.

Vineam Domini Sabaoth begins with a confirmation of the three constitutions – Cum occasione, Ad sanctam beati Petri sedem, and Regiminis Apostolici – that were previously promulgated against Jansenism and contains their entire text. Then defends Pope Clement IX and Pope Innocent XII against calumnies and misinterpretations of the Jansenists. To this is added a severe rebuke of those who, by what they term respectful silence, pretend to obey the apostolic constitutions while in reality deceive the Church and the Holy See. Vineam Domini Sabaoth ends with a declaration that a respectful silence is not sufficient, (Note: "obsequioso illo silentio nequaquam satisfieri") and that all the faithful are obliged to reject and condemn as heretical, not only with their mouth, but also with their heart, the sense which was condemned in the previously mentioned five propositions in Augustinus and which the words of the propositions naturally have.

== Aftermath ==
Vineam Domini Sabaoth arrived in France while the Assembly of the French clergy was in session. It was accepted by the Assembly on 21 August; not, however, before it had been decided to accompany the constitution with the declaration that, "the papal constitutions are binding on the whole Church when they have been accepted by the bishops", thus making it appear that Vineam Domini Sabaoth received its binding force by the acceptance of the bishops. On 31 August, it was made a state law. It was accepted by all the French bishops with the exception of Pierre-Jean-François de Percin de Montgaillard, bishop of Saint-Pons, who published a mandement defending "respectful silence". (Note: The mandement was censured by Clement XI on 18 January 1710, and Montgaillard submitted in a letter to Clement XI on 28 February 1713.) The Sorbonne accepted the Bull on 1 September 1705. The nuns of Port-Royal refused to accept it, except with certain restrictions, and, in consequence, the king obtained the pope's permission to suppress their monastery.

On 31 August 1706, Clement XI addressed a papal brief to Noailles and another to Louis XIV, in which he scathingly reproved the French bishops for "usurping the plenitude of power which God has given exclusively to the Chair of St. Peter", and demanded that they recant the scandalous declaration which they had appended to Vineam Domini Sabaoth. After various evasions Noailles was finally prevailed upon, as the president of the Assembly, to sign, on 29 June 1711, a document drawn up by Clement XI which expressly stated that the acceptance of the bishops is not necessary to give the papal constitutions their binding force.

== See also ==
- Formulary controversy
