= Antonius Triest =

Roman Catholic bishop

- Bishop of Ghent
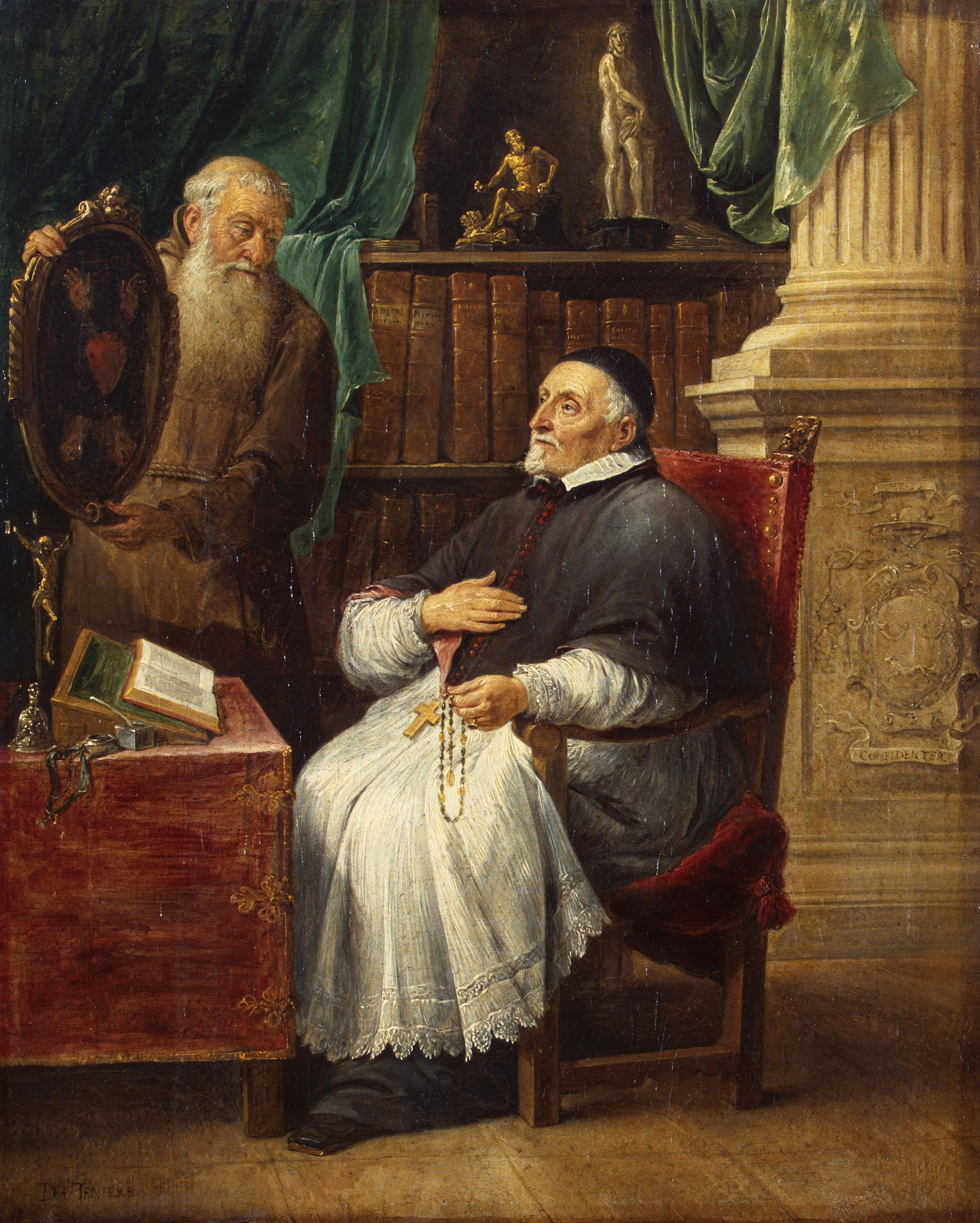
- Portrait of Antonius Triest and his brother by David Teniers the Younger
- Province: Mechelen
- Diocese: Ghent
- See: St Bavo's
- Installed: 1622
- Term ended: 1657
- Predecessor: Jacobus Boonen
- Successor: Carolus van den Bosch
- Other post: Bishop of Bruges

Orders
- Ordination: 1602
- Consecration: 1617

Personal details
- Born: 1576 Beveren
- Died: 28 May 1657 (aged 80–81) Ghent
- Denomination: Roman Catholic
- Parents: Philippe Triest, lord of Auweghem, and Marie van Royen
- Education: Leuven University

Antonius Triest (in Dutch sometimes Antoon; in French Antoine) (1576 – 28 May 1657), was the fifth bishop of Bruges and the seventh bishop of Ghent.

== Early life ==
Anthonius was born in the castle of Ten Walle in Beveren in 1576, son of Philip Triest, knight, lord of Auweghem, and Marie van Royen. He studied at the Augustinian college in Ghent and at Leuven University, graduating Licentiate of Laws. On 8 May 1596 he was appointed to a canonry in St Bavo's Cathedral, Ghent, becoming archdeacon in 1599. On 5 July 1610 he became dean of the chapter of St. Donatian's Cathedral, Bruges, in which capacity he was delegate of the First Estate in the States of Flanders.

== Episcopal career ==
On 10 August 1616 Triest was named bishop of Bruges, and he was consecrated as such on 9 July 1617. From 25 November 1617 to 28 January 1618 he was absent from his diocese on a mission to reconcile the Duke of Lorraine and his brother, the Count of Vaudement.

On 10 July 1620 he was named bishop of Ghent, in succession to Jacobus Boonen, who had become archbishop of Mechelen. Due to various delays he continued to act as bishop of Bruges until he could be replaced there, and was installed in his new see only on 7 April 1622. As bishop he supported charitable institutions such as the newly established mount of piety (that provided interest-free credit to the poor) and an orphanage for girls, re-organised Sunday schools, encouraged the foundation of confraternities and patronised the arts. In 1623 he acquired a new property to house the Major Seminary of Ghent (first founded 1569). In 1642, to mark the 25th anniversary of his episcopal ordination and 20th anniversary of installation as bishop of Ghent, he presented 200 poor men and women with clothing, bread, wine, beer and money.

His intelligent interest in the visual arts gained him the friendship of Peter Paul Rubens, Anthony van Dyck and David Teniers the Younger. He commissioned his own tomb from François Duquesnoy, and it was completed in 1651.

== Papal interdict ==
Triest fell into disgrace through his refusal to publish the 1643 papal condemnation of Cornelius Jansen's Augustinus. In 1651 he justified his continued resistance by issuing his episcopal order Noveritis, a document which was condemned by the Holy Office. He was summoned to Rome to answer before the Pope, but on 29 August 1652 the Council of Brabant issued an order under the jus de non evocando forbidding him from pleading his case before a foreign tribunal. On 19 December 1652 Innocent X placed Triest, and his colleague Jacobus Boonen, under interdict and suspended them from their episcopal functions. In Cum occasione the Pope formally declared five propositions derived from Augustinus as heretical. Triest submitted and on 23 September 1653 received absolution from the papal internuncio, Andrea Mangelli, and was reinstated in his functions.

Triest died in Ghent on 28 May 1657. By his will he left a third of his wealth to the poor of the city.

Catholic Church titles
Preceded by Charles Philippe de Rodoan	Bishop of Bruges; 1616–1620/22	Succeeded by Denis Stoffels
Preceded by Jacobus Boonen	Bishop of Ghent; 1620/22–1657	Succeeded by Carolus van den Bosch
