= Carolus van den Bosch =

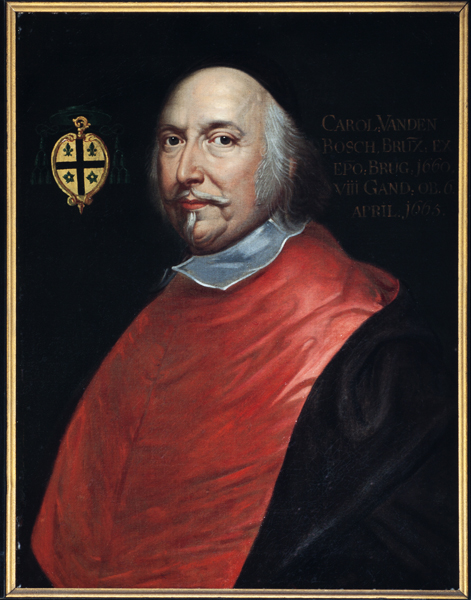
Portrait from Ghent Cathedral

Carolus van den Bosch (1597–1665) was a clergyman in the Habsburg Netherlands who served successively as bishop of Bruges (1651–1660) and bishop of Ghent (1660–1665).

== Life ==
Van den Bosch was born in Brussels and baptised in Brussels Minster on 22 May 1597. His parents were Petrus van den Bosch, president of the Council of Namur, and Maria Maes (daughter of Jacobus Maes). During his childhood his father transferred to the administration of Upper Guelders and Carolus was educated at the Jesuit college in Roermond before studying philosophy at Pope's College, Leuven. He then spent five years studying theology and canon law at the Collegium Germanicum in Rome. Returning to the Low Countries, he graduated Doctor Utriusque Juris from Leuven University. He was ordained to the priesthood by Jacobus Boonen on 1 April 1623.

Van den Bosch became a canon of the Collegiate Church of St Waudru, then of Ghent Cathedral (1628), and in 1630 dean of St. Donatian's Cathedral in Bruges. He served as a chaplain to Archduke Leopold Wilhelm of Austria during his time as Governor-General of the Spanish Netherlands, and as vicar general to two successive bishops of Bruges, Servaas de Quinckere and Nicolaas de Haudion. On 6 January 1650, Leopold Wilhelm named Van den Bosch as Haudion's successor, and the appointment was confirmed by Pope Innocent X on 17 April 1651. He was consecrated as bishop of Bruges in St Donatian's Cathedral on 23 July 1651 by Antonius Triest, bishop of Ghent, with Gaspard Nemius of Antwerp and apostolic vicar Jacobus de la Torre as co-consecrators.

As bishop he made over 50 visitations of parishes, and took a particular interest in catechetics. He consecrated the chapel of the English convent in Bruges on 22 August 1650, the new church of the Carmelite convent in Bruges on 12 November 1651, the new parish church in Lapscheure on 25 July 1652, and the chapel of the hospital for the blind in Bruges on 18 August 1652. He had long-running difficulties with the Abbey of St. Peter in Oudenburg, both regarding monastic discipline and the privileges the institution claimed.

On 15 March 1659, Pope Alexander VII appointed Van den Bosch as bishop of Ghent in succession to Antonius Triest. He made his entry into his new see on 23 July 1660. Meanwhile, he had on 8 June 1660 been appointed a councillor of the Brussels Council of State. In Ghent he took a particular interest in promoting the education of the young, and the theological and pastoral training of priests.

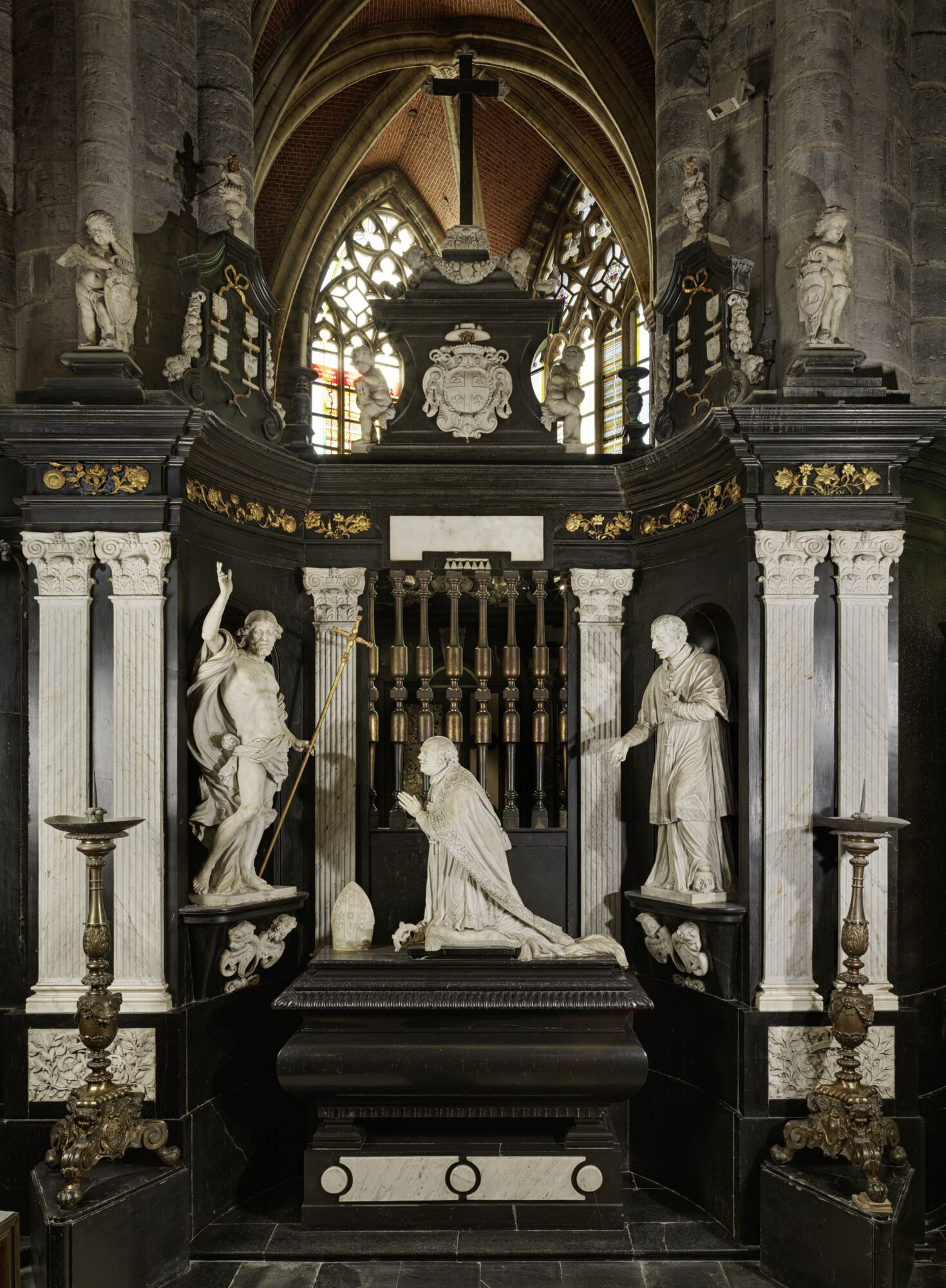
Monumental tomb in Ghent Cathedral

He died in Ghent on 5 April 1665. By his will he left his extensive library to the Jesuit house in Bruges. His monumental tomb in Ghent Cathedral is now listed heritage.
