= Andrea Mangelli =

Italian papal diplomat

Personal details
- Born: Forlì
- Died: 30 October 1655 Brussels
- Denomination: Roman Catholic

Andrea Mangelli (died 30 October 1655) was a papal diplomat. An Italian, he began his diplomatic career in 1642 as auditor of the nunciature in Madrid, where the nuncio was Giovanni Battista Pamphili (later Pope Innocent X).

In 1651 Mangelli was appointed internuncio to Brussels, arriving at his new posting in 1652. He served in Brussels until 1655. It was during his time as the pope's diplomatic representative in Flanders that the Jansenist controversy came to a head, with extraordinary measures taken to bring Jacobus Boonen, archbishop of Mechelen, and Anthonius Triest, Bishop of Ghent, into line with the papal condemnation of Cornelius Jansen's Augustinus. This also entailed jurisdictional disputes about authority over the Flemish church between Mangelli and Charles de Hovyne, president of the Privy Council in Brussels.

Mangelli died in Brussels on 30 October 1655. His correspondence as internuncio was published in 1993.
