= Nicolaas de Haudion =

Bishop of Bruges (1642–1649)

- Bishop of Bruges
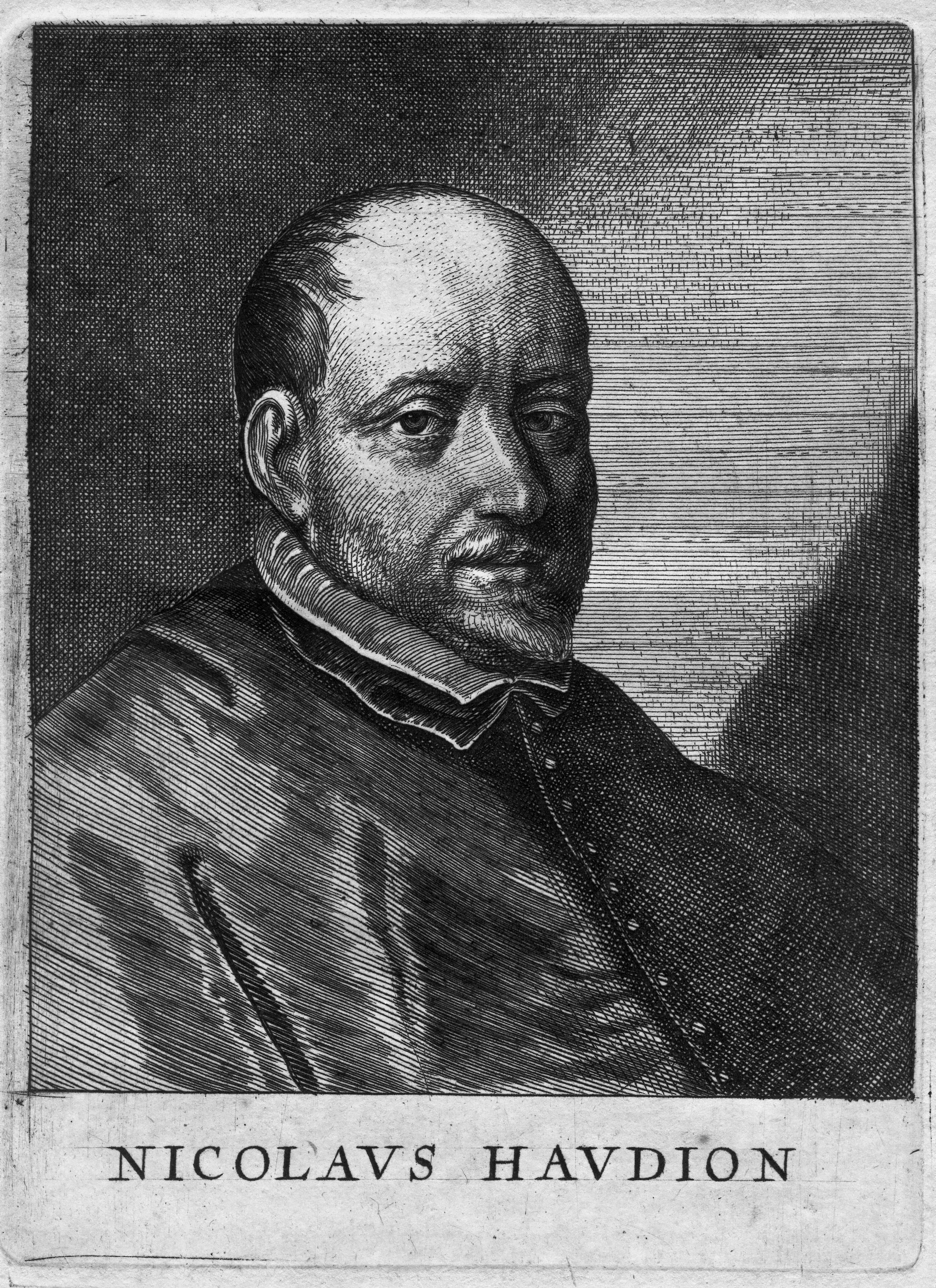
- Engraved portrait from Antonius Sanderus, Flandria Illustrata, 1641-1644.
- Province: Mechelen
- Diocese: Bruges
- See: St. Donatian's Cathedral
- Installed: 1642
- Term ended: 1649
- Predecessor: Denis Stoffels
- Successor: Carolus van den Bosch
- Other post: Provost of Saint Bavo's Cathedral, Ghent

Orders
- Consecration: 24 April 1642

Personal details
- Died: 1649 Leuven, Duchy of Brabant, Habsburg Netherlands
- Education: Leuven University

Nicolas de Haudion (died 1649) was a nobleman from the Duchy of Brabant who became the eighth bishop of Bruges in the County of Flanders.

== Career ==
Haudion, descended from a noble family in the Duchy of Brabant that held the lordship of Guiberchies, graduated licentiate of Sacred Theology and licentiate of laws from Leuven University. In 1615, he was appointed to a canonry of Saint Bavo's Cathedral, Ghent, serving there as official, and from October 1628 as dean. Appointed provost, he sat in the States of Flanders as a representative of the clerical estate. In 1641 he was nominated for succession to the vacant see of Bruges, receiving papal confirmation from Urban VIII, and episcopal consecration from Jacobus Boonen, Archbishop of Mechelen, with Antoine Triest of Ghent and Josse Bouckaert of Ypres as co-consecrators. His motto was Verè et integrè.

On leaving Ghent Haudion was given a silver reliquary containing a relic of Macarius of Ghent as a farewell present from the bishop and chapter. He donated this to Bruges cathedral, and instituted an annual commemoration of the translation of the relic on 9 May, which was first celebrated in 1644.

Haudion took part in the assemblies of bishops held in Brussels on 23 January and 3 February 1645 to consult on the reform of clerical morals, and to call for royal legislation against duelling, immorality and luxury. He died in Leuven on 24 September 1649, having governed his diocese for nine years. His remains were transported to Bruges and interred in the cathedral choir. He bequeathed much of his wealth to the poor, and a considerable sum to the Mount of Piety in Bruges.
