= Regiminis Apostolici =

Papal bull

Regiminis Apostolici Apostolic constitution of Pope Alexander VII
- Signature date: 15 February 1665
- Subject: Defined the Formula of Submission for the Jansenists

Regiminis Apostolici is an apostolic constitution in the form of a papal bull promulgated by Pope Alexander VII in 1665 which required, according to the Enchiridion symbolorum, "all ecclesiastical personnel and teachers" to subscribe to an included formulary, the Formula of Submission for the Jansenists:

I, N., submit to the apostolic constitution of the Supreme Pontiff Innocent X dated May 31, 1653, and to the constitution of the Supreme Pontiff Alexander VII dated October 16, 1656, and, with a sincere heart, I reject and condemn the five propositions taken from the book of Cornelius Jansen entitled Augustinus and in the sense understood by that same author, just as the Apostolic See has condemned them by the two above-mentioned constitutions, and I so swear: So help me God, and these holy Gospels of God.

The constitution was requested by King Louis XIV of France. In Regiminis Apostolici, Alexander VII required all clergy to reject and condemn the five propositions and the teachings of Jansen. It cited Innocent X's 1653 constitution Cum occasione which condemned five propositions found in Cornelius Jansen's Augustinus as heretical. It also cited Alexander VII's 1656 constitution Ad sanctam beati Petri sedem which judged the meaning and intention of Jansen's words in Augustinus, and confirmed and renewed Cum occasione promulgated by Innocent X in 1653.

== See also ==
- Formulary controversy
