= Ad sanctam beati Petri sedem =

17th century papal bull

Ad sanctam beati Petri sedem Latin for 'From the Holy See of the Blessed Peter' Apostolic constitution of Pope Alexander VII
- Signature date: 16 October 1656
- Subject: Renewed condemnation of Cornelius Jansen's Augustinus

Ad sanctam beati Petri sedem is an apostolic constitution in the form of a papal bull promulgated by Pope Alexander VII in 1656 which judged the meaning and intention of Cornelius Jansen's words in Augustinus, and confirmed and renewed the condemnation in Cum occasione promulgated by Pope Innocent X in 1653 that five propositions found in Augustinus were heretical.

That same year, 1656, sixty Jansenist doctors, including Antoine Arnauld, were degraded from the College of Sorbonne faculty of theology. French bishops supported Alexander VII.

Michael O'Riordan wrote, in Catholic Encyclopedia, that since some still insisted that those propositions were not to be found in Augustinus, or were not meant by Jansen in the sense in which they were condemned, Ad sanctam beati Petri sedem furthermore declared that they are contained in Augustinus, and have been condemned according to the sense of the author.

Alexander VII continued this condemnation in Regiminis Apostolici, promulgated in 1665 which required, according to the Enchiridion symbolorum, "all ecclesiastical personnel and teachers" to subscribe to an included formulary, the Formula of Submission for the Jansenists, by rejecting and condemning the five propositions contained in Augustinus.

Jansenism was condemned as heretical, by the Catholic Church, in at least five documents: Cum occasione, Ad sanctam beati Petri sedem, Regiminis Apostolici, Vineam Domini Sabaoth, and Unigenitus.

== See also ==
- Formulary controversy
- Jansenism
