= Servaas de Quinckere =

Bishop of Leeuwarden (1519–1594)

- Bishop of Bruges
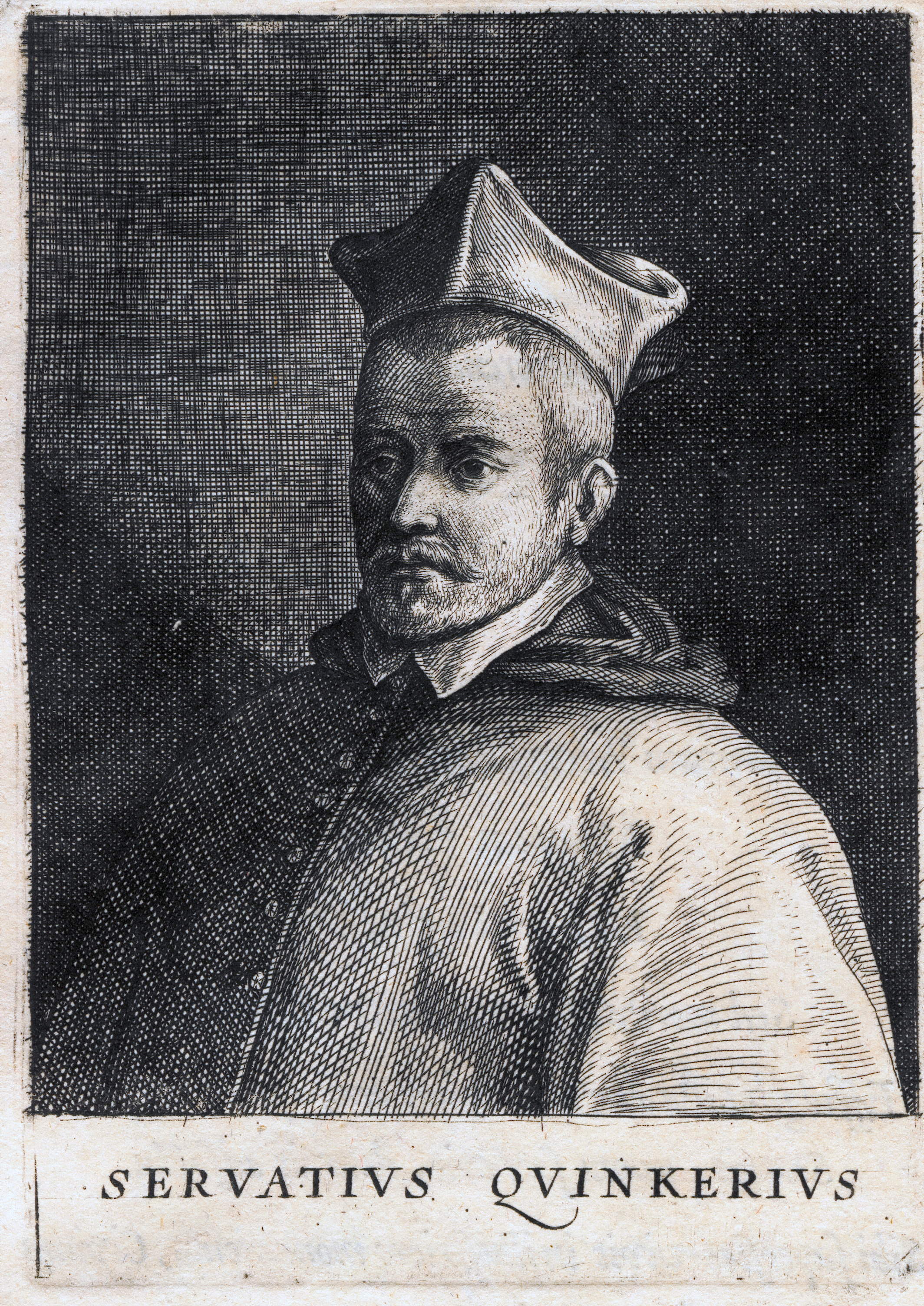
- Engraved portrait from Antonius Sanderus, Flandria Illustrata, 1641-1644.
- Province: Mechelen
- Diocese: Bruges
- See: St. Donatian's Cathedral
- Installed: 1630
- Term ended: 1639
- Predecessor: Denis Stoffels
- Successor: Nicolaas de Haudion

Orders
- Consecration: 16 June 1630

Personal details
- Born: 6 April 1569 Bruges, County of Flanders, Habsburg Netherlands
- Died: 12 May 1594 (aged 25) Bruges, County of Flanders, Habsburg Netherlands
- Denomination: Catholic Church
- Education: Leuven University

Servaas de Quinckere (1569–1639), Latinized Servatius Quinkerius, was the seventh bishop of Bruges in the Habsburg Netherlands (now Belgium).

== Life ==
De Quinckere, the son of a simple woodworker, was able to pursue higher studies partly through the support of his parish priest. He was ordained to the priesthood in Leuven on 17 April 1593, and on 25 September 1596 was appointed to a canonry in the chapter of St. Donatian's Cathedral. He served as canon penitentiary (1596–1598), rural dean of Damme (1596–1609), archpriest of Bruges (1598–1622), and dean of Oudenburg (1607–1609). He was also involved in the refounding of a seminary for the training of priests in 1611, and provided lectures in theology there (1618–1622). In 1622 he became dean of the cathedral chapter.

He was consecrated as bishop on 16 June 1630, at the age of 61. Although determined to reform the diocese, he was high-handed and scandal-prone, and had difficult relations with his own cathedral chapter. On 22 January 1632 he closed the seminary, sending home the eight scholarship students, the president, and the service staff. On 22 March 1632 he sacked the entire staff of the diocesan court, in order to end corruption in the collection of fines and fees. At the same time, the papal nuncio, Richard Pauli-Stravius, received several reports that De Quinckere was in an inappropriate relationship with his housekeeper. De Quinckere died on 3 March 1639.
