= Formulary controversy =

17/18th-century European religious controversy

The formulary controversy was a 17th- and 18th-century Jansenist refusal to confirm the Formula of Submission for the Jansenists on the part of a group of Catholic ecclesiastical personnel and teachers who did not accept the charge that their beliefs about the nature of man and grace were heretical as the Holy See declared. In the Kingdom of France, it pitted Jansenists against Jesuits. It gave rise to French theologian Blaise Pascal's Lettres provinciales, the condemnation of casuistry by the Holy See, and the dissolution of organised Jansenism.

== Context ==
During the Council of Trent (1545–1563), the Roman Catholic Church reaffirmed, against Protestantism, both the reality of human liberum arbitrium (free will, i.e. "non-necessary" character of human will (Note: "Necessary" here means "that which can be no other", so lack of necessity implies the possibility of something other occurring. It could possibly be explained both in compatibilistic and in libertarian terms.)) and the necessity of divine grace. Catholicism was then divided into two main interpretations, Augustinism and Thomism, which both agreed on predestination and on efficacious grace (or irresistible grace), which meant that, while Divine will infallibly comes to pass, grace and free will were not incompatible. Augustinism was rather predominant, in particular in the University of Leuven, where a rigid form of Augustinism, Baianism, was articulated by Michael Baius. Baius' propositions on the nature of man and grace were condemned, in the papal bull Ex omnibus afflictionibus promulgated by Pope Pius V in 1567, as heretical. According to Joseph Sollier, in the Catholic Encyclopedia, Baius' concept of the primitive state of man was Pelagian; his presentation of the downfall was Calvinist; and his theory of redemption was more than Lutheran and close to Socinian.

Following the Council of Trent, two rival theories emerged in the Church. Under the influence of the ideas of the Renaissance, the newly founded Society of Jesus asserted the role of free will, with authors such as George de Montemajor, Gregory of Valentia, Leonardus Lessius and Johannes Hamelius.

The Jesuit Luis Molina published De liberi arbitrii cum gratiae donis, divina praescientia, praedestinatione et reprobatione concordia in 1588, which asserted that God offers his grace to all people, and that it was by an act of free will that each one accepted it or rejected it. Molina's theology of sufficient grace became popular, but the lack of differentiation between sufficient and efficacious grace (along with the assertion of counterfactual definiteness) was opposed by large sectors of the Church who considered it incompatible with God's sovereignty or goodness, being of central importance in the Congregatio de Auxiliis.

In opposition, the Jansenists claimed to espouse Augustinism, which insisted on a separate determining efficacious grace. The Jesuits accepted Augustine's assertion of the necessity of grace, but rejected the notion that there was any substantial difference between sufficient and efficacious grace (both determine man's behaviour to an extent).

A similar controversy arose between the Dominicans and Jesuits, which led Pope Clement VIII to establish the Congregatio de Auxiliis (1597–1607) in order to settle the debate. Although the issue seemed unfavorable to Molinism, the issue finally was suspended rather than solved. Pope Paul V, in a 1611 Holy Office decree, prohibited publication without prior examination by the Inquisition of all works, including commentaries, about the aid of grace. Pope Urban VIII, in a 1625 Holy Office decree and a 1640 Holy Office decree, confirmed Paul V's decree and warned about censures such as withdrawal of teaching and preaching faculties as well as excommunication.

== Theological debate ==
In 1628, Cornelius Jansen, a professor at Leuven, began writing Augustinus, a three volume treatise on Augustine of Hippo, which conflated Jesuits with Pelagianism by highlighting Augustine's propositions. Augustinus was published posthumously, in 1640 at Leuven, in 1641 at Paris, and in 1642 at Rouen. Augustinus reignited the debate appeased by the Congregatio de Auxiliis.

In France, Cardinal Armand Jean du Plessis de Richelieu strongly opposed Jansen, in part because Jansen wrote a pamphlet, Mars gallicus (1635), against Richelieu's anti-Habsburg policy and alliances with German states. Richelieu therefore charged Isaac Habert, the theologian of Notre-Dame, to preach against Pelagius. Richelieu nominated Alphonse Le Moyne as a professor to the College of Sorbonne in order to refute Augustinus.

Many Sorbonne theologians opposed Richelieu, as they mostly followed Augustinism's insistence on efficacious grace. But the Jansenists of the convent of Port-Royal were Le Moyne's and Habert's main opponents. In 1638, Richelieu had its leader, Jean du Vergier de Hauranne, incarcerated in Vincennes. Vergier de Hauranne was a friend of Jansen. His incarceration gave him further influence as a martyr.

After Richelieu's death in 1642, Jansenists replied to the attacks against Jansen, first in Sanctus Augustinus per seipsum docens Catholicos, et vincens Pelagianos, attributed to the Oratorian Colin du Juanet and sometimes to Antoine Arnauld, and then, in 1644–45, by two Apologies pour M. Jansénius (Apologies for Jansenius) by Antoine Arnauld, which enjoyed great success.

Finally, at the request of the Apostolic Nuncio to Brussels, Georg Pauli-Stravius, and the Apostolic Nuncio to Cologne, Fabio Chigi, Urban VIII prohibited Augustinus in In eminenti ecclesiae in 1642, because Augustinus was "published in opposition" to "condemnations and prohibitions" in decrees of Paul V and Urban VIII, was expressed "with contempt toward the authority of the" Holy See, and contained previously condemned propositions.

Pope Innocent X, in a 1647 Holy Office decree, condemned the proposition, found in Jansenist Martin de Barcos's preface to Antoine Arnauld's 1644 De la fréquente communion, that Peter the Apostle and Paul the Apostle "are two supreme pastors and governors of the Church who constitute a single head" and they "are two princes of the Church who amount to one", when the proposition is interpreted "to imply a complete equality between" Peter and Paul "without the subordination and subjection" of Paul to Peter in "power and governance".

In opposition to Jansenism, a group of theological doctors from the Sorbonne extracted eight propositions from Augustinus. (Note: Later reduced to five propositions in 1649.) These propositions concerned the relation between nature and grace. They accused Jansen of having misinterpreted Augustine, conflating Jansenists with Lutherans – in the frame of a highly conflictual context, which had led to the French Wars of Religion, officially ended with the 1598 Edict of Nantes.

On 31 May 1653, Innocent X promulgated the apostolic constitution Cum occasione, which condemned five propositions found in Augustinus as heretical. In 1654, Arnauld replied to Cum occasione by making a distinction between de jure and de facto: de jure, the heretical propositions could be condemned, and he accepted this sentence; but de facto, they could not be found in Jansen's treaty.

The Sorbonne then attempted to exclude Arnauld from being a theologian. Arnauld was forced underground, while in January 1654 an almanac attributed to the Jesuits grossly presented the Jansenists as under-cover Calvinists. Arnauld's nephew, Louis-Isaac Lemaître de Sacy, a translator of the Bible de Port-Royal, wrote Enluminures, a poem, in reply to this attack.

Pascal, under the pseudonym Louis de Montalte, wrote Lettres provinciales in 1657, in defense of Arnauld, in which he harshly attacked Jesuits and their morality, in particular casuistry. Following publication of Lettres provinciales, the King sent spies everywhere, condemned the librarians who had clandestinely published Lettres provinciales and discovered the author of Lettres provinciales. The theological debate had turned into a political affair.

On 16 October 1656, Alexander VII promulgated the apostolic constitution Ad sanctam beati Petri sedem, which judged the meaning and intention of Jansen's words in Augustinus, and confirmed and renewed the condemnation in Cum occasione.

The Jesuits enjoyed predominant political and theological power. Their members included two personal confessors to the King of France, François Annat and, before him, Nicolas Caussin.

Cardinal Jules Mazarin strongly opposed Jansenists, both in Europe and abroad (with the Jesuit Reductions and the Jesuit China missions). Mazarin persuaded the pope to compel Jansenists to sign a formulary, to assent to Ad sanctam beati Petri sedem, and to confess their faults. The Assembly of the French Clergy afterwards decided to compel all priests to sign an anti-Jansenist formulary, in which each one accepted the papal condemnation.

One of Pascal's last works was Ecrit sur la signature du Formulaire (1661), in which he adamantly opposed subscribing to a formulary and radicalized Arnauld's position: Pascal equivocated that condemning Jansen was equivalent to condemning Augustine, a father of the Church.

The Jansenists of Port-Royal, who included members of the Arnauld family – such as Abbess Marie Angelique Arnauld, Antoine Arnauld, Agnès Arnauld – and Pierre Nicole, were forced to subscribe to the Formula of Submission for the Jansenists. Although ostensibly submitting to Papal authority, they added that the condemnation would only be effective if the five propositions were in fact found in Augustinus, and claimed that they did not figure there.

Jansenists reasoned that Innocent X and Alexander VII had the power to condemn heretical propositions, but not to make what did not figure in Augustinus be there. This strategy would impose decades of theological disputes and debate, thus allowing them to gain time.

Lettres provinciales stimulated several responses from the Jesuits, including in 1657 the publication of the anonymous Apologie pour les Casuistes contre les calomnies des Jansénistes, written by Father Georges Perot. (Note: Apologie pour les Casuistes contre les calomnies des Jansénistes was added to the Index Librorum Prohibitorum by Alexander VII in 1659.) It rather unfortunately claimed as its own Pascal's interpretations of the Casuists' propositions, in particular concerning controversial propositions about homicides. This led the friars of Paris to condemn Jesuit casuistry.

On 15 February 1665, Alexander VII promulgated the apostolic constitution Regiminis Apostolici, which required, according to the Enchiridion symbolorum, "all ecclesiastical personnel and teachers" to subscribe to an included formulary, the Formula of Submission for the Jansenists – assenting to both Cum occasione and Ad sanctam beati Petri sedem.

From then on, Jansenists of Port-Royal ceased publishing Lettres provinciales, and, along with Pascal, started collaborating with the Ecrits des curés (Friars' Writings) which condemned casuistry. Two further decrees, of 24 September 1665 and 18 March 1666, condemned the Casuists' "laxist morality". Pope Innocent XI issued a second condemnation in a 2 March 1679 decree. In total, the Vatican had condemned 110 propositions issued by Casuists, 57 of which had been treated in Lettres provinciales. The books added to the Index Librorum Prohibitorum in Rome were, however, published in France. Jesuits had beforehand bypassed the Holy See's censorship by publishing controversial books there.

On 16 July 1705, Pope Clement XI promulgated the apostolic constitution Vineam Domini Sabaoth, which declared that "obediential silence" is not a satisfactory response to the Formula of Submission for the Jansenists.

Pascal and some other Jansenists claimed that condemning Jansen was equivalent to condemning Augustine, and adamantly refused assent to the Formula of Submission for the Jansenists, with or without a mental reservation. This in turn led to the further radicalization of the King and of the Jesuits, and in 1661 the Convent of Port-Royal was closed and the Jansenist community dissolved – it would be ultimately razed in 1710 on orders of Louis XIV. The controversy not only involved papal authority, but rather papal authority concerning the interpretation of texts – something Pascal recalled by quoting the Jesuit Cardinal Robert Bellarmine's sentences concerning the authority of religious councils concerning matters of dogma versus de facto issues.

== See also ==
- Compatibilism and incompatibilism
- Congregatio de Auxiliis (a similar debate between the Jesuits and the Dominicans)
- Unigenitus Dei Filius – an apostolic constitution promulgated by Pope Clement XI in 1713 which condemned 101 Jansenist propositions of Pasquier Quesnel as heretical
- Ex omnibus christiani orbis – an encyclical promulgated by Pope Benedict XIV
