= Denis Stoffels =

Dionisius Christofori
- Bishop of Bruges
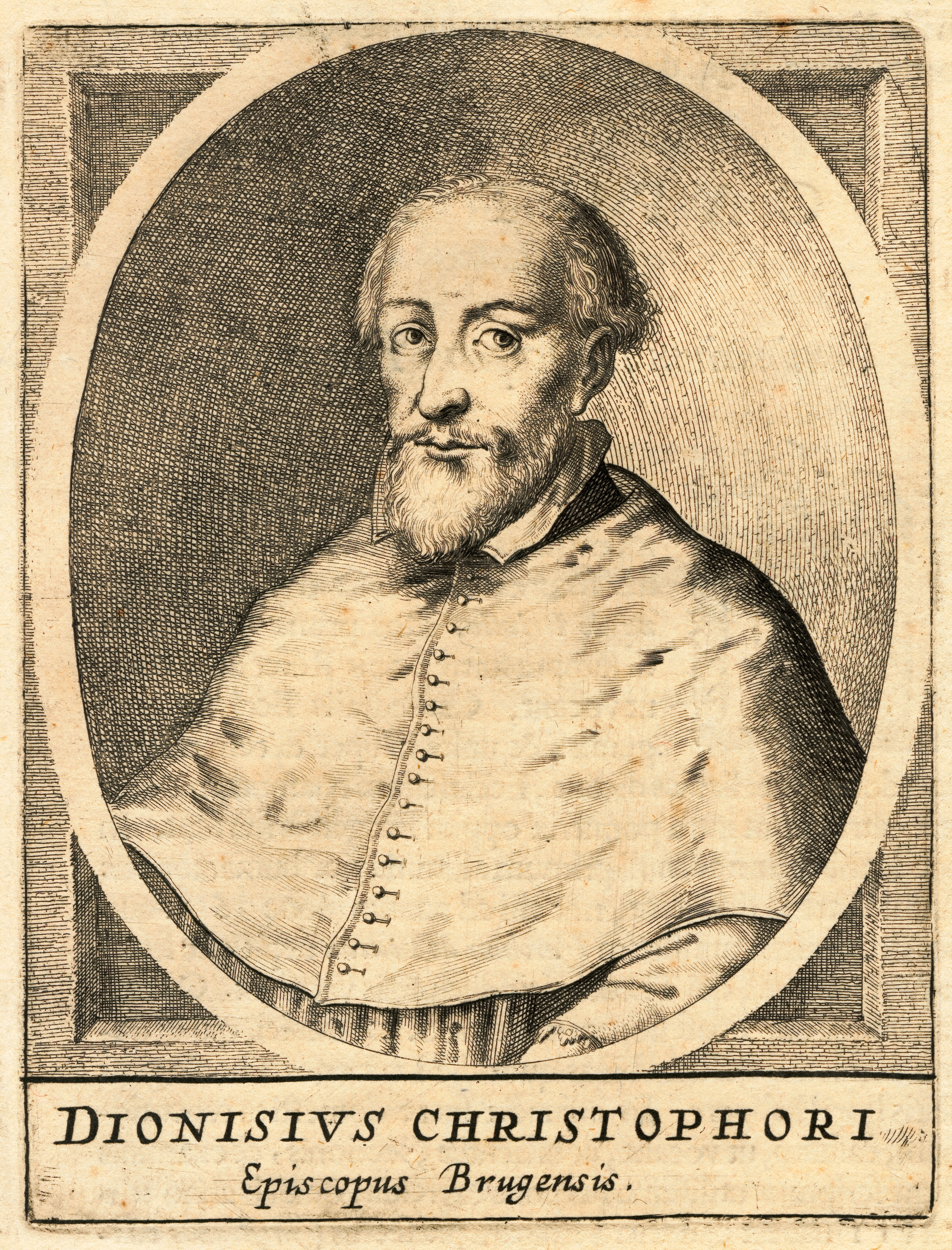
- Native name: Denis Stoffels
- Province: Mechelen
- Diocese: Bruges
- See: St. Donatian's Cathedral
- Predecessor: Anthonius Triest
- Successor: Servaas de Quinckere

Orders
- Consecration: 25 May 1623 by Jacobus Boonen

Personal details
- Born: c. 1570 Antwerp, Duchy of Brabant, Habsburg Netherlands
- Died: 6 August 1629 Bruges, County of Flanders, Habsburg Netherlands
- Denomination: Catholic Church
- Education: Leuven University
- Motto: Vincit qui patitur

Denis Stoffels or Dionisius Christofori (c. 1570–1629) was a bishop of Bruges in the Habsburg Netherlands.

== Life ==
Stoffels was born in Antwerp around 1570 and studied at Leuven University, graduating Licentiate in Sacred Theology. He briefly served as plebanus of the collegiate chapter of St Peter's Church in Turnhout, resigning to travel to Rome for the Holy Year in 1600. In Rome he served as chaplain and secretary to Cardinal Bellarmine, departing on 20 April 1604 to return to the Low Countries to take up a canonry of the cathedral chapter in Bruges. In 1607 he became scholaster of Bruges Cathedral, and in 1611 president and professor of the diocesan seminary, newly refounded by Charles Philippe de Rodoan. In 1617 he became dean of Bruges Cathedral, in that capacity serving as a representative of the first estate in the States of Flanders.

In 1622 Anthonius Triest was transferred to the see of Ghent, and Stoffels was nominated to succeed him as bishop of Bruges. He was consecrated on 25 May 1623, and died in Bruges on 6 August 1629. He was buried in the cathedral, at the foot of the main altar.

Catholic Church titles
Preceded by Anthonius Triest	Bishop of Bruges; 1623–1629	Succeeded by Servaas de Quinckere
