= Jacobus Zegers =

Academic printer and bookseller

- Died: 1644; Leuven
- Occupation(s): printer and bookseller
- Years active: 1631–1644
- Era: handpress
- Organization: University of Leuven
- Known for: printing Cornelius Jansen's Augustinus (1640)
- Spouse(s): (1) Catherine Caverenne (2) Paschase De Zangere (daughter of Petrus Zangrius)

Jacobus Zegers (died 14 January 1644) was an academic printer and bookseller in Leuven, with many clients among the faculty of Leuven University. He was the printer of Cornelius Jansen's Augustinus (1640).

== Life ==
Zegers settled in Leuven around 1631, married twice, and had a thriving business as an academic publisher and bookseller. His clients included Nicolaus Vernulaeus and Diodorus Tuldenus.

Having printed Cornelius Jansen's massive three-volume Augustinus in 1640, the papal condemnation of the work and the ensuing controversies drove Zegers to the brink of bankruptcy and led to his untimely death. His widow continued the bookshop, with the support of Jansenist patrons.

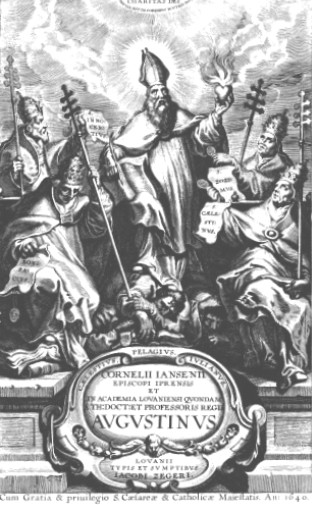
Jansen's Augustinus, the book that put Zegers out of business

== Publications ==
- 1631: Cornelius Jansen, Notarum spongia
- 1635: anonymous (Cornelius Jansen) Mars Gallicus
- 1639: Cornelius Jansen, Tetrateuchus, sive Commentarius in sancta Iesu Christi evangelia
- 1640: Nicolaus Vernulaeus, Virtutum augustissimae gentis austriacae. Libri tres
- 1640: Cornelius Jansen, Augustinus
- 1641: Cornelius Jansen, Pentateuchus: sive commentarius in quinque libros Moysis
- 1641: Nicolaus Vernulaeus, Laudatio funebris principi Ferdinando

== Studies ==
- L. Ceyssens, "Jacobus Zegers, drukker te Leuven", Eigen Schoon en De Brabander 45 (1964): 204-216.
