= Richard Pauli-Stravius =

Roman Catholic prelate

Most Reverend Richard Pauli-Stravius
- Auxiliary Bishop of Liège; Titular Bishop of Dionysias
- Church: Catholic Church
- Diocese: Diocese of Liège
- In office: 1642–1654
- Previous post: Apostolic Internuncio to Flanders (1634–1642)

Orders
- Ordination: 1631
- Consecration: 2 February 1642 by Jacobus Boonen

Personal details
- Born: 1584/90 Kuttekoven, Prince-Bishopric of Liège, Holy Roman Empire
- Died: 24 January 1654 Liège, Prince-Bishopric of Liège, Holy Roman Empire

Richard Pauli-Stravius (1584/90–1654) was a Roman Catholic prelate who served as a papal diplomat (1634–1642) and as Auxiliary Bishop to Ferdinand of Bavaria for the Diocese of Liège (1642–1654) with a titular appointment as bishop of Dionysias.

== Biography ==
Pauli-Stravius was born at Kuttekoven in the Prince-Bishopric of Liège (now Belgium), the son of Laurent Pauwels and Anna Strauven. His date of birth has been given as around 1584 and around 1590. From around 1604 he and his brother, Georges Pauli-Stravius, studied in Rome together, where he graduated doctor of both laws in 1611 and became protonotary apostolic. While in papal service in Rome he acquired a number of absentee appointments in the Prince-Bishopric of Liège, with a canonry in Tongeren from 1606 and a benefice in Borgloon from 1616. In 1618 he was appointed secretary to the Congregation of Bishops and Regulars.

Pauli-Stravius returned to the Low Countries in 1624, resigning his canonry in Tongeren to take up a position as archdeacon of Arras Cathedral, becoming vicar general to Bishop Paul Boudot. Richard was ordained a priest in Liège in 1631.

In 1634, he was appointed Apostolic Internuncio to Flanders, the pope's interim diplomatic agent at the Brussels court in expectation of the arrival of Lelio Falconieri as nuncio. Falconieri in the event never presented his credentials, and in 1637 his appointment was rescinded, so Pauli-Stravius continued to act as the papal diplomat on the spot until after Cardinal-Infante Ferdinand of Austria's death in November 1641, when the Brussels nunciature was wound down. In 1637 he became a canon of Cambrai Cathedral, and in 1638 archdeacon of Cambrai.

Ferdinand III, Holy Roman Emperor, ennobled Pauli-Stravius and his family on 18 May 1640. In 1641, both Richard and his brother Georges were nominated as auxiliary bishops to Ferdinand of Bavaria, who while ruling as prince-bishop of Liège and archbishop-elector of Cologne had not himself received episcopal ordination. On 2 February 1642, Stravius was consecrated bishop of Dionysias by Jacobus Boonen, Archbishop of Mechelen, with Anthonius Triest, Bishop of Ghent, and Gaspard Nemius, Bishop of Antwerp, as co-consecrators. In 1649 he negotiated a reconciliation between Ferdinand and the city of Liège at Huy. He served as auxiliary bishop of Liège until his death on 24 January 1654, and was buried in the Ursuline church in Liège. He left a reputation for argumentativeness and venality.
