= Michael Seewald =

German Catholic priest, theologian, and author (born 1987)

The Reverend Michael Seewald
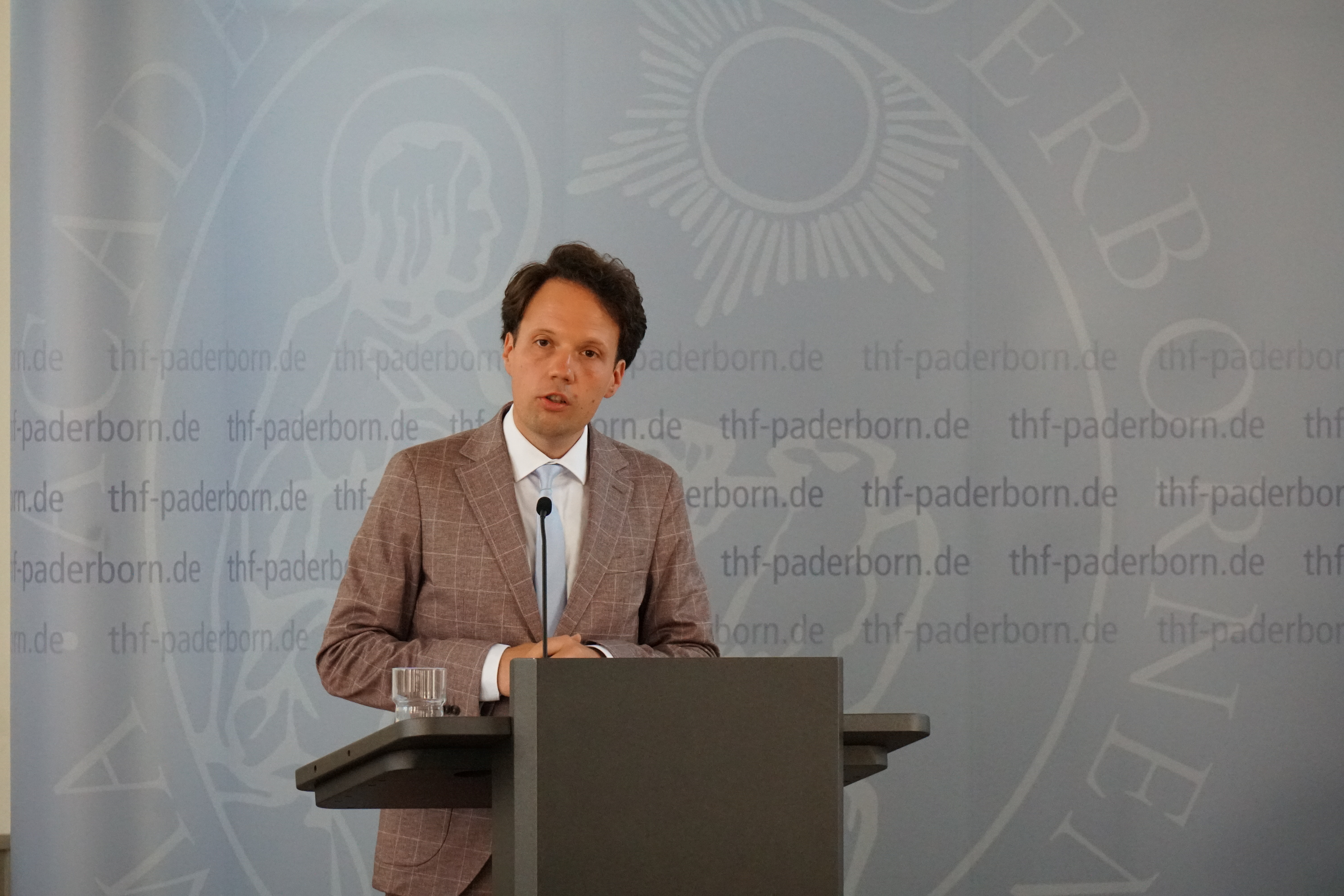
- Born: 13 July 1987; Saarbrücken, Germany
- Citizenship: German/French
- Education: LMU Munich; University of Münster; University of Tübingen
- Occupations: Catholic priest; Professor of theology; Writer
- Website: https://www.kaththeol.lmu.de/de/personen/kontaktseite/michael-seewald-e457c39c.html

Michael Seewald (born 13 July 1987) is a German Catholic priest, theologian, and author. Seewald holds the chair in Dogmatics and History of Dogma at the Faculty of Catholic Theology at LMU Munich. Since 2025, he is the editor of the Denziger compendium.

From 2017 to 2026, he was a professor at the University of Münster. At the age of 29, he was the youngest professor in theology in Germany. His studies focus on the historical development of Catholic Church's doctrine and governance, with special reference to the evolution of dogma.

In 2024, he was awarded of the Gottfried Wilhelm Leibniz Prize.

== Publications ==
- "The Death Penalty, Church Teaching and the Development of Dogma: Reflections on Pope Francis' Change to the Catechism," Concilium – International Journal of Theology, 129–143, 2019
- Catholic Perspectives on Reform, New York: Paulist Press, 2022
- Theories of Doctrinal Development in the Catholic Church, Cambridge: Cambridge University Press, 2023
