= Acquoy =

- Village
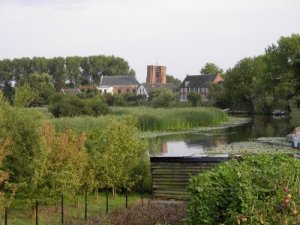
- Panorama of Acquoy

- Coat of arms

- Location in the province of Gelderland in the Netherlands Acquoy (Netherlands)
- Coordinates: 51°52′44″N 5°8′9″E
- Country: Netherlands
- Province: Gelderland
- Municipality: West Betuwe

Area
  - Total: 7.72 km^{2} (2.98 sq mi)
- Elevation: 3.2 m (10 ft)

Population (2021)
  - Total: 580
  - Density: 75/km^{2} (190/sq mi)
- Time zone: UTC+1 (CET)
  - Summer (DST): UTC+2 (CEST)
- Postal code: 4151
- Dialing code: 0345

Acquoy (Dutch pronunciation: [ˈɑkoːi]) is a village in the Dutch province of Gelderland. It is a part of the municipality of West Betuwe, and lies about 12 km (7 mi) east of Gorinchem.

According to popular legend a "Jan van Arkel" was the first to have settled the village of Acquoy, when he returned from the crusades in 1133. However, this is highly unlikely, because there were no crusades in the period around 1133. The first crusade was from 1096–99 and the second one was from 1147-49. Some sources report that the Jan van Arkel mentioned was in fact Jan I van Arkel. However, he lived a century later and had the nickname "de Sterke", which means "the strong".

In 1305 Acquoy is mentioned as part of the property of the lords of Voorne. In 1364 Catherina van Voornenburgh rented her house together with the stronghold of Acquoy to Otto van Arkel for a period of 10 years and later he bought it. From that moment on, Acquoy, like Arkel itself and Gellicum, belonged to the Lordship of Arkel. After Acquoy changed hands several times, it was bought by Floris van Egmond, Count of Buren, in 1513.

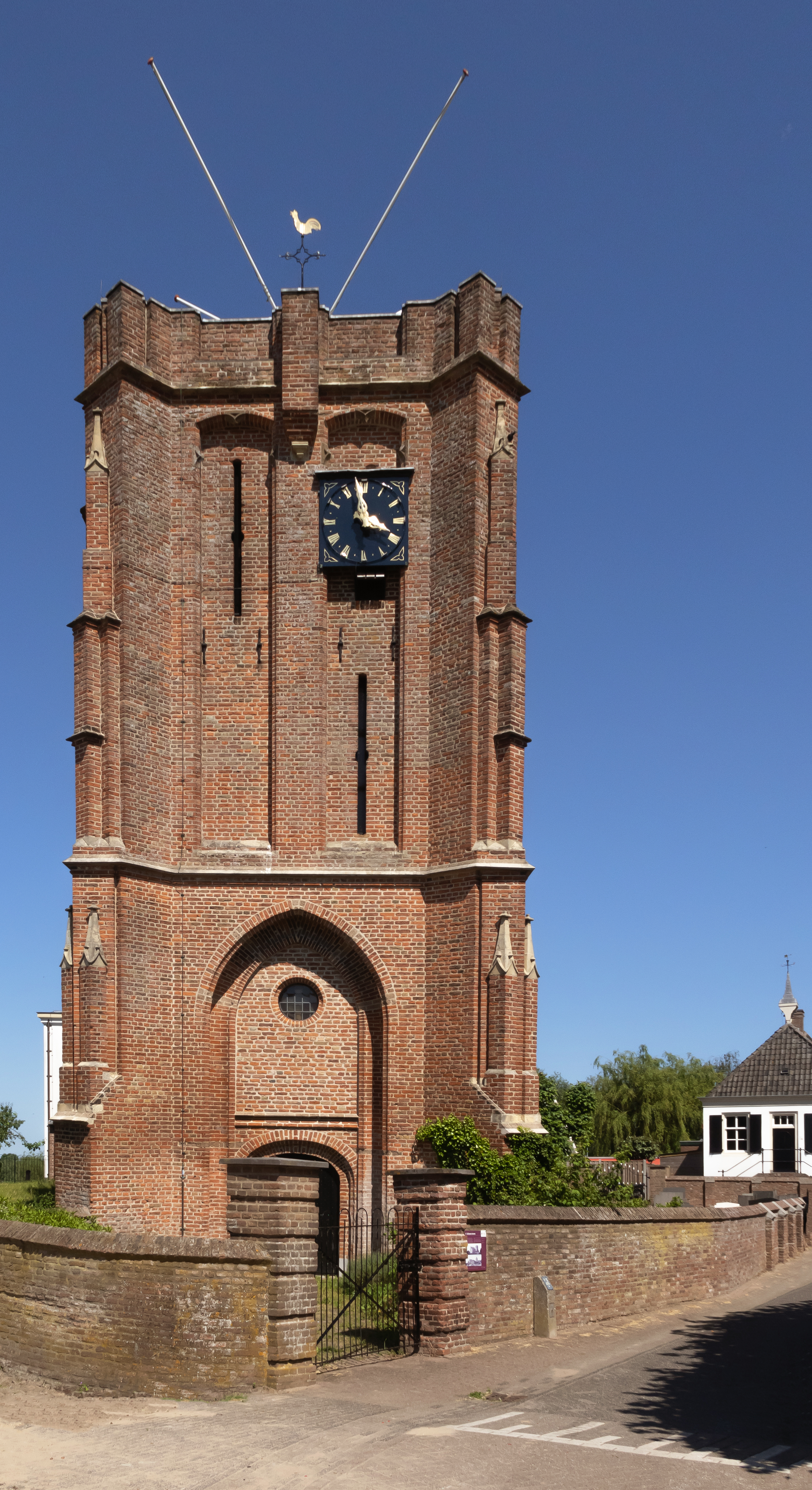
Tower of the reformed church

Through the marriage of Willem of Orange with the granddaughter of Floris van Egmond, Anna van Egmond in 1551, Acquoy, together with Leerdam, became property of the House of Orange and part of the County of Holland. The shire of Acquoy was made a barony in that time. Acquoy remained property of the House of Orange until 1795, when it became part of Holland, together with Leerdam. At this time the title of Baron of Acquoy disappeared. However, this did happen without protest of the local population. In 1820 it became part of the province Gelderland, because it became part of the municipality of Beesd. The shield of the Barony of Acquoy can nowadays still be viewed in the Nieuwe Kerk in Amsterdam.

Acquoy is located at the old turn of the river the Linge, which was diverted, so it nowadays lies at a dead-end U-formed side arm of the river. The village got its typical long stretched form, parallel to the river, because people used to build their houses on, or directly behind, the Linge dike.

The name Acquoy is mentioned in scripts dating back to 1311, but there is some uncertainty where the name arises from. Some say that the name is from the Germanic *agaza, "magpie," and ooi, "low soggy land." "Ooi" is also found in other names; Wadenoijen, Poederoyen and Ammerzoden (= Ammerzoyen). According to the same theory the name "Rhenoy" is a combination of "Rhenus" (=Rijn, Rhine river) followed again by "ooi". Others point out that "Acquoy" is mentioned in old scripts as Eckoy or Echoy and this would mean that it was the lowland of lord Akko or Ekko. This was supposed to be a Friesian, but this is very uncertain.

Acquoy is famous as the birthplace of Cornelius Jansenius (Jansen), bishop of Ypres (Ieper), whose theological views brought forth the movement called Jansenism.

== Gallery ==
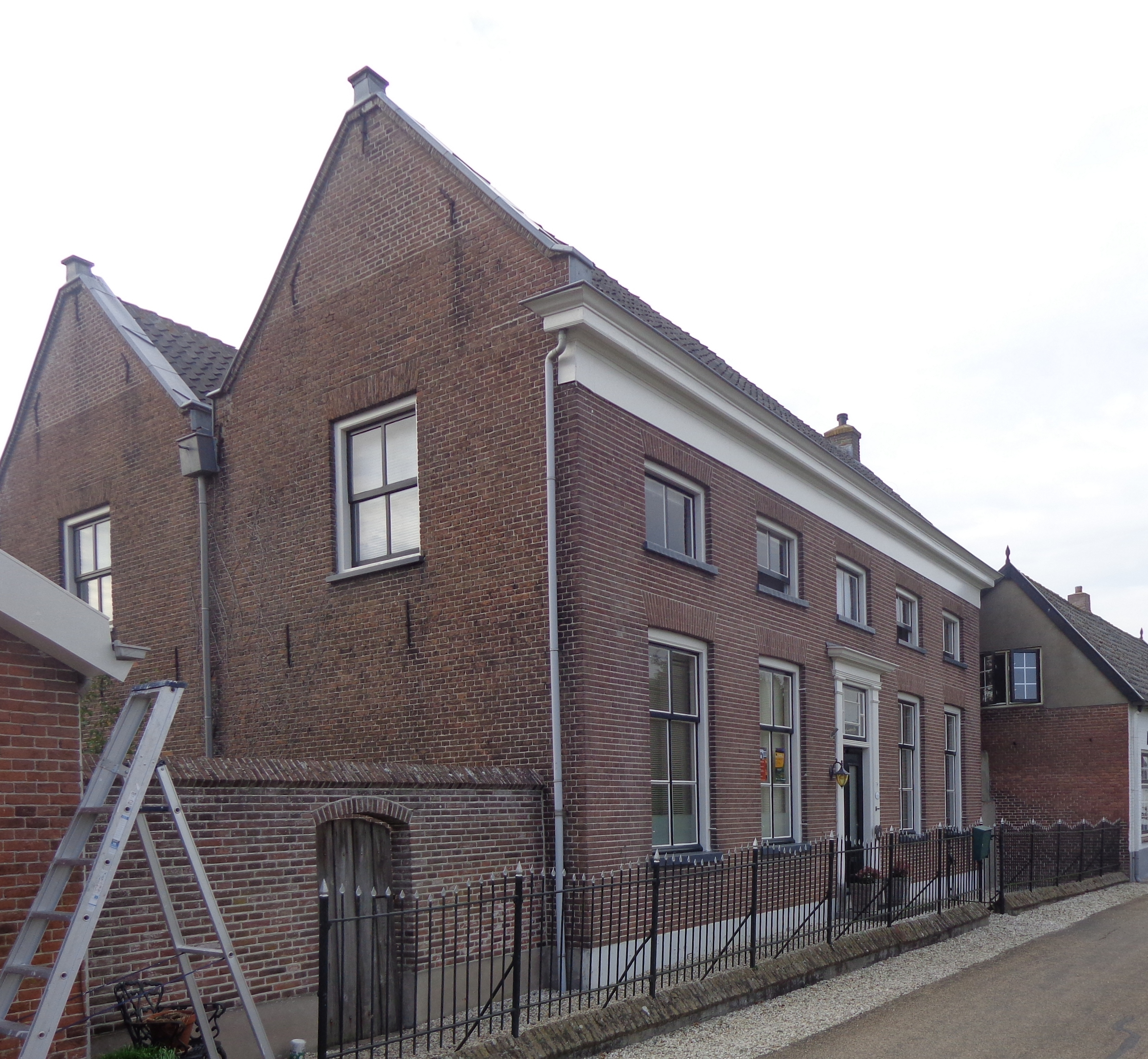
House in Acquoy

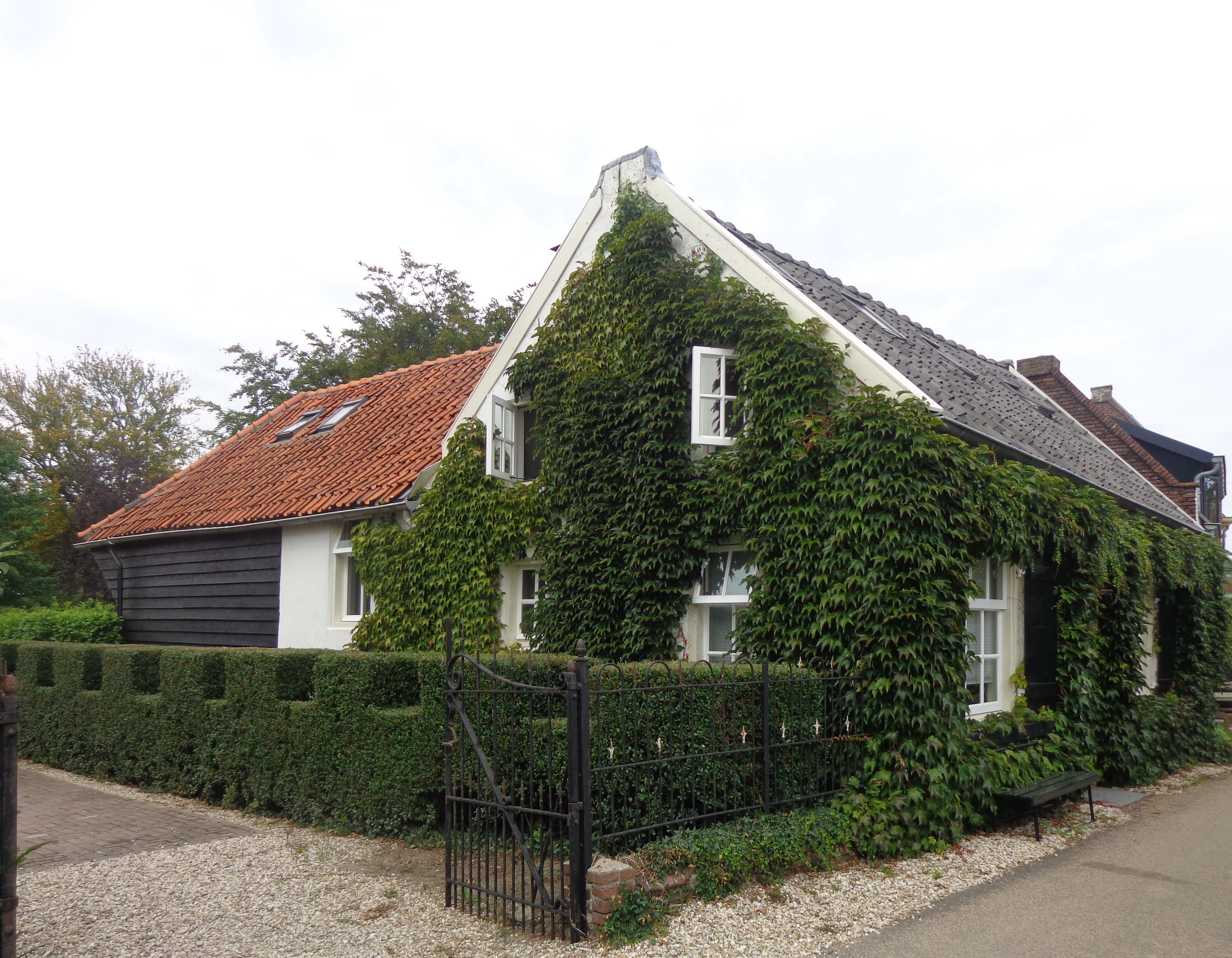
House in Acquoy

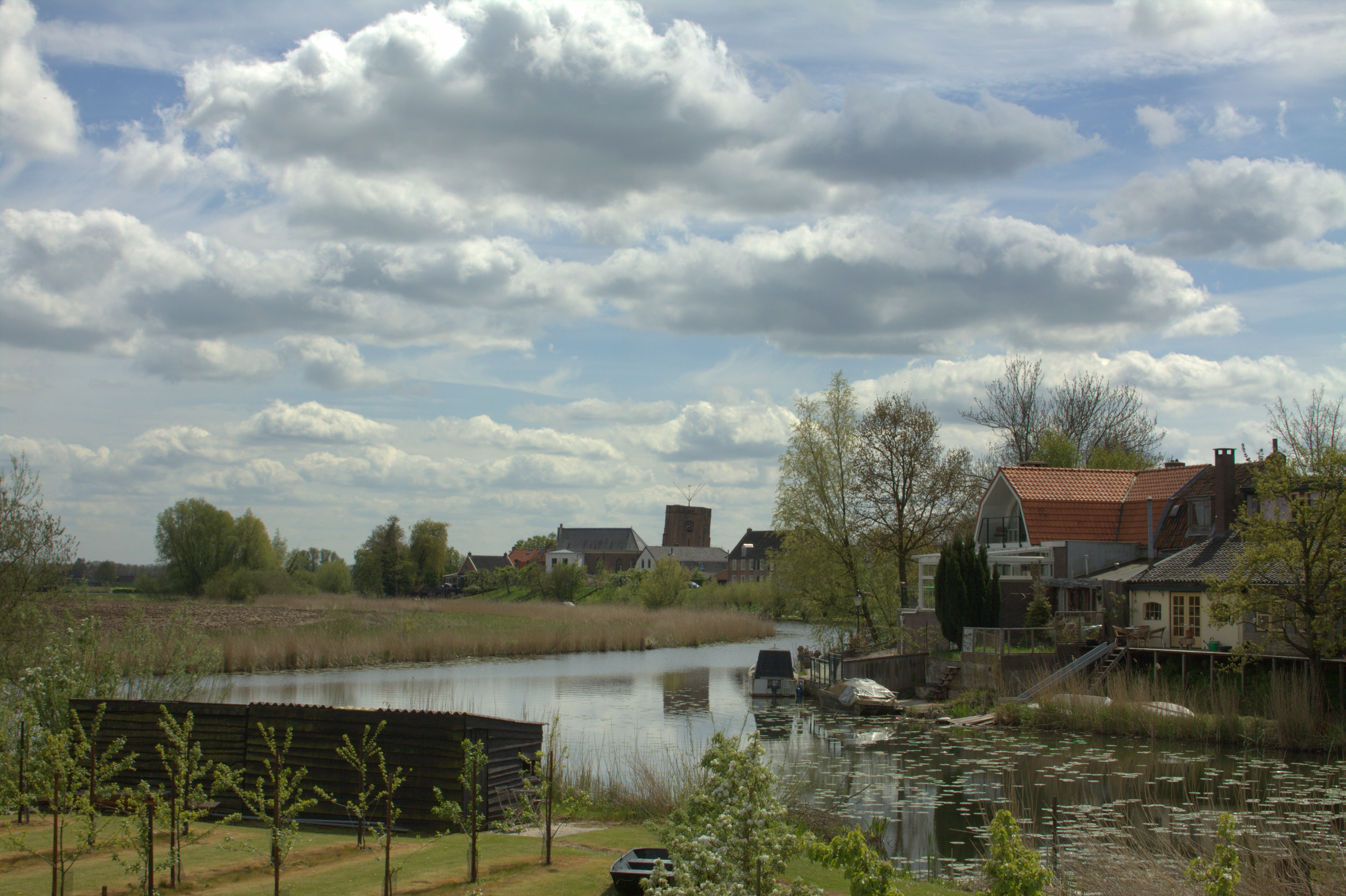
View from the Linge

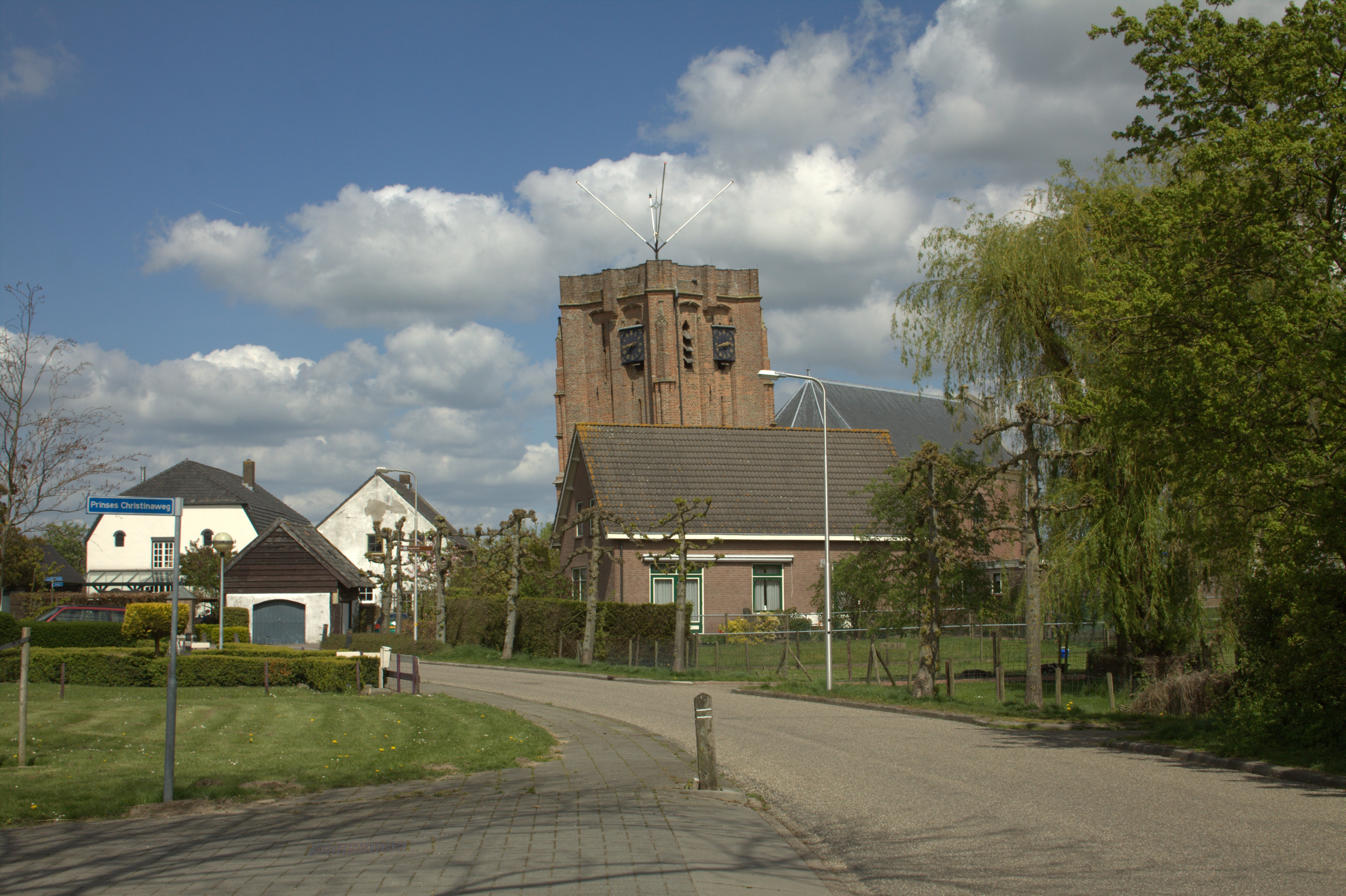
Acquoy from the south
