= Pope Alexander VII =

Head of the Catholic Church from 1655 to 1667

- Bishop of Rome
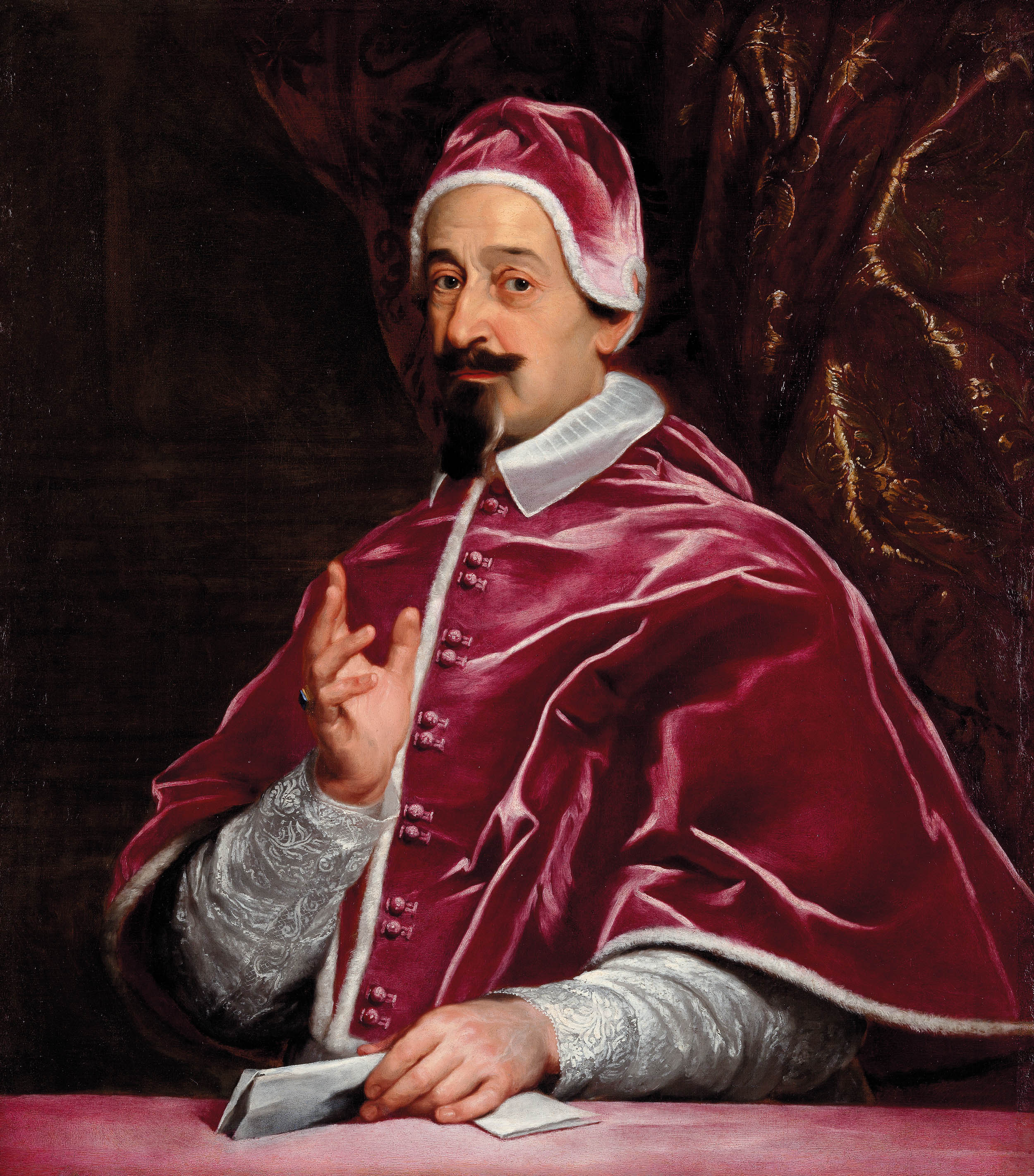
- Portrait by Giovanni Battista Gaulli
- Church: Catholic Church
- Papacy began: 7 April 1655
- Papacy ended: 22 May 1667
- Predecessor: Innocent X
- Successor: Clement IX
- Previous posts: Bishop of Nardò (1635–1652); Apostolic Nuncio to Germany (1639–1651); Cardinal Secretary of State (1651–1655); Cardinal-Priest of Santa Maria del Popolo (1652–1655); Archbishop of Imola (1653–1655)

Orders
- Ordination: December 1634
- Consecration: 1 July 1635 by Miguel Juan Balaguer Camarasa
- Created cardinal: 19 February 1652 by Innocent X

Personal details
- Born: Fabio Chigi; 13 February 1599 Siena, Grand Duchy of Tuscany
- Died: 22 May 1667 (aged 68) Rome, Papal States
- Motto: Montium custos (Latin for 'Mountain guardian')

- Coat of arms

Pope Alexander VII (Italian: Alessandro VII; 13 February 1599 – 22 May 1667), born Fabio Chigi, was head of the Catholic Church and ruler of the Papal States from 7 April 1655 to his death, in May 1667.

He began his career as a vice-papal legate, and he held various diplomatic positions in the Holy See. He was ordained as a priest in 1634, and he became bishop of Nardo in 1635. He was later transferred in 1652, and he became bishop of Imola. Pope Innocent X made him secretary of state in 1651 and, in 1652, he was appointed a cardinal.

Early in his papacy, Alexander lived simply and kept up the anti-nepotist position which he had held at the time of his election; later, however, his relatives received jobs in his administration and came to dominate it. His administration worked to support the Jesuits. However, his administration's relations with France were strained due to his frictions with French diplomats.

Alexander was interested in architecture and supported various urban projects in Rome. He also wrote poetry and patronized artists who expanded the decoration of churches. His theological writings included discussions of heliocentrism and the Immaculate Conception.

== Biography ==
=== Early life ===
Born in Siena, Fabio was the son of Count Flavio Chigi-Ardenghesca, Capitano del Popolo, and Laura Marsigli. He was privately tutored and eventually received doctorates of philosophy, law, and theology from the University of Siena.

=== Papal diplomat ===
In 1627, Fabio began his apprenticeship as vice-papal legate at Ferrara, and on recommendations from two cardinals he was appointed Inquisitor of Malta.

Fabio was ordained a priest in Rome in December 1634. He was appointed Referendarius utriusque signaturae, which made him a prelate and gave him the right to practice before the Roman courts. On 8 January 1635, he was named Bishop of Nardò in southern Italy and consecrated on 1 July 1635 by Miguel Juan Balaguer Camarasa, Bishop of Malta. On 13 May 1652, Fabio was transferred to the Bishopric of Imola.

Fabio was named nuncio in Cologne (1639–1651) on 11 June 1639. There, he supported Urban VIII's condemnation of the heretical book Augustinus by Cornelius Jansen, Bishop of Ypres, in the papal bull In eminenti of 1642.

Though expected to take part in the negotiations which led in 1648 to the Peace of Westphalia, Fabio (and other Catholic delegates) declined to deliberate with persons whom the Catholic Church considered heretics. Negotiations therefore took place in two cities, Osnabrück and Münster in Westphalia, with intermediaries travelling back and forth between the Protestant and the Catholic delegates. He protested against the Treaty of Westphalia on behalf of the Papacy once the instruments were finally completed. Pope Innocent X himself stated that the Peace "is null, void, invalid, unjust, damnable, reprobate, inane, empty of meaning and effect for all time." The Peace ended the Thirty Years' War (1618–1648) and established the balance of European power that lasted until the French Revolutionary Wars (1792).

== Secretary of State and Cardinal ==
Pope Innocent X (1644–1655) recalled Fabio to Rome and, in December 1651, named him Secretary of State. He was created a cardinal by Innocent X in the Consistory of 19 February 1652, and on 12 March was granted the title of Cardinal-Priest of Santa Maria del Popolo.

== Papacy ==
=== Election as pope ===
When Innocent X died on 7 January 1655, Fabio was elected pope after eighty days in the conclave, on 7 April 1655, taking the name of Alexander VII, in honor of Pope Alexander III.

On the morning of his election as he went to celebrate Mass before the final ballot, Chigi was greeted by his friend Luigi Omodei who, knowing that Chigi was soon to be elected, said: "At length that day has come, so desired by me, and so happy for the Church!" Chigi replied to Omodei by reciting Virgil and said: "That day I shall always recollect with grief; with reverence also for the gods so willed it". During the final ballot, Chigi had cast his vote for Giulio Cesare Sacchetti while in the accesso casting it for Giovanni Maria Battista Pallotta. Upon his election, one of the cardinals remarked: "What a singular thing! The Spaniards disinterestedly wished you to be pope; the French wished it, though they had at first excluded you; the young men chose a man already aged, and the Barberini a man who was not their own creature!"

Upon his election, he was crowned on 18 April 1655 by the Cardinal Protodeacon Gian Giacomo Teodoro Trivulzio before taking possession of the Archbasilica of Saint John Lateran on the following 9 May.

One of his first acts as pope was to order Olimpia Maidalchini (known popularly as "la papessa" due to her extraordinary influence over Pope Innocent X) to return to her native town of Orvieto. Maidalchini had been a rival of sorts since Chigi's office as Secretary of State commanded much power which Maidalchini hoped to utilize for her own ends while she worked with Cardinal Decio Azzolino to try to circumvent Chigi's authority with the hopes of having Chigi either effectively sidelined or replaced.

=== Nepotism ===
The conclave believed he was strongly opposed to the nepotism that had been a feature of previous popes. In the first year of his reign, Alexander lived simply and forbade his relatives even to visit Rome, but in the consistory of 24 April 1656, he announced that his brother and nephews would be moving to the capital to assist him. His nephew, Cardinal Flavio Chigi assumed the position of cardinal-nephew. The administration was given largely into the hands of his relatives, and nepotism became entrenched as it had been in the Baroque Papacy. Cardinal Flavio began work on the Villa Chigi-Versaglia at Formello in 1664.

When announcing to the cardinals in 1656 that he would summon his relatives to Rome, the pontiff asked that each cardinal provide his opinion on his suggestion. The cardinals agreed, but attached several conditions to ensure that nepotism did not run too rampant. The relatives were required to kneel for the entirety of their first audience, as the pope explained why they had been summoned and what was expected of them.

=== Urban and architectural projects in Rome ===
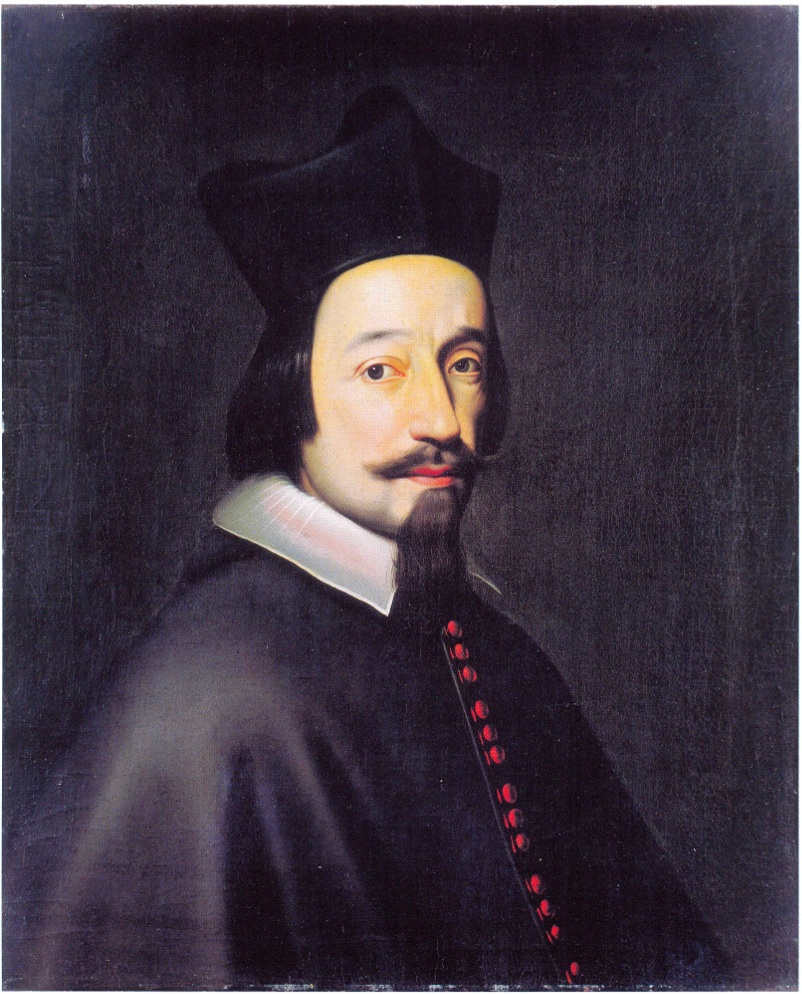
Fabio Chigi as Papal Nuntius to the Peace of Westphalia negotiations, by Anselm van Hulle (c. 1646)

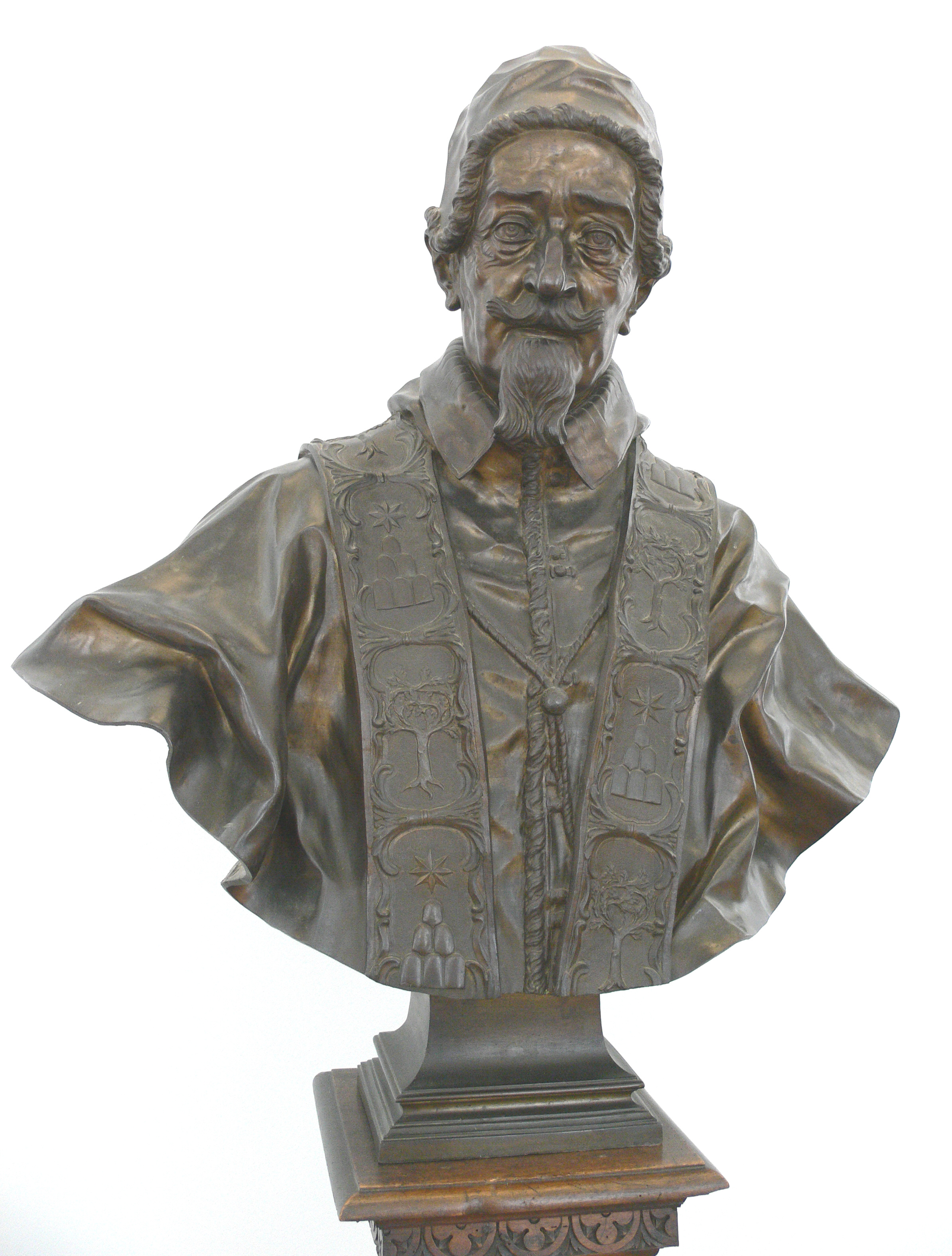
Alexander VII, by Domenico Guidi

A number of pontiffs are renowned for their urban planning in the city of Rome—for example, Pope Julius II and Pope Sixtus V—but Alexander VII's numerous urban interventions were not only diverse in scope and scale but demonstrated a consistent planning and architectural vision that the glorification and embellishment of the city, ancient and modern, sacred and secular, should be governed by order and decorum.

Central to Alexander's urbanism was the idea of teatro or urban theatre whereby his urban interventions became the grand settings or showpieces appropriate to the dignity of Rome and the Head of the Catholic Church. Therefore, and although the scales are vastly different, the small Santa Maria della Pace and its piazza are as much a teatro as the imposing monumental colonnade that forms St. Peter's Square in front of St. Peter's Basilica.

The various urban and architectural projects carried out during Alexander's reign were recorded in engravings by Giovanni Battista Falda and the first volume was published in 1665. The volumes were published by Giovanni Giacomo de Rossi under the title Il Nuovo Teatro delle fabriche et edificij in prospettiva di Roma moderna sotto il felice pontificato di N.S. Alessandro VII. A rival publication documenting these projects was published by Rossi's cousin Giovanni Battista de Rossi who employed the young Flemish architectural draughtsman Lieven Cruyl to produce drawings of Rome, 10 of which were published in 1666 under the title Prospectus Locorum Urbis Romae Insignium.

His preferred architect was the sculptor and architect Gian Lorenzo Bernini but he also gave architectural commissions to the painter and architect Pietro da Cortona. Of the three leading architects of the Roman High Baroque, only Francesco Borromini fared less well under Alexander; this may be because he thought Borromini's architectural forms wilful but also Borromini could be notoriously difficult. Nonetheless, Alexander's family heraldic emblems of the mons or mountains with stars and oak leaves, adorn Borromini's church of Sant'Ivo alla Sapienza and many other works of his reign.

Alexander took a keen personal interest in his urban and architectural projects and made notes of these in his diaries. His projects in Rome included: the church and piazza at Santa Maria della Pace; the Via del Corso, Piazza Colonna and associated buildings; reworking of the Porta del Popolo, the Piazza del Popolo and Santa Maria del Popolo; St. Peter's Square, the Scala Regia and interior embellishments in the Vatican Palace and St. Peter's; Sant'Andrea al Quirinale; part of the Quirinal Palace; the Arsenal of Civitavecchia, the obelisk and elephant in Piazza della Minerva; and the Chigi Palace. The Palazzo Chigi in Rome is not to be confused with the Palazzo Chigi in S. Quirico d'Orcia in Tuscany, or the Palazzo Chigi di Formello.

== Foreign relations ==
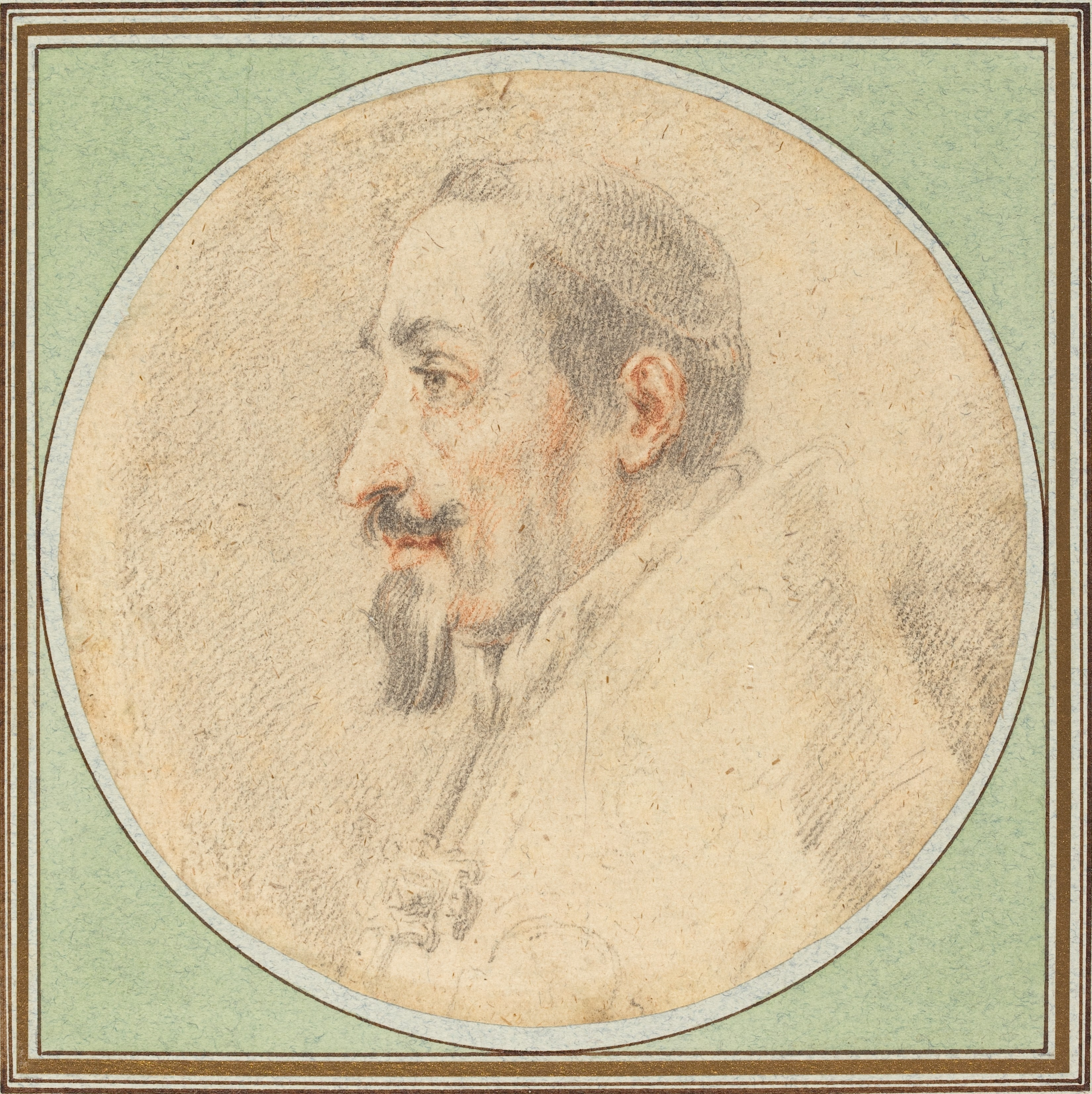
Drawing of Pope Alexander VII by Andrea Sacchi

=== Malta ===
Before being elected as Pontiff, Chigi served as Inquisitor on the Island of Malta where he resided mostly at the Inquisitor's Palace in Birgu (alias Città Vittoriosa). At that time, Malta was a fiefdom of the Knights Hospitallers of the Sovereign Order of Saint John of Jerusalem, Knights of Malta, from which he bought one hundred slaves in 1662 for his naval squadron.

=== Sweden ===
The conversion of Queen Christina of Sweden (1632–1654) occurred during Alexander VII's reign. After her abdication the queen came to reside in Rome, where she was confirmed in her baptism by the Pope, in whom she found a generous friend and benefactor, on Christmas Day, 1655. She was described by the Pope as 'a queen without a realm, a Christian without faith, and a woman without shame.' He was also said to have accused her of being 'a woman born of a barbarian, barbarously brought up and living with barbarous thoughts', therefore indicating that their relationship might have been contentious at best.

Shortly after her arrival in Rome, she quickly became the centre of Roman fashion and parties. However, following the pre-Lenten Carnival in 1656, Alexander VII quickly regretted having invited her to Rome since there existed an atmosphere of immorality which was linked to the Carnival. While the pontiff had originally hoped that Christina would become an inspiration for those considering conversion to the faith, he was dismayed that her interests were primarily political, even to the point that she helped plot the conquest of Naples with Cardinal Mazarin.

=== France ===
In foreign policy, his instincts were not as humanist or as successful. Alexander VII's pontificate was shadowed by continual friction with Cardinal Mazarin, adviser to and effectively chief minister of Louis XIV of France (1643–1715), who had opposed him during the negotiations that led to the Peace of Westphalia and who defended the prerogatives of the Gallican Church. During the conclave, Mazarin had been hostile to Chigi's election, but was in the end had been compelled to accept him as a compromise. However, he prevented Louis XIV from sending the usual embassy of obedience to Alexander VII, and, while he lived, foiled the appointment of a French ambassador to Rome, diplomatic affairs being meantime conducted by cardinal protectors, generally personal enemies of the Pope. In 1662, Louis XIV made the equally hostile Duc de Crequi his ambassador. By his abuse of the traditional right of asylum granted to ambassadorial precincts in Rome, Crequi precipitated a quarrel between France and the papacy, which resulted in Alexander VII's temporary loss of Avignon and his forced acceptance of the humiliating Treaty of Pisa in 1664.

=== Spain and Portugal ===
Alexander VII favored the Spanish in their claims against Portugal, which had reestablished its traditional independence in 1640. His pontificate was also marked by protracted controversies with Portugal.

== Jesuits and Jansenism ==
Alexander VII favoured the Jesuits. When the Venetians called for help in Crete against the Ottoman Turks, the Pope extracted in return a promise that the Jesuits should be permitted back in Venetian territory, from which they had been expelled in 1606. He also continued to take the Jesuit part in their conflict with the Jansenists, whose condemnation he had vigorously supported as advisor to Pope Innocent X. The French Jansenists professed that the propositions condemned in 1653 were not in fact to be found in Augustinus, written by Cornelius Jansen. Alexander VII confirmed that they were too, by the bull Ad sanctam beati Petri sedem (16 October 1656) declaring that five propositions extracted by a group of theologians from the Sorbonne out of Jansen's work, mostly concerning grace and the fallen nature of man, were heretical, including the proposition according to which to say "that Christ died, or shed His blood for all men" would be a semipelagian error. He also sent to France his famous "formulary", that was to be signed by all the clergy as a means of detecting and extirpating Jansenism and which inflamed public opinion, leading to Blaise Pascal's defense of Jansenism.

== Works ==
Alexander VII disliked the business of state, preferring literature and philosophy; a collection of his Latin poems appeared at Paris in 1656 under the title Philomathi Labores Juveniles. He also encouraged architecture, and the general improvement of Rome, where houses were razed to straighten and widen streets and where he had the opportunity to be a great patron for Gian Lorenzo Bernini: the decorations of the church of Santa Maria del Popolo, titular churches for several of the Chigi cardinals, the Scala Regia, the Chair of St. Peter in St. Peter's Basilica. In particular, he sponsored Bernini's construction of the beautiful colonnade in St. Peter's Square.

According to William Roberts, Alexander VII wrote one of the most authoritative documents related to the heliocentrism issue. However, the document is not about any astronomic model and is not part of the Magisterium Ecclesiae. The Pope published his Index Librorum Prohibitorum Alexandri VII Pontificis Maximi jussu editus which presented anew the contents of the Index of Forbidden Books which had condemned many works related to many different matters: among them were the works of Copernicus and Galileo. He prefaced this with the bull Speculatores Domus Israel (1592), stating his reasons: "in order that the whole history of each case may be known." 'For this purpose,' the Pontiff stated, 'we have caused the Tridentine and Clementine Indices to be added to this general Index, and also all the relevant decrees up to the present time, that have been issued since the Index of our predecessor Clement, that nothing profitable to the faithful interested in such matters might seem omitted." Among those included were the previous decrees placing various heliocentric works on the Index ("...which we will should be considered as though it were inserted in these presents, together with all, and singular, the things contained therein...") and, according to Roberts, using his Apostolic authority he bound the faithful to its contents ("...and approve with Apostolic authority by the tenor of these presents, and: command and enjoin all persons everywhere to yield this Index a constant and complete obedience...") Thus, for the geocentrists, Alexander turned definitively against the heliocentric view of the Solar System. After Alexander VII's pontificate, the Index underwent a number of revisions. "In 1758 the general prohibition against works advocating heliocentrism was removed from the Index of prohibited books, although the specific ban on uncensored versions of the Dialogue and Copernicus's De Revolutionibus remained. All traces of official opposition to heliocentrism by the church disappeared in 1835 when these works were finally dropped from the Index". The Index was abolished entirely in 1966.

=== Theology ===
Alexander VII's Apostolic Constitution, Sollicitudo omnium ecclesiarum (8 December 1661), laid out the doctrine of the Immaculate Conception of the Blessed Virgin Mary in terms almost identical to those utilized by Pope Pius IX when he issued his infallible definition Ineffabilis Deus. Pius IX cites Alexander VII's bull in his footnote 11.

=== Morality ===
On 18 March 1666 in a decree issued, Alexander VII issued a correction on various moral matters that expanded upon a decree he had issued previously on 24 September 1665. In his decree, Alexander VII confirmed the authority and rulings from the Council of Trent while advising on matters ranging from sacramental confession, heresy, to proper courtship practices. The pontiff also confirmed the rulings made by predecessors such as Urban VIII in matters that concerned moral teachings. Pope Innocent XI later expanded upon some of his points in 1679.

== Ecclesial activities ==
=== Consistories ===
Alexander VII created 38 cardinals in six consistories which included Flavio Chigi, his nephew in the role of Cardinal-Nephew, while naming Giulio Rospigliosi as a cardinal and whom would eventually succeed him as Pope Clement IX. Out of all the cardinals whom he had named, the pope had reserved five of those names in pectore and announced them at later dates.

=== Religious orders ===
Alexander VII reformed the Constitution for the Cistercians in the papal brief In suprema on 19 April 1666 which effectively ended a dispute that had lasted for decades on the question of reform which had long since divided the Cistercians. The pope also played a role in changes made to the Barnabites and the Piarists (1656). In 1666, he formally approved the Congregation of Jesus and Mary which had been founded by Saint John Eudes while in 1655 he had given his approval to the Congregation of the Mission which had been founded by Saint Vincent de Paul.

=== Liturgical actions ===
In 1661, the pope forbade the translation of the Roman Missal into French which had been published in 1660 by the priest Joseph de Voisin. With the French episcopacy condemning the bilingual Missal in late 1660, the pontiff ratified this in a papal bull on 12 January 1661. In 1656, he revoked the decree of Innocent X and allowed the Chinese rites to be used by the Jesuit missionaries in China. Alexander VII expanded upon this in 1659 when he dispensed the Chinese clergy from having to pray the Divine Office in Latin.

=== Canonizations and beatifications ===
Throughout his pontificate, Alexander VII beatified two individuals (Francis de Sales and Pedro de Arbués) and canonized five others which included Ferdinand III and Félix de Valois amongst others.

=== Eastern Churches ===
In 1661, the pope assured the Patriarch of the Chaldean Catholic Church, Shimun XII Yoalaha, that the Latin Church episcopacy would support those of the Chaldean Church. During his papacy, the pope also dispatched a mission consisting of Carmelite friars to Syria in order to evangelize and spread the faith in the Middle East. The pope also created the Archdiocese of Aleppo in 1659.

== Death ==
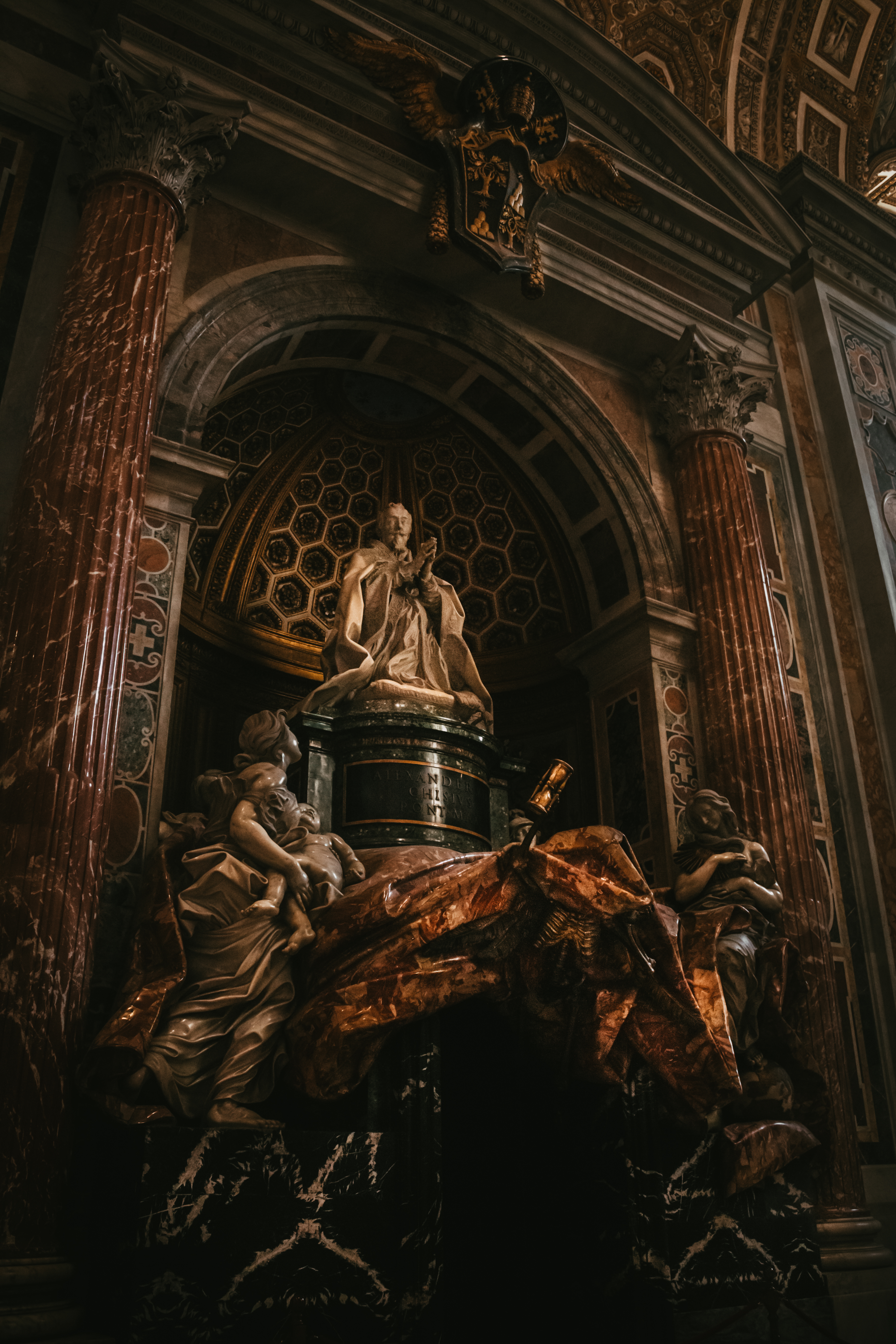
The tomb of Pope Alexander VII, by Gianlorenzo Bernini

Alexander VII died at age 68 from kidney failure. His health had initially begun to fail around March, with his ailment consistently causing him great pain. He kept his coffin in his bedroom, and a skull (carved by famed sculptor Bernini) on his writing table, because he was always aware that he would someday die. Suddenly taken by a fever on 18 May, he died on 22 May. A seventeenth-century pamphlet credited to Ayres, titled A short Account of the Life and Death of Pope Alexander VII, contains many fascinating details about Alexander's passing. According to this pamphlet, Alexander, although bedridden, wanted to celebrate the Passion to ready himself for his impending death. Neither his surgeon nor his confessor was able to persuade him to save his strength. He blessed the large crowd of people on Easter, the last time they would ever see him alive.

A precise and detailed account of the pope's last days is given in the Diary of the principal Master of Ceremonies, Fulvio Servantio, an official eyewitness to all the proceedings.

Short Account of the Life and Death of Pope Alexander VII:

Promoted to the cardinalship eight of those select persons, whom he supposed, for their great worth and labours, bestowed for the good of the Papal See, had merited the advancement to so high dignity.

But his disease increasing, four days after, he was assaulted by a grievous fit, from which he concluded that his sickness was mortal, and not withstanding, it grew more and more violent daily, yet for all this, he had thoughts of performing the long ceremonies of Holy Thursday, to prepare himself for death, as he said, by meditating on the sacred mysteries of the passion of Jesus Christ, and would have executed his intentions in despight of his pains, if his physicians and chyrurgeons, together with his confessor had not persuaded him to the contrary; remonstrating to him the inconveniencies which might arise, from the hard labours which are inseparable from such prolixe ceremonies. And although he was perswaded by them all that time, yet was he resolved with that little strength he had left him (though much broken and extenuated by his disease) on Easter-day upon the Gallery of Monte Cavallo, where this function is used to be performed, with a solemn benediction in Pontificalthus, to bless the people, which there flocked in exceeding great multitudes, being driven there-unto not only out of devotion, but also by a desire of seeing their pastor yet whole and alive. He blessed them, having raised himself up twice according to the custom, without the help of the pontifical seat; and this was the lat time that he saw his flock, or they him.

Ex lastly, be recommends to their care and protection, his Cardinal Nephew, his aged brother, and the rest of his kindred, and himself to their prayers. This being spoken, he lifted up his hands and blessed them, and then their eminencies approached to the bed side with tears in their eyes, and after they had taken pains to comfort him, with great tenderness they kissed his hand, and departed.

At last, they being all departed, and only his familiar friends and ghostly-fathers continuing in the room with him, he altogether applied himself to his devotion, often repeating these words, Cupio disolvi et esse cum Christo ["I desire to be discharged from my debt and to be with Christ"]. And those which assisted him he caused continually to read spiritual books, & divers prayers, and psalms, especially the penitential psalms, &c.

After he had received both the Eucharist and the Extreme Unction, he disposed himself for his Transit, with a marvelous undantedness; and had already even lost his Speech, when one of his religious men standing by exhorted him to do an act of contrition, and to aske God pardon of his sins, he collecting his breath, which was flying away, with a most lanquisting voice, which could hardly be understood, answered Ita ["Yes"]. The same added that he should hope in the mercies of God, who is always ready to shower down his mercies upon a penitent heart; the pope answered with the same weakness of speech, Certe ["Certainly"]. Which were the last words which proceeded out of his mouth.

He was often visited by the cardinals, contrary to the former customs, who were willing to be round about his bed till his end. And on Sunday the 22. of May, about 22. of the clock, he quietly rendred his spirits to his Creator, in the 60 year of his age, and 13 of his pontificate; and the same evening, the usual ceremony being performed by the cardinal lord Chamberlain, the corps were arrayed in the accustomed vestments, put into a litter of crimson velvet open on all sides, compassed round about by the penitentiary fathers, with lighted torches in their hands, accompanied by the guards and light horses, followed by the artillery, and with the Rexe Guard of Curiassiers, being carried to the Vatican, and there the next morning opened, there was found on one part of the lungs, fastned to one of his sides, a touch of a black spot; one of his kidneys wasted, and some carnosities of fleshy kyrnels instead of it, from whence the passage of the urine was hindred; and an ulcer of the reins, which of all his other diseases was the worst: from thence, being embalmed and pontifically appareled, he was carried the next day to the cathedral of St. Peter, and placed in the chapel of the most Holy Sacrament, where was a concourse of an infinite number of people, to kiss his feet, and take from him whatsoever they could lay hands on, to preserve to themselves as holy reliques. Finis

Alexander VII died in 1667 and was memorialised in a spectacular tomb by Bernini. However, Pope Innocent XI ordered that "...the naked Truth [be] covered up with a drapery colored in white." It is famous for the skeleton holding a gilded hourglass, just above the doors. He was succeeded by Pope Clement IX (1667–1669). As the pope lay dying, he said to the cardinals gathered at his bedside: "We never aspired to the tiara, nor took any steps to reach it. We have employed the moneys of the apostolical chamber solely in the service of the Catholic religion, and the embellishment of Rome and the building of churches. We were a whole year pontiff before we summoned any relative of ours to Rome, and we only at length did so because the Sacred College vanquished our unwillingness. We exhort you to elect a successor qualified to repair any errors we have committed in our pontificate".

== Memory ==
The poet John Flowre wrote a poem about the tomb of Pope Alexander in 1667.

== See also ==
- Cardinals created by Alexander VII

Catholic Church titles
| Preceded by Girolamo de Franchis | Bishop of Nardò; 1635–1652 | Succeeded by Calanio della Ciaja |
| Preceded by Martino Alfieri | Apostolic Nuncio to Germany; 1639–1651 | Succeeded by Giuseppe Sanfelice |
| Preceded by Giovanni Giacomo Panciroli | Cardinal Secretary of State; 1651–1655 | Succeeded by Giulio Rospigliosi |
| Preceded by Mario Theodoli | Cardinal-Priest of Santa Maria del Popolo; 1652–1655 | Succeeded by Giangiacomo Teodoro Trivulzio |
| Preceded by Marco Antonio Coccini as bishop | Archbishop of Imola; 1653–1655 | Succeeded by Giovanni Stefano Donghi as bishop |
| Preceded by Innocent X | Pope; 7 April 1655 – 22 May 1667 | Succeeded by Clement IX |
