= Cum occasione =

1653 apostolic constitution condemning Jansenism

Cum occasione Apostolic constitution of Pope Innocent X
- Signature date: 31 maggio 1653
- Subject: Condemned five propositions found in Cornelius Jansen's Augustinus as heretical

Cum occasione is an apostolic constitution in the form of a papal bull promulgated by Pope Innocent X in 1653 which condemned five propositions said to have been found in Cornelius Jansen's Augustinus as heretical.

The five errors of Jansen on grace condemned in Cum occasione are:

1. "Some of God's commandments are impossible to just men who wish and strive to keep them, considering the powers they actually have; the grace by which these precepts may become possible is also wanting to them." (Note: Denzinger (2012, n. 2001) translated the first proposition as: "Some of God's commandments cannot be observed by just men with the strength they have in the present state, even if they wish and strive to observe them; not do they have the grace that would make their observance possible.")
2. "In the state of fallen nature no one ever resists interior grace."
3. "In order to merit or demerit, in the state of fallen nature, we must be free from all external constraint, but not from interior necessity." (Note: Where Otten translated "we must be free from all external constraint, but not from interior necessity", Denzinger translated as "it is necessary for man to have freedom from necessity, but freedom from coercion suffices.")
4. "The Semi-Pelagians admitted the necessity of interior preventing grace for all acts, (Note: Where Otten translated "interior preventing grace", Denzinger translated as "prevenient interior grace".) even for the beginning of faith; but they fell into heresy in pretending that this grace is such that man may either follow or resist it." (Note: Where Otten translated "but they fell into heresy in pretending that this grace is such that man may either follow or resist it", Denzinger translated as "and their heresy consisted of this, that they held this grace to be such that the human will could either resist it or submit to it.")
5. "It is Semi-Pelagian to say that Christ died or shed His blood for all men." (Note: Where Otten translated "for all men", Denzinger added "for all men without exception".)

Bernard Otten explained, in A manual of the history of dogmas, that the first four of these propositions are absolutely condemned as heretical; while the fifth is condemned as heretical when taken in the sense that Christ died only for the predestined.

== See also ==
- Formulary controversy
- Ad sanctam beati Petri sedem – Defined the signification of propositions said to have been found in Augustinus
- Regiminis Apostolici – Defined the Formula of Submission for the Jansenists
