= Enchiridion symbolorum, definitionum et declarationum de rebus fidei et morum =

Compendium of Catholic texts

The Enchiridion (full title: Enchiridion symbolorum, definitionum et declarationum de rebus fidei et morum; "A handbook of symbols, definitions and declarations on matters of faith and morals"), usually translated as The Sources of Catholic Dogma, is a compendium of texts on Catholic theology and morality.

This compendium was first published in 1854, and has been updated many times in subsequent editions since. It is sometimes referred to as Denzinger, after its first editor, Heinrich Joseph Dominicus Denzinger. Since 2025, its editor is Michael Seewald.

== Name ==
The name Enchiridion (from Greek cheir, "hand") means "handbook". It was originally published as Enchiridion symbolorum et definitionum, quae de rebus fidei et morum a conciliis oecumenicis et summis pontificibus emanarunt. The work is today published as Enchiridion symbolorum, definitionum et declarationum de rebus fidei et morum.

The Enchiridion is sometimes referred to as Denzinger, after its first editor, Heinrich Joseph Dominicus Denzinger. It is commonly abbreviated 'D', 'D.', or 'Dz'. It is also referred to as 'DS' in editions edited by Adolf Schönmetzer due to a revision in numbering ('DS' sometimes continues to be used as a general reference to even later editions), as 'DB' for editions edited by Clément Bannwart, and as 'DH' for editions edited by Peter Hünermann.

== Structure ==
The Enchiridion is chronologically ordered. It includes teachings of popes and ecumenical councils. The Enchiridion does not repeat all the full texts.
