= States of Flanders =

Coat of arms of the Counts of Flanders

The States of Flanders were a representative institution in the medieval and early modern County of Flanders. Initially it consisted only of the Third Estate, with representatives of the three cities of Bruges, Ghent and Ypres. Around 1350, the rural Liberty of Bruges also obtained representation in the States.

== History ==
In the Burgundian Netherlands, the States of Flanders were the first host of the States-General of the Netherlands, convened in Bruges on 9 January 1464.

In 1579–1581, during the Eighty Years' War, the cities and the States of Flanders subscribed to the Union of Utrecht and the Act of Abjuration declaring independence from Habsburg rule, but royal troops reconquered most of the Flemish territory (excepting Zeelandic Flanders) and restored Habsburg rule.

Under the government of the Archdukes Albert and Isabella, a representation of the First Estate was included in the composition of the States of Flanders.

From 1754, smaller towns in Flanders were granted representation in the States, and the responsibilities of the body were extended from voting taxes and levying troops to oversight of public works and public assets.

On 4 January 1790, the States of Flanders declared independence from Austrian rule, and seven days later, on 11 January 1790, joined the United States of Belgium. All Southern Netherlands "States" disappeared four years later, during French revolutionary occupation.

== Archives ==
The main repository of archives relating to the States of Flanders is the State Archives of Ghent.

== Literature ==
- Wim Blockmans and Walter Prevenier, Handelingen van de Leden en van de Staten van Vlaanderen, 1467-1477 (Brussels, 1971)
- M. Nuyttens and A. Zoete, "De Vier Leden en de Staten van Vlaanderen", De gewestelijke en lokale overheidsinstellingen in Vlaanderen tot 1795, ed. W. Prevenier and B. Augustyn (Brussels, 1997), pp. 67-78.
- M. Nuyttens, Inventaris van het Archief van de Staten van Vlaanderen (Brussels, 1986)
- Walter Prevenier, Handelingen van de Leden en van de Staten van Vlaanderen, 1384-1405 (Brussels, 1959)
- H. Van Houtte, Tafels van de resolutieboeken der Staten van Vlaanderen, vol. 1 (Brussels, 1936), for the years 1582-1583, 1614-1631
- J. Dhondt, Tafels van de resolutieboeken der Staten van Vlaanderen, vol. 2 (Brussels, 1941), for the years 1631-1656
