= Augustinus (Jansenist book) =

Book by Cornelius Jansenius

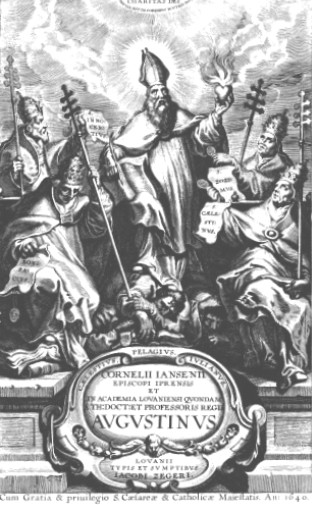
- Author: Cornelius Jansen
- Original title: Augustinus seu doctrina Sancti Augustini de humanae naturae sanitate, aegritudine, medicina adversus Pelagianos et Massilianses
- Language: Latin
- Subject: Pelagianism, Augustine of Hippo
- Published: 1640 by Jacobus Zegers
- Media type: Three volumes
- OCLC: 174507565
- LC Class: BT1450 .J3 1640

Augustinus seu doctrina Sancti Augustini de humanae naturae sanitate, aegritudine, medicina adversus Pelagianos et Massilianses, (transl. "Augustine, or the Doctrine of Saint Augustine on the Health, Sickness, and Medicine of Human Nature, Against the Pelagians and the Massilians") known by its short title Augustinus, is a theological work in Latin by Cornelius Jansen. Published posthumously in Louvain by Jacobus Zegers in 1640, it was in three parts:

1. On Pelagianism (De Hæresi Pelagiana, "Concerning Peligian Heresy")
2. On original sin (De Gratia Primi Hominis, "The Grace of the First Man" and De Statu Naturæ Lapsæ, "The Fallen State of Nature")
3. On divine grace (De Gratia Christi Salvatoris, "The Grace of Christ the Savior")

It began with the proposition that Augustine of Hippo was a man chosen by God to reveal the doctrine of grace. Thus, by this logic, any later Catholic teaching contrary to Augustine's work should be revised to match it. The text stoked the theological controversies that raged in France and much of Europe after the spread of Jansenism. Five of the books' propositions were condemned as heretical in the apostolic constitution Cum occasione promulgated in 1653 by Pope Innocent X. In reaction to this condemnation, Blaise Pascal wrote his 17th and 18th Lettres provinciales in 1657. The five propositions were the focus of the Formulary Controversy, a 17th and 18th century recusancy by Jansenists of the Formula of Submission for the Jansenists.

== Bibliography ==
- M. Flick and Z. Alszeghy, Antropología teológica, Ediciones Sígueme, Salamanca, 1971.
