= Cornelius Jansen =

Dutch Bishop (1585-1638)

- Bishop of Ypres
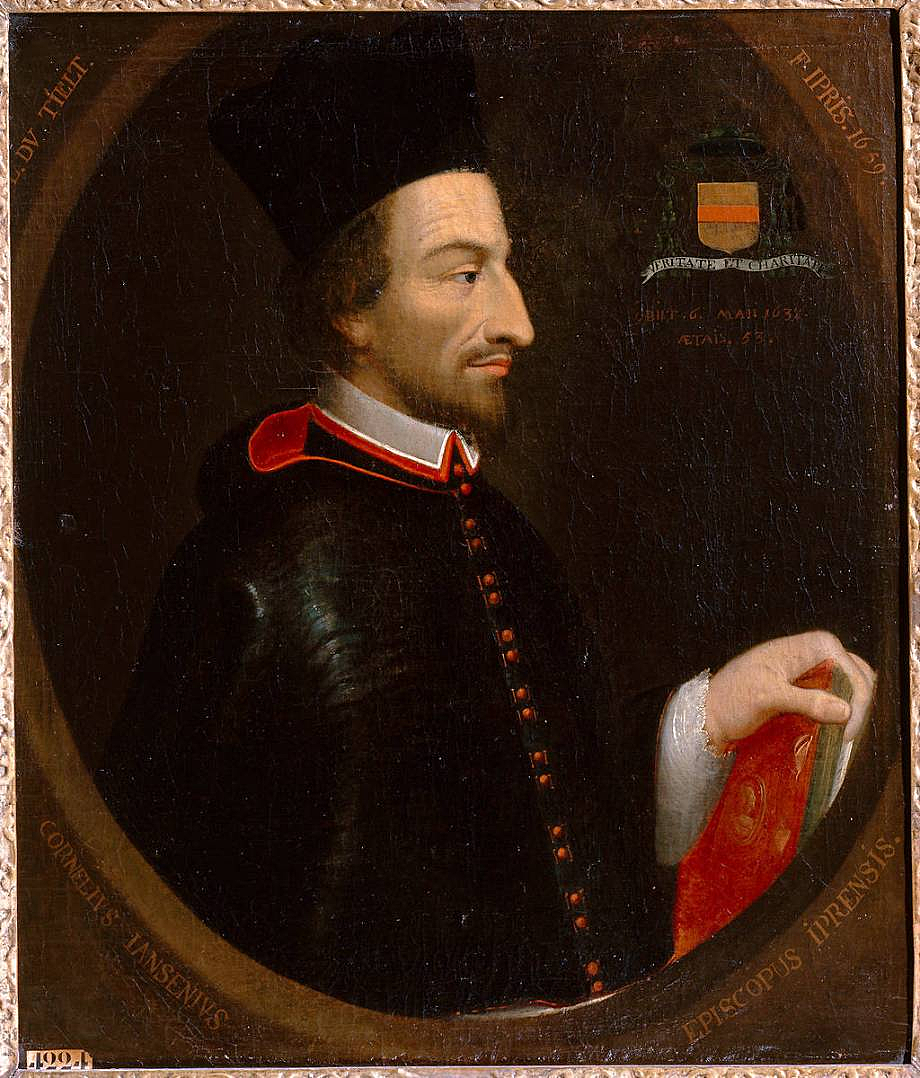
- Church: Catholic Church
- Diocese: Diocese of Ypres
- Installed: 1635
- Term ended: 1638
- Predecessor: Georges Chamberlain
- Successor: Josse Bouckaert

Personal details
- Born: 28 October 1585 Acquoy, County of Holland, Dutch Republic
- Died: 6 May 1638 (aged 52) Ypres, Spanish Netherlands
- Education: University of Leuven
- Signature: Cornelius Jansen's signature

Cornelius Jansen (/ˈdʒænsən/; Dutch: [ˈjɑnsə(n)]; Latinized name Cornelius Jansenius; also Corneille Jansen; 28 October 1585 – 6 May 1638) was the Dutch Catholic bishop of Ypres in Flanders and the father of a theological movement known as Jansenism.

== Biography ==
He was born to humble Catholic parents Jan Ottje, a smith, and Lijntje Gijsberts at Acquoy (then in the province of Holland, now in Gelderland). In 1602 he entered the University of Leuven, then in the throes of an ideological conflict between the Jesuit – or scholastic – party and the followers of Michael Baius, who swore by St. Augustine. Jansen ended by attaching himself strongly to the latter "Augustinian" party, and presently made a momentous friendship with a like-minded fellow-student, Jean du Vergier de Hauranne, afterwards Abbé de Saint-Cyran.

After taking his degree he went to Paris, partly to improve his health by a change of scene, partly to study Greek. Eventually he joined du Vergier at his country home near Bayonne, and spent some years teaching at the bishop's college. All his spare time was spent in studying the early Fathers with du Vergier, and laying plans for a reform of the Church.

In 1616 he returned to Leuven, to take charge of the college of St Pulcheria, a hostel for Dutch students of theology. Pupils found him a somewhat choleric and exacting master and a great recluse from academic society. However, he took an active part in the university's resistance to the Jesuits, for they had established a theological school of their own in Leuven, which was proving itself a formidable rival to the official university faculty of divinity. In the hope of suppressing their encroachments, Jansen was sent twice to Madrid, in 1624 and 1626; the second time he narrowly escaped the Inquisition. He warmly supported the Catholic missionary archbishop (apostolic vicar) of the Catholic Holland Mission in the Dutch Republic, Philippus Rovenius, in his contests with the Jesuits, who were trying to evangelize that country without regard to the archbishop's wishes. He also crossed more than once the Dutch Calvinist–Presbyterian champion, Gisbertus Voetius, still remembered for his attacks on René Descartes.

Antipathy to the Jesuits brought Jansen no nearer to Protestantism; on the contrary, he yearned to beat them with their own weapons, chiefly by showing them that Catholics could interpret the Bible in just as mystical and pietistic a manner. This became the great object of his lectures, when he was appointed regius professor of scriptural interpretation at Leuven in 1630. Still more was it the object of his Augustinus, a bulky treatise on the theology of St. Augustine, barely finished at the time of his death.

Its preparation was his chief occupation since his return to Leuven. He had introduced in this treaty a long development favourable to contrition (IIIrd part, De gratia Christi salvatoris, book V, chap.XXI–XXV). In its appendix, titled Erroris Massiliensium, et opinionis quorumdam recentiorum parallelon et statera, he harshly condemned the Jesuits, in particular Luis de Molina, Gabriel Vasquez and Leonardus Lessius.

But Jansen, as he said, did not mean to be a school-pedant all his life; and there were moments when he entertained political ambitions. He looked forward to a time when Flanders would throw off the Spanish yoke and become an independent Catholic republic, possibly even Flemish-ruled, according to the model of the Protestant United Provinces. These ideas became known to his Spanish rulers, and to assuage them he wrote a philippic called the Mars gallicus (1635), a violent attack on French ambitions generally, and on Cardinal Richelieu's indifference to international Catholic interests in particular.

The Mars gallicus did little to help Jansen's rather persecuted theological friends in France, but it reversed Madrid's wrath with Jansen; in 1636 he was appointed bishop of Ypres (Ieper) in West Flanders by the Pope and the Spanish Court. Within two years he was however cut down at age 52 by a sudden illness; the Augustinus, the book of his life, was published posthumously in 1640.

Opposed to Jansenism, a little group of theological doctors from the Sorbonne extracted 8 propositions of Jansenius's Augustinus, later reduced to 5, treating of the problems concerning the relation between nature and grace. They accused Jansenius of having misinterpreted St. Augustine, conflating Jansenists with Lutherans. This led Pope Innocent X to condemn in 1653 these 5 propositions in the papal bull Cum Occasione, without attributing them to Jansenius in particular. The 5 propositions were condemned again by Pope Alexander VII three years later in the apostolic constitution Ad sanctam beati Petri sedem. The Jesuits, who then enjoyed predominant political and theological power (including a personal confessor to the King of France), then persuaded the Pope to force all Jansenists to sign a formulary leading them to admit the papal bull and to confess to their errors. The formulary controversy led Pascal to write the famous Lettres provinciales (1657) in which he harshly attacked the Jesuits and their moral, in particular their casuistry.

Following this anonymous publication, the King sent spies everywhere, condemned the librarians and successfully attempted to discover the author of the Lettres provinciales. The Jansenists of Port-Royal, Antoine Arnauld, Pierre Nicole, La Mère Angélique, Soeur Agnès, etc., were forced to sign the formulary. Although ostensibly obeying Papal authority, they added that the condemnation would only be sensible if the 5 allegedly heretical propositions were in fact found in Jansenius' Augustinus, and claimed that they did not figure there. The Jansenists' reasoning was that the Pope had of course the power to condemn heretical propositions, but not to cause that which did not figure in Jansenius' Augustinus to actually be there. This strategy would impose decades of theological disputes and debate.

On the other hand, Pascal and some other Jansenists adopted a radical strategy, alleging that condemning Jansenius was equivalent to condemning the Father of the Church, St. Augustine himself, and adamantly refused to sign the formulary, with or without reserve. This in turn led to the further radicalization of the King and of the Jesuits, and in 1661 the Convent of Port-Royal was closed and the Jansenist community dissolved – it would be ultimately razed in 1710 on orders of Louis XIV. The controversy did not involve only Papal authority, but rather his authority concerning Biblical exegesis.

Further controversy led to the bull Unigenitus, issued by Clement XI in 1713, which marked the end of Catholic toleration of Jansenist doctrine. The bull Unigenitus, dated 8 September 1713, was produced with the contribution of Gregorio Selleri, a lector at the College of Saint Thomas, the future Pontifical University of Saint Thomas Aquinas, Angelicum, fostered the condemnation of Jansenism by condemning 101 propositions from the Réflexions morales of Quesnel as heretical, and as identical with propositions already condemned in the writings of Jansen.

Up until the French Revolution, Jansenism would live on as a political force in France, supported by some chairs in the parlements of Paris. Anonymous Jansenists published a magazine called Nouvelles ecclésiastiques, which frequently featured anti-Jesuit propaganda. Eventually, Jansenists would collaborate with independent-minded Gallicanists in promoting the Jesuits' expulsion from France in 1764.

== See also ==
- Ultrajectine
- Jansenism
- Old Catholic Church of the Netherlands
