= History of the term Wallon =

Germanic word

The history of the term Wallon and its derivatives begins with the ancient Germanic word walh, which generally referred to Celtic- or Romance-speaking populations with whom the Germanic peoples had contact. But the original form of its etymon and its precise origin in the French language has not been definitively established. It may have originated from Medieval Latin (Note: Wallo, wallonis) after being borrowed from Old Franconian. Another possibility is that it derives, through a change in suffix, from wallec, (Note: Wallec (1332), walesc, walesch (circa 1350)) meaning "the langue d'oïl spoken in the Low Countries." The term wallon, as we know it today, first appeared in the 15th century in the Memoirs of the medieval chronicler Jean de Haynin. Over time, the semantic scope of Wallon and its derivatives, such as the toponym Wallonie, has gradually narrowed, becoming an endonym and continuing to diminish even today. (Note: The geographical area evoked by the word wallon is therefore like a thin skin [...] the linguistic meaning (adjective and noun), which is the primary and still fundamental meaning of the adjective wallon, quickly substantivized, has been refined in successive nuances [...]. (Henry 1990, p. 59).)

This lexicological history has been primarily studied within intellectual circles of the Walloon Movement. The principal work on this subject is Histoire des mots Wallon et Wallonie by Albert Henry, which, according to Jean-Pol Demacq, reflects the Walloons' desire to "find answers to their questions, tracing the winding and very contemporary path of the search for [their] Walloon identity."

== History of the Term Wallon ==
=== Germanic Origins and Latin Borrowing ===
The earliest mentions resembling the French word Wallon that have come down to us are in Latin, clearly indicating its Germanic origin:

Igitur primus Adelardus nativam linguam non-habuit Theutonicam, sed quam corrupte nominant Romanam, Theutonice Walonicam (As for the first Adelard, his native language was not Germanic, but the one which, through an erroneous term, is called Romana, while in Germanic it is called Walonica).

This phrase explicitly highlights the Germanic origin of the term, which likely stems from a Frankish word of the time derived from the much older name Walh, dating back to Proto-Germanic in the 4th century BCE. The adjective Walonicus or its Central French variant Gualonicus means "in Romance" and is used in opposition to the adjective Teutonicus, which means "in Germanic." This distinction is linguistic, not ethnic, as J.R.R. Tolkien asserts in his essay English and Welsh (Note: See the article *Walhaz.) (English and Welsh). It refers to the entire Romance-speaking population of Gaul, but its lexical scope quickly narrows to designate only the speakers of a langue d'oïl, that is, the inhabitants of Neustria. This is evident in another Latin text where its usage suggests that it was likely integrated into the Latin vocabulary of the time, which pertains to the bishopric of Tournai and concerns the granting of scholarships for theological studies at the Sorbonne. There is no mention of the Germanic origin of the adjective Vallonicae, which could indicate that it had entered common usage in this bilingual diocese, straddling both Romance and Germanic-speaking regions.

=== Early appearances in Romance languages ===
It was not until the late 13th century that words related to Wallon appeared in the langue d'oïl. One such term, walois, is found in the Tournament of Chauvency (1285), a long poem by Jacques Bretel, who describes a herald of Alsatian origin:

Lors commenca à fastroillier / Et le bon fransoiz essilier, / Et d'un walois tout despannei / M'a dit "Bien soiez vos venei, / Sire Jaquenet, volentiers" (Then he began to babble and butcher the good French language, and in a completely mangled walois, he said to me: 'You are welcome, Sir Jaquenet, gladly').

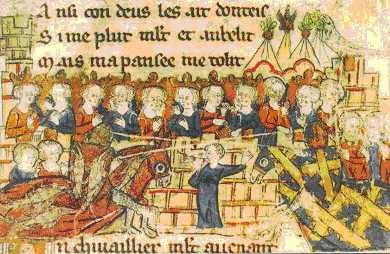
Details of the Chauvency Tournament.

In some manuscripts, Et d'un walois tout despannei is replaced by en un roman tout despannei ("in a completely mangled Romance"). Here, walois refers to the Romance language spoken in a region close to those where Germanic languages were spoken—that is, a langue d'oïl. Another variant, walesch(e), the feminine form of walois, appears in other texts, such as the Poésies of Gilles Li Muisis: "Car je piers men walesch" (For I lose my walesch). Here, too, walesch refers to a langue d'oïl, although in Tournai, the term Romans was also used for the same language. The suffix -esche (from the Latinized Germanic -isca) was commonly used in langue d'oïl to form feminine adjectives of nationality, along with its Norman-Picard variants -eske and -esque, as in tiesche langue ("German language"), danesche langue ("Danish language"), and la gente englesche ("the English people"). Thus, walois is merely a variant of gaulois (Gallic), as northern langue d'oïl dialects (Norman, Picard, Walloon, Champenois, Burgundian, and Low Lorraine) retained the initial w- sound, later sometimes evolving into v. In contrast, further south it evolved into [gʷ] and then g in standard French.

In 1447 Jean Wauquelin, a translator "native to the land of Picardy", used wallec and its variants wallecq and wallet in his prose version of the legend of Gérard de Roussillon. He also employed ro(u)man, franc(h)ois, and langue maternelle to describe this language, without distinguishing it from French or a dialect, and without linking it to either written or spoken forms. Wallec is a Picard form where the original s in wallesc had already become silent.

In 1477 the term Pays walecques appears in the Doléances presented to Mary of Burgundy and in the Great Privilege, her response to those grievances.

The Belgian linguist Maurits Gysseling suggests that walesch likely existed in Dutch by the 11th century, although the earliest manuscripts showing its equivalent, walsch, date only from the 13th century. (Note: Letter from Maurits Gysseling to Albert Henry, May 20, 1972, quoted by Henry 1990, p. 25.)

Before the 14th century the verb walesquier ("to speak an incomprehensible language") also appears, (Note: Note the similarity in meaning with the verb wallonner, meaning "to speak with a thick accent.") notably in the Roman de Cassidorus by an author believed to be Baudoin Butor. Butor, who lived in the northern Picard-speaking region, implies, according to Albert Henry, the prior existence of wallesc and its use among Picard speakers.

Albert Henry concludes that, if the word wallon did exist at the time, which is uncertain, there were competing terms from other linguistic domains near Germanic regions, terms that seem to have been used only in limited areas. He also confirms that these terms do not denote an ethnic identity but rather a linguistic reality.

=== Birth of Wallon ===
The word wallon first appeared in the second half of the 15th century as Vallons. Jean de Haynin used it in opposition to Liégeois, recounting a skirmish around 1465 between the Duke of Burgundy's troops and the Liège garrison of Montenaken: Les dis Liegeois crioite 'Sain Denis et Sain Lambert', les Vallons et les Tiesons crioite 'Mourregot' ("The said Liégeois cried Saint Denis and Saint Lambert,' while the Vallons and the Tiesons cried 'Mourregot").

According to Henry it is significant that this first mention of Vallons comes from a Burgundian author, especially alongside Tiesons. This appearance coincides with the last appearances of equivalent terms, such as Wal(l)ec ("of Romance language") in the Great Privilege of Mary of Burgundy.

The first known use of Wallon with an initial W, meaning "inhabitant of the Romance-speaking region of the Low Countries", is found in the writings of Jean Froissart, a chronicler from the Mons-Valenciennes area, who served in the armies of Philip the Good and Charles the Bold, in the Picard region under Burgundian influence.

Wallon seems to have been a semi-scholarly creation that replaced an earlier term of the same etymological origin, more closely related to wal(l)ec than to walois, modeled after tiesson... whose earliest record, coincidentally, is from the Hainuyer Froissart.

The suffix -on replaced the earlier -e(s)c or -esch suffix, as it was commonly used to denote peoples (e.g., Teuton, Letton, Breton). The initial form walesch or walec likely derives from a more recent borrowing from Dutch (walesch, walec), which, like walois and gaulois, traces back to Old Low Franconian walhisk.

=== Wallon in the 16th century ===
In the 16th century the term Wallon gained widespread use, not only in French but also in other languages like Spanish and English. However, its meaning became somewhat ambiguous due to a semantic shift: distinctions between French and regional dialects were becoming clearer, and around this time, the term dialect emerged as well.

==== Jean Lemaire de Belges and the regional sense ====
Albert Henry considers Jean Lemaire de Belges—or of Bavai—a pivotal source on the use of Wallon. In the first book of his Illustrations de la Gaule et singularitez de Troye (Illustrations de la Gaule et singularitez de Troye) (1510–1511), he writes:

Even today, we still say that the town of Nivelles is in Roman Brabant because of the difference in language. For the other Brabanters speak Thiois or Teutonic, that is to say, Low German. And those who speak the old Gallic language, which we call Walloon or Roman, like the Roman de la Rose. And we use said ancient Walloon or Roman language in our Belgian Gaul, that is to say, in Hainaut, Cambrai, Artois, Namur, Liège, Lorraine, Ardennes, and Roman Brabant, and it is very different from French, which is more modern and livelier.

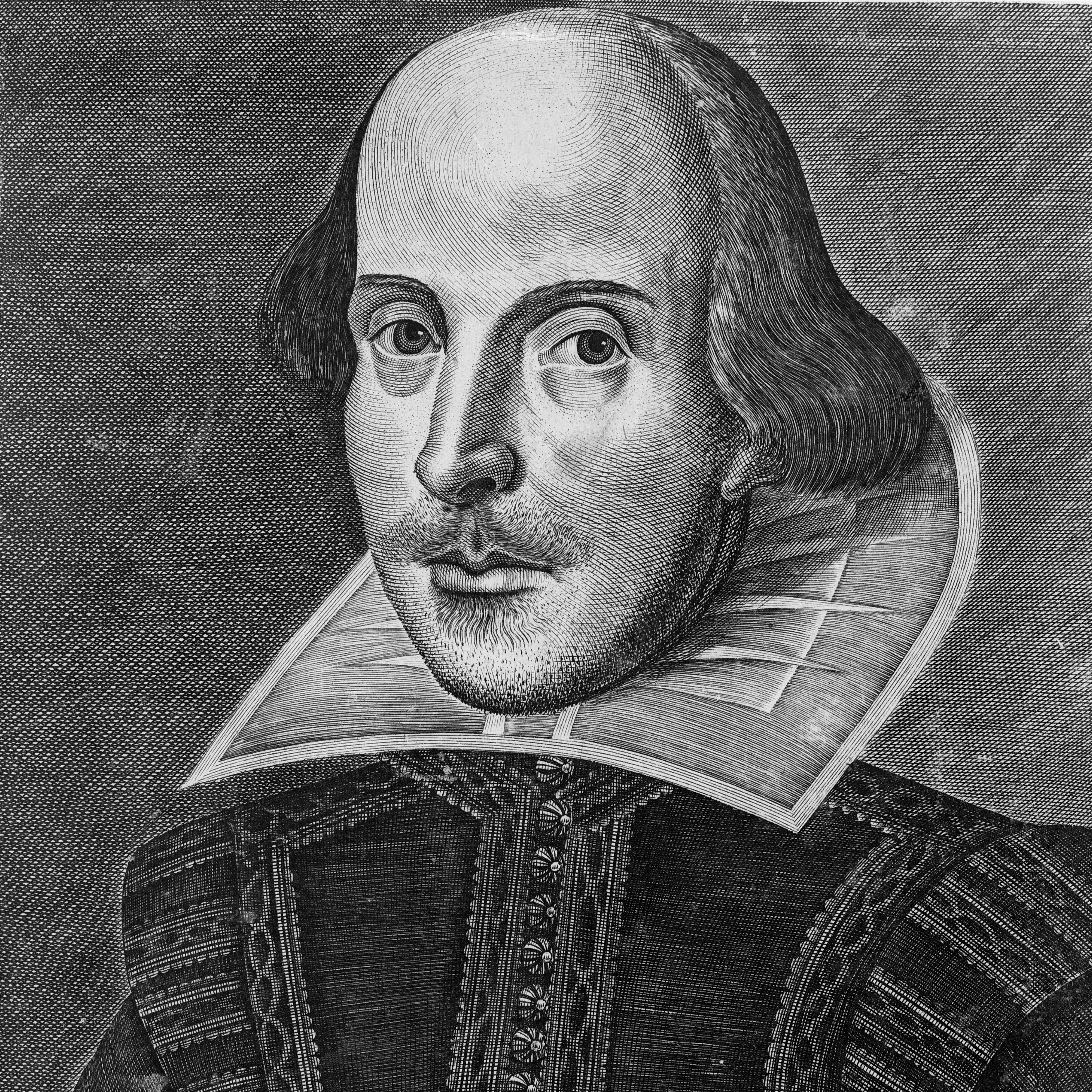
In the play Henry VI, William Shakespeare uses the term "walloon" to refer to the Walloon region.

The Walloon language is therefore considered a regional Romance language, found in the Romance-speaking areas of the Netherlands. This definition is echoed in English in the Oxford Dictionary and in William Shakespeare's Henry VI (Part I). Shakespeare uses the term Walloon to refer to the Walloon region: "Lord Regent, and redoubted Burgundy, By whose approach the regions of Artois, Walloon and Picardy are friends to us" (Henry VI, Part I, Act 2, Scene 2). A note specifies: "At that time, the Walloons were the inhabitants of the territory now located to the south of Belgium, still known as the 'Pays Wallon.'"

In addition to this general meaning of regional dialects, some contemporary authors of Jean Lemaire de Belges distinguished Walloon, though they could not precisely define its geographic area, from other d'oïl dialects. This is the case with Henri Estienne, who marks the relationship between Picard and Walloon: "If it were not for the inconvenience of this pronunciation, it is certain that the language of the Picards, including the Walloons, would be a dialect that could enrich our French language." Claude Fauchet treats Walloon as a rustic Romance language, stemming from the old d'oïl language. Likewise, Pierre de Ronsard considers Walloon and Picard as a single language: "Furthermore, I advise you not to hesitate to revive the ancient words, especially those of the Walloon and Picard language, which remain to us as the naive example of the French language, I mean that which was in use after Latin was no longer spoken in our Gaul..."

==== 'Oïl' and 'Burgundian' meanings ====
By the 16th century, Wallon was no longer limited to local authors from the Netherlands. In 1530, the English linguist John Palsgrave referred to Wallon in his Esclaircissement de la langue françoyse as the French spoken in the Burgundian Netherlands. Similarly, the Spanish historiographer Juan Cristóbal Calvete de Estrella (1520–1593) noted the differences between Parisian French and lengua Valona, though he viewed the latter as a variant of French, albeit an archaic or corrupted one. (Note: La lengua communente es Francesa, aunque tambien hablan Flamenco. Pero no es tan un elegante y pulida como la, que se habla en Paris, y Francia, sinon antigua y Romana corrompida, que llamen Walona. De la qual usan en Henao, Cambresis, Artoes, Namur, Lieja, y en aquella parte de Brabante, que llaman Romana, o Gallica [...] Brabante gallica, donde es Niuela, y en Henao, que es por alli comarcana a Brabante, donde es Bins y otros lugares The common language is French, although they also speak Flemish. But it is not as elegant and polished as the one spoken in Paris and France, but ancient and corrupted Roman, which they call Walloon. Of which they use in Henao, Cambresis, Artoes, Namur, Liege, and in that part of Brabant, which they call Romana, or Gallica [...] Brabant gallica, where is Niuela, and in Henao, which is by there comarcana to Brabant, where is Bins and other places. Henry 1990, pp. 101–102)

At this time, Wallon broadly referred to the Romance language spoken in regions bordering Germanic languages.

Albert Henry provides the example of Ambroise Paré, who, in his Voyage de Metz (1552), describes an Italian captain present at the siege of Metz. This captain spoke fluent German, Spanish, and Walloon, along with his native tongue.

But Henry, quoting Maurice Bossard, extends this linguistic boundary even further, reaching Switzerland through texts from the Montbéliard region. He also references Genevan François Bonivard, who used wallon and language wallon to refer to the "French spoken in territories bordering German-speaking areas," the "French of Swiss Romandy," and even the "Franco-Provençal dialect of the Valais," ultimately including the broader category of roman. According to them, this usage originated from the works of Jean Lemaire de Belges and ceased to appear in Bonivard's writings after 1551. Despite this, they note that the term persisted in scientific language until the early 20th century, as evidenced by the Grammaire du patois wallon du canton de La Poutroye by Abbé Simon, published in Paris in 1900.

Regarding the Burgundian interpretation of the term, which is based on the geographical expanse of the Burgundian Netherlands, it remained in use into the 17th century. Louis de Haynin, Seigneur du Cornet, wrote:

Belgium, as it stands today, is a vast country between France, Germany, and the Ocean Sea [...] It is generally divided into two almost equal regions, namely Walloon Belgium and German or Flemish Belgium, according to some. Walloon Belgium includes the provinces of Artois, Lille, Douai, and Orchies, otherwise called Gaulish or Walloon Flanders; Cambresis, Tournesis, Hainaut, and the State of Valenciennes, Namur, Lothier or Walloon Brabant, Luxembourg, and Liège.

This understanding persisted into the 20th century, though less in everyday use and more in encyclopedias. This is evident in the 1963 Larousse du XXe siècle, which defines Wallons as the population of the southeastern half of Belgium (excluding the Arlon district in Belgian Luxembourg), extending into neighboring French departments such as Nord, Aisne, and Ardennes. The same description applied to the Walloon dialect.

Jules Feller, cited by Henry, though without confirmation, wrote in 1920 that:

Even today, not only the population of French-speaking Belgium but also beyond our borders, in French Flanders—Lille, Douai, Arras, Valenciennes, Cambrai, Avesnes—as well as in Thiérache, Rethelois, and Ardennes, identify as Walloons and declare that they speak Walloon.

Nonetheless, Albert Henry concludes that by 1963, the Burgundian meaning described by Feller had fallen out of use, and the term Wallons now simply refers to the inhabitants of Wallonia.

==== Wallon and Roman ====
Albert Henry compiled a collection of documents demonstrating that the term wallon was historically equivalent to roman, though the latter predates the former. He cites examples such as Brabant wallon and Flandre wallonne, which only replaced terms like Roman Pays de Brabant, Roman Brabant, or Flandre gallicane starting in the 17th century. Conversely, he points to the Roman-speaking regions of the Duchy of Luxembourg (Roman Pays de Luxembourg) and the Gaume region (Romance Terre), which retained their Roman designations as part of the Electorate of Trier.

==== The Error of Étienne Pasquier ====
For a long time, it was believed that the term Wallon derived from Gaulois because, according to early scholars like Étienne Pasquier, the Latins were unable to pronounce the G in Gaulois. This mistake by Pasquier likely inspired Jean Bodin when he created a famous anecdote involving a pun: "Où allons-nous ?/Wallons-nous ?" He writes:

It is probably from Pasquier that Jean Bodin drew inspiration when he wrote this learned etymological anecdote, already noted by Stengers in 1948: "Ouallonnes enim a Belgis appelamur [we, the "Gauls"], quod Gallis veteribus contigit, quum orbem terrarum peragrarent, ac mutuo interrogantes quaererent ou allons-nous, id est quonam proficiscimur? ex eo credibile est Ouallones appellatos quod Latini sua lingua nunquam efferunt, sed g lettera utuntur.' P. Mesnard, in his 1941 translation of the definitive 1572 edition, renders this passage in French: "We are called Wallons by the Belgians, because it happened that the ancient Gauls, as they traveled the world, would ask one another 'Where are we going?' meaning, 'To what place are we heading?' And it is probable that they derived the name Ouallons from this, which the Latins could not pronounce without altering it by using the letter G.

— Henry 1990, p. 112

The pun on words "Wallons-nous?" is still used today, as the title of a cultural program (Walloon language) on RTBF, Wallons-nous, as the name of a Walloon non-profit organization organizing cultural trips.

=== Wallon in the 17th century ===
During the 17th century, the semantic content of the term wallon evolved little, but distinctions between the French language and Walloon speech became increasingly clear. Albert Henry cites Dominique Bouhours, who observed that "a Dutchman might well confuse French with Walloon" when referring to Erasmus, who had criticized the French language. However, Henry notes that it is often difficult to discern whether wallon refers to a clearly defined dialect or simply a highly regionalized form of French.

==== Specific uses ====
At the same time, wallon began to appear in various other contexts, even crossing into other languages.

Walloon Guards

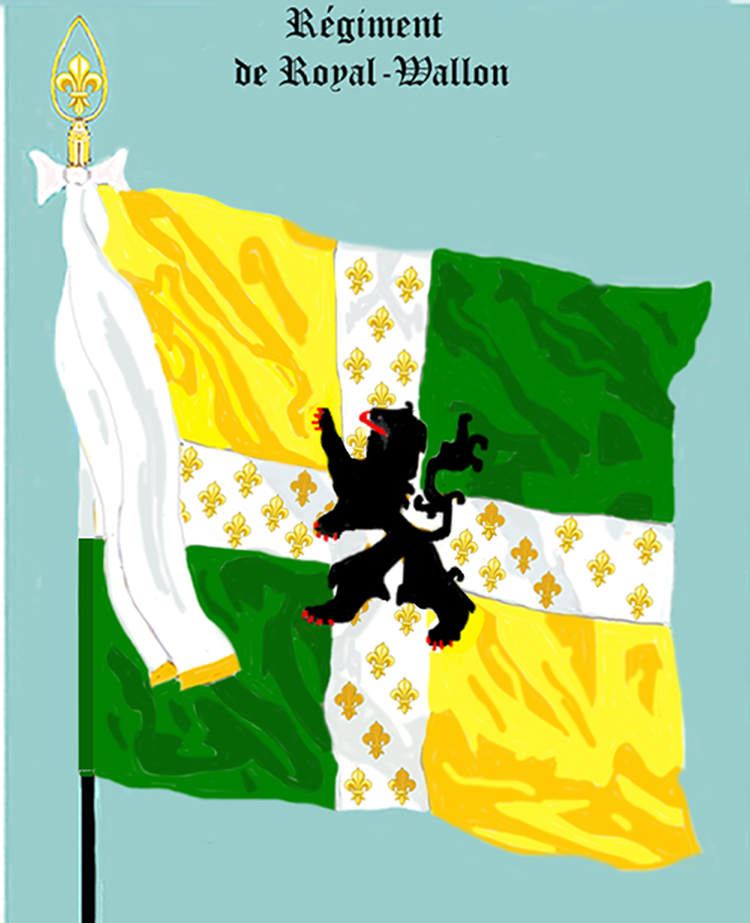
Orderly flag of the Royal-Wallon Regiment, in the service of the King of France.

The "Walloon infantries" of Charles V, descendants of the "Walloon companies" raised by the Dukes of Burgundy primarily in the French-speaking Netherlands, gained a reputation for excellence that made the term wallon known throughout Europe and even in the New World. These elite units, incorporated into the royal guard, played a crucial role in Spain's defense, to the point that Gaspar de Guzmán remarked, "The security of Spain depends entirely on the presence of these Vallones."

One of the earliest mentions of the Walloon Guards, though unflattering, comes from Pierre Pithou in his Satire Ménipée.

In contrast, Bossuet offered a more honorable tribute in his Funeral Oration for the Prince of Condé: "The enemy army is stronger, it is true; it is composed of those veteran Walloon, Italian, and Spanish bands that no one had ever managed to break."

The military use of wallon persisted for centuries. The "Walloon Guards Regiment" served Austria throughout the 18th century and Spain until 1822. The épée wallonne—a straight, broad, double-edged sword and precursor to the cavalry saber—was used by several armies, notably French cavalry under Louis XIII and Louis XIV. Walloon regiments also served the Dutch Republic from the 17th to the 18th century.

Walloon church

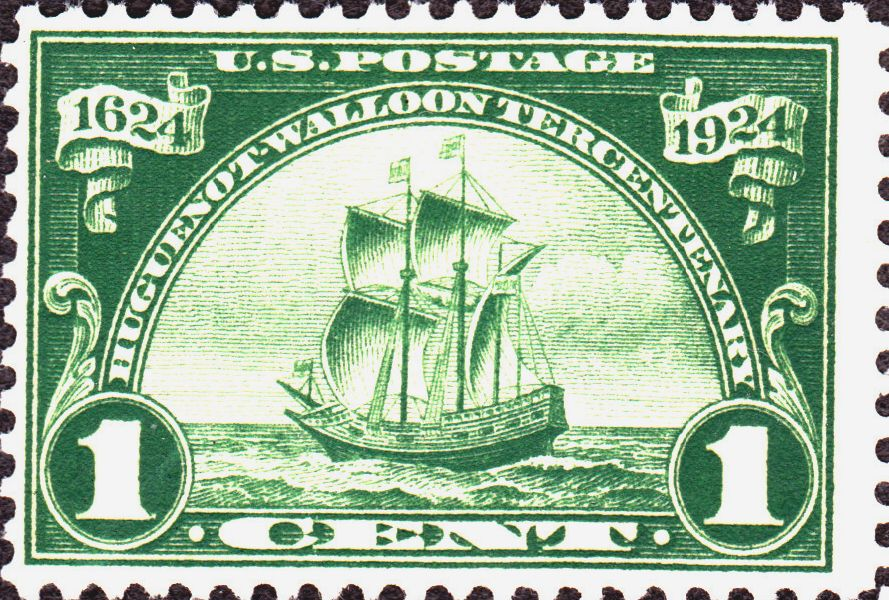
Stamp commemorating the arrival of the Huguenots and Walloons in America.

Calvinists from the Southern Netherlands fled religious wars and settled abroad, particularly in the Dutch Republic and its colonies (as well as in England and Germany). There, they were known as Walloon Reformed (Waalse hervormden) and established Walloon Churches (Waalse kerken).

Walloons in New York

Some Walloon Protestant refugees settled in the New World, particularly in New Belgium with New Amsterdam, which would later become New York City. While the name Wall Street (meaning "street of the wall" in English) refers to the existence of a single wall where the current street stands, the maps of New Amsterdam show two different names for this street. De Waal Straat (its Dutch name) does not refer to a wall, but rather to a significant group of Walloon settlers who contributed to the founding of New Belgium and then New Amsterdam, as the Dutch word for a Walloon is Waal. Around 1630, the total population of New Netherland was about 300 people, a majority of whom were Walloons. Wallabout Bay, located north of Brooklyn, derives its name from a distortion of the Dutch Waal bocht, meaning "Walloon Bay." This name was chosen because several Walloon families had settled in the area.

Walloons of Sweden

Due to economic difficulties and religious wars, between five and ten thousand people from the southeastern Southern Netherlands, the Principality of Liège, and Lorraine emigrated to Sweden under the leadership of Louis De Geer to work in the iron industry. The Swedes refer to them as Valloner.

The Spanish Valona

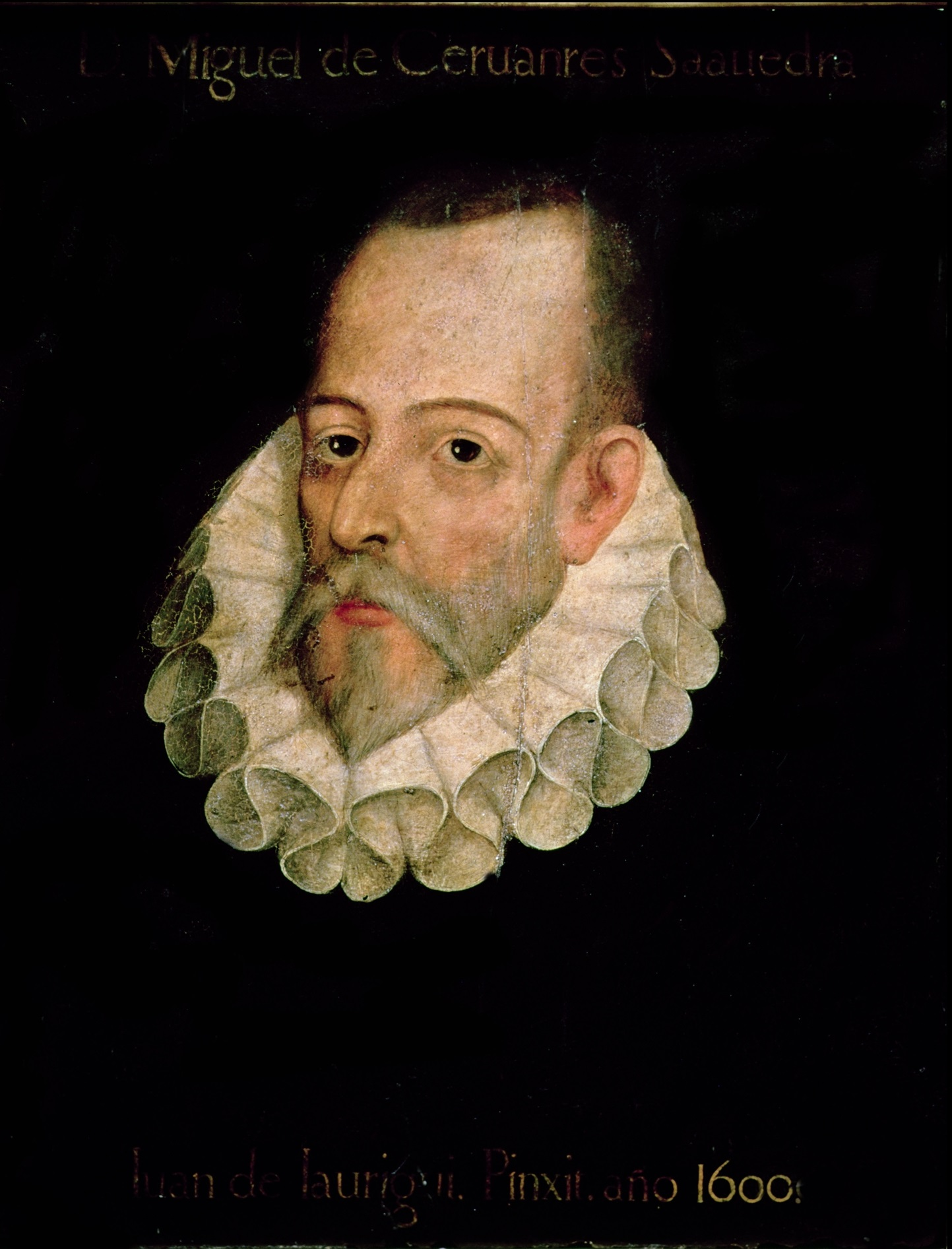
Supposed portrait of Cervantes.

Due to the importance and prestige of the Walloon Guards in Spain, the term wallon was quickly borrowed into the Spanish language, even by Miguel de Cervantes himself.

In his book Histoire des mots Wallon et Wallonie, Albert Henry lists numerous instances of the term valón and its derivatives in Cervantes' works, particularly in Don Quixote and Rinconete et Cortadillo:

In Spain, the linguistic borrowing most strikingly demonstrates the renown of the Walloon regiments. In the second part of Don Quixote and in some of his Exemplary Novels, Cervantes, a connoisseur of all the nuances of his language, even the newest, uses the noun valona, referring to a particular shirt collar or lace ruff, as well as valones, a type of trousers, and the phrase a la valona, describing either these trousers or a way of arranging feathers on a hat: a la valona—'in the Walloon style,' meaning 'in the style of the soldiers of the Walloon regiments,' rather than 'in the manner of the Walloons.'

=== Walloon in the 18th century ===
To illustrate the usage of the term wallon in the 18th century, Albert Henry cites the account of an English historian of the time. According to Henry, James Shaw made an error regarding the origin of wallon, but he correctly identified its linguistic distinction:

There is a truly remarkable distinction within the provinces of the Austrian Netherlands. Some are Flemish, while others are called Walloon Provinces. This distinction arises from the difference in language. The Walloon language, spoken in the provinces bearing this name, differs significantly from the Flemish spoken in the other provinces. The ancient French language emerged from the ruins of Latin under Charlemagne and was spoken in both France and the Walloon provinces in the centuries following his reign. This old language was called Romance or Gaulish, and the name Wallon derives from it. Through gradual refinement, France purified this old Gaulish into the softer and more elegant language spoken in the kingdom today. However, the Walloon provinces of the Netherlands retained their older, harsher, but more vigorous and energetic language. The counties of Hainaut and Namur make up the Walloon lands, along with Artois, which is no longer an Austrian province. The name and language of Walloon also extend to part of the neighboring provinces. The portion of Brabant bordering Hainaut and Namur is called Walloon Brabant. Language similarities have often played a significant role. During the wars ignited by the tyranny of Philip II, the Walloon provinces, more attached to the old religion, were the first to separate from the other provinces, accept the proposals of the Prince of Parma, and reconcile with Spain. The Walloon troops, recruited from regions less dominated by commerce and frequently serving as the theater of war near France, gained renown for their martial spirit and formed the elite of the armies of Philip and his descendants.

==== Walloons and Liégeois ====
The distinction between Walloons and Liégeois, first noted by Jean de Haynin around 1470, persisted until the end of the 18th century. This distinction was studied by Jean Stengers in an article that Albert Henry considers decisive. Regarding this distinction, Henry cites several 17th-century sources, including the Spaniard Alonso Vázquez, Father Louis Hennepin in 1697, and Braunius in 1700. In the Dictionnaire de Trévoux (1752), Wallon, -onne is defined as: "Meaning Gaulish, referring to all the peoples of the Netherlands whose native language is an old form of French: such as those from Artois, Hainaut, Namur, Luxembourg, and parts of Flanders and Brabant." Dom Jean François provides a similar definition in his Dictionnaire roman of 1777.

Based on Stengers' research, Henry asserts that before 1770, "there is not a single concrete instance of Walloon being used to refer to both the 'Burgundians' and the 'Principautaires' simultaneously. The distinction appears primarily in documents that view matters from outside the Southern Netherlands and the Principality of Liège."

However, when the term wallon refers solely to language, it is not excluded for the Liégeois, even by themselves. Wallon and langue wallonne appear in numerous texts from the 16th to 18th centuries, including those written by Liégeois, to refer to regional French or the local dialect. In the 17th century, the principality even institutionally distinguished its "Walloon towns" from its "Thiois towns."

=== Walloon in the 19th century ===
The period of the French Republic and Empire, followed by the United Kingdom of the Netherlands, and finally, the independence of Belgium, profoundly changed the political and linguistic environment of the former Austrian Netherlands. These shifts had significant repercussions on the semantics of the term Wallon (Walloon), alongside the increasingly precise specification of regional dialects.

==== The Belgian definition ====
With the independence of Belgium in 1830, the meaning of Wallon became increasingly defined concerning the newly formed state. Older meanings became obsolete and were relegated to historical expressions.

The concept of Wallonia emerged in the second half of the 19th century and became prominent with the political assertions of the Walloon Movement. As Albert Henry noted, Wallons began to symbolize: "Men born in Wallonia, who live there or, having emigrated to Brussels as adults, continue to have the consciousness and desire to remain, sentimentally and culturally, what they were."

The term Wallons was then used in opposition to Flemands (Flemings), reflecting the linguistic divide within Belgium.

==== Dialectal clarifications ====
During the 19th century, the dialectological meaning of Wallon became more defined, though not without confusion. Linguists, as Henry acknowledged, often found it difficult to discern whether the term Wallon in older texts referred to a dialect or a regionalized form of French. Moreover, it was unclear whether authors of the time were aware of distinct linguistic realities. However, Henry pointed out that certain authors discussed the dialectal reality, such as Henri Estienne, Claude Fauchet, and Pierre de Ronsard.

The dialectal sense of Wallon is also documented in the 18th century, for example: Une Pasquée wallonne (a piece written in Liège patois) from 1753. A work from 1763 written in honor of Prince-Bishop Charles-Nicolas d'Oultremont, where walon is presented alongside German, French, and tîhon (a Low German dialect).

By the late 18th century, amateur lexicographers and philologists of Old French began to recognize the need for more specific terminology for all dialects. German philologists were the first to clarify the issue, while Belgian and French scholars were slower to recognize these dialectal distinctions. One of the first significant distinctions came from the German philologist Wilhelm Altenburg, who clarified that the Walloon dialect could not be limited to the Liège region nor extended to the Picard-speaking areas.

In 1866, Joseph Dejardin similarly confined Wallon to the dialects of the provinces of Liège, Namur, and Luxembourg. In 1892, Jules Simon mapped out the "Walloon Quadrilateral" with isoglosses that delineated the transition zone between Walloon and Picard dialects. This marked the final semantic narrowing of the term Wallon and Wallonia, now referring more specifically to dialectal reality, though still holding a broader political meaning within Belgium's linguistic divide.

== Toponymic Derivatives ==
=== The Walloon Provinces and Walonia in the 16th century ===
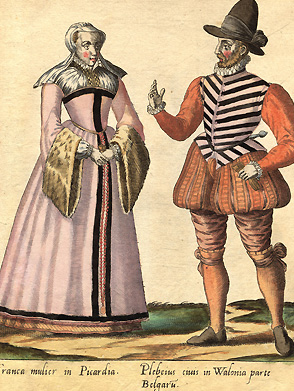
Plebeius civis in Walonia parte Belgarum

Albert Henry suggests that from the 16th century, the term Walloon Provinces occasionally took on political connotations, referring to the French-speaking community within the Netherlands, contrasting with the Thiois provinces (Dutch-speaking regions). For instance, Thierri d'Offegnies, a deputy from Hainaut, mentioned a "special league between the Walloon provinces" in a report to the States General.

Jean Germain highlights the appearance of the term Walonia in a 1581 engraving attributed to Jean-Jacques Boissard, (Note: Other sources attribute it to Abraham de Bruyn, like the Plantin-Moretus Museum in Antwerp.) which depicts regional costumes of the time. The engraving shows a plebeius civis in Walonia parte Belgarum (a common citizen from Walonia in the Belgian territories) alongside a Mulier Lotharinga (a woman from Lorraine), a Mulieris in Hannonia gentilis habitus (a woman from Hainaut), and a Franca mulier in Picardia (a French woman from Picardy). However, Germain questions the precise meaning and location of Walonia:

It is already interesting to note that in Walonia parte Belgarum is contrasted, or at least distinct, from Hannonia and Picardia. Should we see in this terminological difference an opposition? Or, considering the image shows only one man in contrast to the three women, can we conclude that in Walonia parte Belgarum encompasses, in its sense, Hainaut, Picardy, and—more surprisingly—Lorraine?

=== Territorial organization of religious orders in the 17th century ===
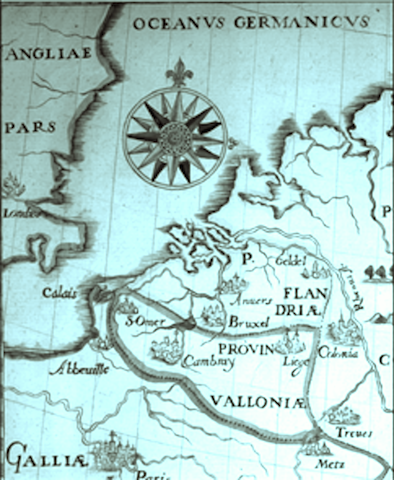
Map of the Provincia Walloniae of the Capuchins.

In the 17th century, the ecclesiastical provinces were reorganized, and new dioceses were created in the Low Countries. The papal constitution took into account not only the boundaries of the political provinces but also the language of the populations. As a result, several religious orders established distinct provinces that diverged from the political provinces and referred to the region as romane de gallo-belgique, gallo-belge, and later, wallo-belge or wallo-belgique. The term Wallonia, with various spellings, emerged during this ecclesiastical reorganization.

For example, the Capuchin order created a Provincia Walloniae or Wallonica as early as 1616, with evidence of this designation in 1618 and 1622. The Romanist Jean Germain studied several of their maps in a scientific article titled La préhistoire 'latine' du mot Wallonie.

These maps, collected by Julien Lambert, a historian from Liège, show that the Capuchins used the terms Wallonia/Vallonia or wallonica/vallonica. The geographic extent of the province varied across different maps. The terms appeared only in Latin, and there is no evidence that an equivalent term existed in the Romance language, although Jean Germain speculated about a growing awareness of a shared cultural or linguistic identity, a notion also supported by Walloon activists like José Fontaine.

=== Walloon Provinces and the "Pays Wallon" ===
Before the term Wallonie came into use to designate the Romance-speaking regions of the Southern Netherlands or Belgium, phrases like pays wallon or terre wallonne were used. Albert Henry identified two expressions: provinces wallonnes (used as early as the 16th century) and pays wallon (more rarely attested before the 18th century). (Note: Examples of the use of the term pays wallon during this period: Damiens de Gomicourt, Auguste-Pierre (1783). Le voyageur dans les Pays-Bas autrichiens [The traveler in the Austrian Netherlands] (in French). Vol. III. p. 115. "most farms in the Walloon region are abbey farms..."; Paquot, Jean Noël (1764). Mémoires pour servir à l'histoire littéraire des dix-sept provinces [Memoirs to serve the literary history of the seventeen provinces] (in French). Vol. III. p. 263. "The author states in his preface, dated September 14, 1529, that he had scoured almost all the libraries in the Walloon region (Gallo-Germaniam) to find the material for his work."; Bentivoglio, Cardinal (1770). Histoire des guerres de Flandre [History of the Flanders wars] (in French). Vol. II. Paris: Desaint. pp. 341–342. "In fact, some of our provinces speak the French language. They follow the customs of this neighboring nation. The Walloon country and half of the province of Flanders are better known as Gallican country than by their own name."; Dine, E. J (1791). Mémoire historique et pièces justificatives pour M. Vander Meersch [Historical memoir and supporting documents for Mr Vander Meersch] (in French). Vol. I. Lille: Jacquez. p. 320. "We must do justice to the Walloon flatlands of Brabant, Hainaut and above all Namur: the peasants, who have no representatives other than the nobles, whose interests are diametrically opposed, already feel the full weight of their future burden.") These terms referred to a territory larger than what would later be recognized as the Belgique romane or Romance-speaking Belgium. The use of these expressions merged with the notion of Belgique romane during the French Republic and Empire, as well as under the United Kingdom of the Netherlands, becoming more common after Belgium's independence. For instance, Jules Michelet used pays wallon in a historical context:

What is more French than this pays wallon? It must be so for, there, amidst the fiercest battle of races and languages, amidst the clang of forges and armories, our ancient melodic genius shines forth in its purest charm.

=== Walloon immigration ===
In the United States, there is a small region in Wisconsin, around Green Bay, where Walloon is spoken due to significant emigration from Wallonia in the 19th century. Several localities in Wisconsin retain traces of this immigration in their names, such as Walloon Lake in Michigan, named after the Walloon settlers who arrived in the 19th century.

=== Birth of the term Wallonie ===
The first recognized (Note: Recognized by Albert Henry. For reference, there is a mention of Wallonie dating from 1825: "The Germans, on the other hand, reserving the noble name of Franks for themselves, obstinately refused to see Franks in Gaul, which they disdainfully called Wallonie, the land of the Walloons or the Welsches." (Thierry, Augustin (1825). Histoire de la conquête de l'Angleterre par les Normands [History of the Norman Conquest of England] (in French). Vol. 1. Paris: Éd. Firmin Didot. p. 155.)) mention of the term Wallonie appeared in November 1842 in the Essai d'étymologie philosophique by the philologist and anthropologist from Namur, Abbé Honoré Chavée. The term was used to refer to the "Roman" world in contrast to the Germanic world. Chavée likely based his usage on the older meaning of the word wallon:

Renown (often unjustly) for a long time has had a voice to proclaim the preeminence of Germany in the field of philology, and does not repeat the great names that France, or, more accurately, Wallonia, can inscribe in the temple of scholarship.

According to Albert Henry, the term Wallonia is not directly linked to the Latin Wallonia: "It seems that this form Wallonia had no counterpart or descendants in the vernacular dialects." This view is supported by Jean Germain, who agreed that there is no direct relationship between this use of Wallonia and the Wallonie that emerged politically and culturally in the 19th century in the context of the newly formed Belgian state.

In 1844, the same term was used to refer to Wallonia, which Albert Henry, a Walloon activist, considered the true meaning. François-Charles-Joseph Grandgagnage, a writer and magistrate from Namur, used the term twice in his article Deux wallonades nouvelles par l'auteur d'Alfred Nicolas:

My dear Walloons, by all the Saints of Wallonia, I beg you; be yourselves; and when sonnets are written in Paris, make sure to do something else, precisely because they are written in Paris. They do not make tugboats there, (Note: Allusion to a poem composed in 1841 by Belgian author Théodore Weustenraad (Le Remorqueur)) but I admit that sonnets, sonnets, the eternal sonnets, are infinitely easier.

[...] Well, indeed, here we are, swimming in the very waters of Wallonia. But I do not know; I feel an indefinable sensation. It is discomfort, sorrow, and sadness. It is an emotion that has no name in the language of humans. [...]

The word is written in two different spellings, which allows Henry to question the possible symbolism of the birth of the word. However, it designates "this time, more or less clearly, the Romance part of the young unitary Belgian state."

The term seems to have originated as a word used by philologists and historians, who employed it in journals like Revue de Liège or within the Société liégeoise de littérature wallonne. It remained primarily known in specialized circles, those of "philologists, historians, and regionalists, primarily from Namur and Liège." Nevertheless, Jean-Pol Hiernaux, within the framework of the Encyclopédie du Mouvement wallon, found instances of the word used outside of these circles. It wasn't until 1886 that the term gained some visibility, thanks to Albert Mockel: he adopted it as the title for his literary journal La Wallonie, launched that year in Liège. From that point onward, the word Wallonie came to designate "the Romance-speaking part of the young unitary Belgian state, south of the border that separates Flemish dialects from Romance dialects, from Ploegsteert to the Hertogenwald."

=== Wallonie: Concept of the Walloon Movement ===
Official flag of Wallonia inspired by the painting created in 1913 on the initiative of the Walloon Assembly.

With the linguistic divide and the rise of the Walloon Movement in Belgian politics, the term Wallonie took on a "conceptual and emotional" political dimension. According to Albert Henry, three key events shaped the latent consciousness of the Walloon movement, infusing the terms wallon and Wallonie with significance:

- 1912: The National Walloon Congress created the Walloon Assembly, and shortly after, Jules Destrée published Lettre au Roi sur la séparation de la Wallonie et de la Flandre (Letter to the King advocating for the separation of Wallonia and Flanders).
- 1940: During the German occupation, the Nazis followed the Flamenpolitik, repatriating Flemish prisoners to their families, while Walloon prisoners were held in camps.
- January 1961: Strikes, especially in the provinces of Liège and Hainaut, marked the first significant popular manifestation of Walloon political will.

=== Dialectal Wallonie ===
Walloon dialect in Romance Belgium.

With the narrowing of its meaning, the term Wallonie could refer to the Walloon dialect specifically, while still retaining its broader reference to Romance Belgium and the political and cultural identity of the Walloon movement. Linguists like Alphonse Maréchal, Charles Bruneau, and others, including the cartographers Elmer Bagby Atwood and Louis Remacle, helped delineate what Albert Henry called Wallonie dialectale. However, other linguists, such as Jules Feller and Joseph Dejardin, used the term Wallonie in a broader sense, long before its significant usage in the 20th-century Walloon movement.

=== Wallonne region ===
The linguistic divide reached a tipping point in the 1960s, culminating on December 31, 1970, when the Belgian Constitution was amended to establish not only communities but also regions, including the Région wallonne. Although the term Wallonie does not appear in the official texts, it has become commonly used to refer to this political and administrative entity, continuing to reference the "geo-social" concept promoted by the Walloon movement. For instance, the Union of Cities and Municipalities of Wallonia, an association funded by local authorities in the Walloon Region, uses this term.

The Walloon movement wanted to have the term Wallonie recognized in place of Région wallonne, as linguist Jean-Marie Klinkenberg proposed in an article in the journal Toudi in 1992: "And obviously, we would no longer talk about Région wallonne, but simply about Wallonie." This wish was partially realized politically; in 2010, the Walloon government adopted a guideline to promote the term "Wallonie" in place of Région wallonne to foster the "birth of a collective consciousness." The Walloon Parliament took the same measure with "Parlement de Wallonie" in September 2015. However, this is not recognized by the fundamental law of the Kingdom.

For some Walloon activists, such as François Perin, the term Wallonie refers to the French-speaking linguistic region rather than the official Région wallonne.

== Other members of the lexical family of Wallon ==
- Wallon(n)ade: A narrative in French verse, defined by Joseph Grandgagnage as a "small national poem, which seeks to celebrate our charming landscapes, but especially to awaken the beautiful and noble memories of the beloved homeland."
- Wallingant: "Formed on the model of flamingant, it refers to one who leads an active policy, primarily inspired by consideration for Wallonia and its interests." This led to the term Wallingantisme.
- Wallonner: An unused verb today meaning "to speak in a thick accent, like the Walloons", found in the Nouveau Larousse Universel of 1949 and other older dictionaries. Unknown in Belgium.
- Wallonisme: "A form or word specific to Walloon" in linguistic or philological terminology.
- Walloniser: "To give a Walloon ending or inflection (to French)."
- Walloniste: "Scholar, philologist in Belgium who studies Walloon dialects."

=== Meaning in the context of boatmen ===
In a "late note", Albert Henry suggests that in the 19th century up until World War II, the term wallon used as a noun was also used in the shipping industry to refer to "a wooden barge (oak and elm), without a keel, with a flat bottom and straight sides, which was reserved for inland navigation in the department of Nord, West Flanders, and Hainaut (?)."

== See also ==
- *Walhaz
- Walloons
- Walloon language
- Wallonia
- Religious reorganization of the Spanish Netherlands

== Bibliography ==
- Henry, Albert (1990). Histoire des mots Wallons et Wallonie [History of the words Walloons and Wallonie]. Notre histoire (in French). Mont-sur-Marchienne: Institut Jules Destrée.
- Germain, Jean (2007). "La pré-histoire « latine » du mot Wallonie" [The "Latin" pre-history of the word Wallonia]. Images et paysages mentaux des XIXe et XXe siècles de la Wallonie à l'Outre-Mer, Hommage au professeur Jean Pirotte à l'occasion de son éméritat [Images et paysages mentaux des XIXe et XXe siècles de la Wallonie à l'Outre-Mer, Hommage au professeur Jean Pirotte à l'occasion de son éméritat] (in French). Louvain-la-Neuve: Academia Bruylant, Presses Universitaires de l'UCL. pp. 35–48. ISBN 978-2-87209-857-6.
- Arnould, Maurice-Aurélien; Ruelle, Pierre; Hasquin, Hervé (1981). Hommages à la Wallonie : mélanges d'histoire, de littérature et de philologie [Tributes to Wallonia: mixtures of history, literature and philology] (in French). Brussels: Éd. Université de Bruxelles.
- Piron, Maurice (1964). "Note sur le sens de "wallon" dans Shakespeare" [A note on the meaning of "Walloon" in Shakespeare]. Bulletin de l'Académie royale de langue et littérature françaises (in French). 42. Brussels: 177–185.
- Hiernaux, Jean-Pol (2003). "Wallonie (histoire du mot)" [Wallonia (history of the word)]. Encyclopédie du Mouvement wallon [Encyclopedia of the Walloon Movement] (in French). Institut Jules Destrée.
- Hiernaux, Jean-Pol (2003a). "Wallonie (histoire du mot)" [Wallonia (history of the word)]. Encyclopédie du Mouvement wallon [Encyclopedia of the Walloon Movement] (in French). Institut Jules Destrée.
- Hiernaux, Jean-Pol (2003b). "Wallingant, wallingantisme" [Wallingant, wallingantism]. Encyclopédie du Mouvement wallon [Encyclopedia of the Walloon Movement] (in French). Institut Jules Destrée.
