= Religious reorganization of the Spanish Netherlands =

Catholic policies in the Spanish Netherlands

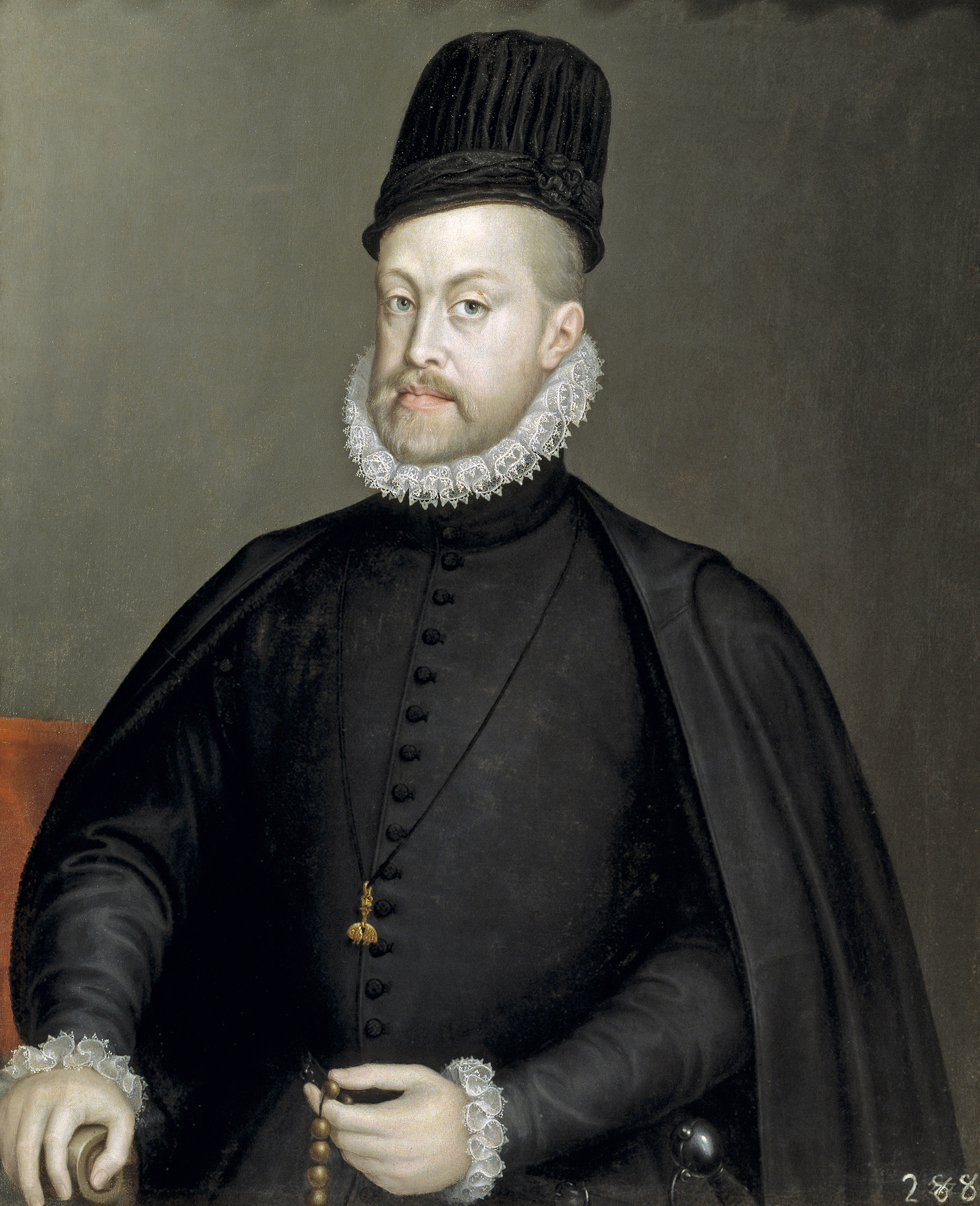
Philip II of Spain, ruler of the Spanish Netherlands during the reorganization

The religious reorganization of the Spanish Netherlands refers to the implementation of Catholic policies by religious and civil authorities in the Spanish Netherlands and the Principality of Liège as part of the Catholic Reformation following the Council of Trent. Central to this process was the establishment of new dioceses in the Spanish Netherlands, initiated by papal bulls in 1559 and 1561 at the request of Philip II. Nineteen dioceses replaced the previous five to enhance the independence of local religious authorities from neighboring states such as France and to position bishops closer to their clergy, improving the effectiveness of their evangelical mission. These bishops faced two main challenges: countering Calvinist iconoclastic violence in the Seventeen Provinces and implementing the decrees of the Council of Trent, which concluded in 1563.

During the same period, the Southern Netherlands saw the introduction and reorganization of religious orders such as the Jesuits and Capuchins, often supported by Spanish authorities. The Inquisition, previously restructured under Charles V, was also further reorganized to counter the spread of Protestantism.

This reorganization, aimed at ensuring both spiritual and political unity, instead contributed to increased conflict within the Southern Netherlands. Controversy arose over the selection and financial support of new bishops, alongside public fears that it signaled the introduction of the Spanish Inquisition. The ecclesiastical structure established during this period formally ended with the Treaty of Münster in 1648, which marked the political and religious division of Charles V's Seventeen Provinces.

== Background ==
Seventeen Provinces

Nicknamed the Conditor Belgii ("Unifier of the Netherlands") by Justus Lipsius, Duke Philip the Good politically united several formerly autonomous principalities in the Belgian Netherlands, laying the foundations of a centralized state. Emperor Charles V further consolidated nearly all of the Belgian Netherlands, with the exception of the Principality of Liège, through a series of acquisitions: Tournai in 1521; Friesland in 1523; Utrecht and Overijssel in 1528; Drenthe and Groningen in 1536; and the Duchy of Guelders and County of Zutphen in 1543. This unification was formalized with the creation of the Burgundian Circle in 1548 and the Pragmatic Sanction of 1549.

Unlike political organization, the religious structure remained largely unchanged since the Merovingian era, despite significant population growth. The territory of the Seventeen Provinces was divided among six bishoprics, only four of which—Cambrai, Tournai, Arras, and Utrecht—were truly local. Much of the region was under the authority of foreign dioceses, and these four native bishoprics were themselves subject to two foreign metropolitan sees: Cologne and Reims. In the Duchy of Brabant, spiritual authority was shared between the bishops of Liège and Cambrai, while the Duchy of Luxembourg was divided among six different prelates. This fragmented ecclesiastical organization had adverse political and religious effects:

It has rightly been said that the disadvantages of this arrangement were very serious; foreign bishops and their officers often permitted themselves abuses of power, to the detriment of the rights of citizens and national liberties, and even to the detriment of the prerogatives and dignity of the sovereign. On the other hand, those concerned in ecclesiastical cases had to appeal to distant courts located outside the country, a difficult and even dangerous recourse in times of war. But this state of affairs was even more detrimental to the interests of religion. The size of the dioceses (in that of Utrecht, there were nearly 1,100 churches and more than 200 walled towns) prevented bishops from properly overseeing and supervising their clergy. As a result, the clergy discharged their duties negligently, laxity set in among them, and this disorder encouraged the partisans of religious innovation.

Faced with a fragmented Catholic Church, Protestantism—particularly Calvinism—spread rapidly in regions such as Holland, Zeeland, Flanders, and Hainaut. Similar developments were occurring across Europe. In response, Pope Paul III convened the Council of Trent on December 13, 1545, to address the challenges posed by Martin Luther and other Protestant reformers.

== Reorganization of the secular clergy ==
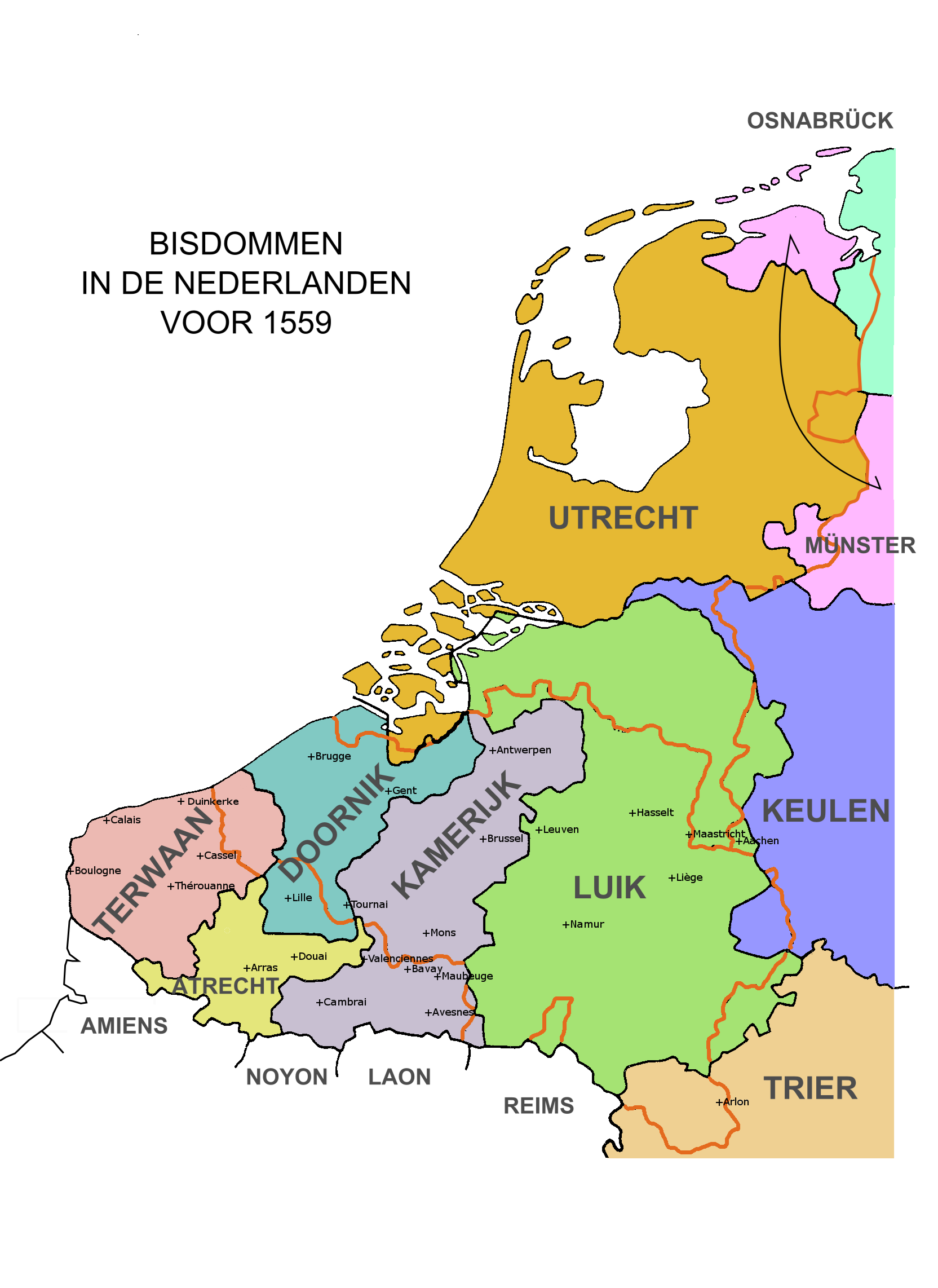
The bishoprics before their reorganization

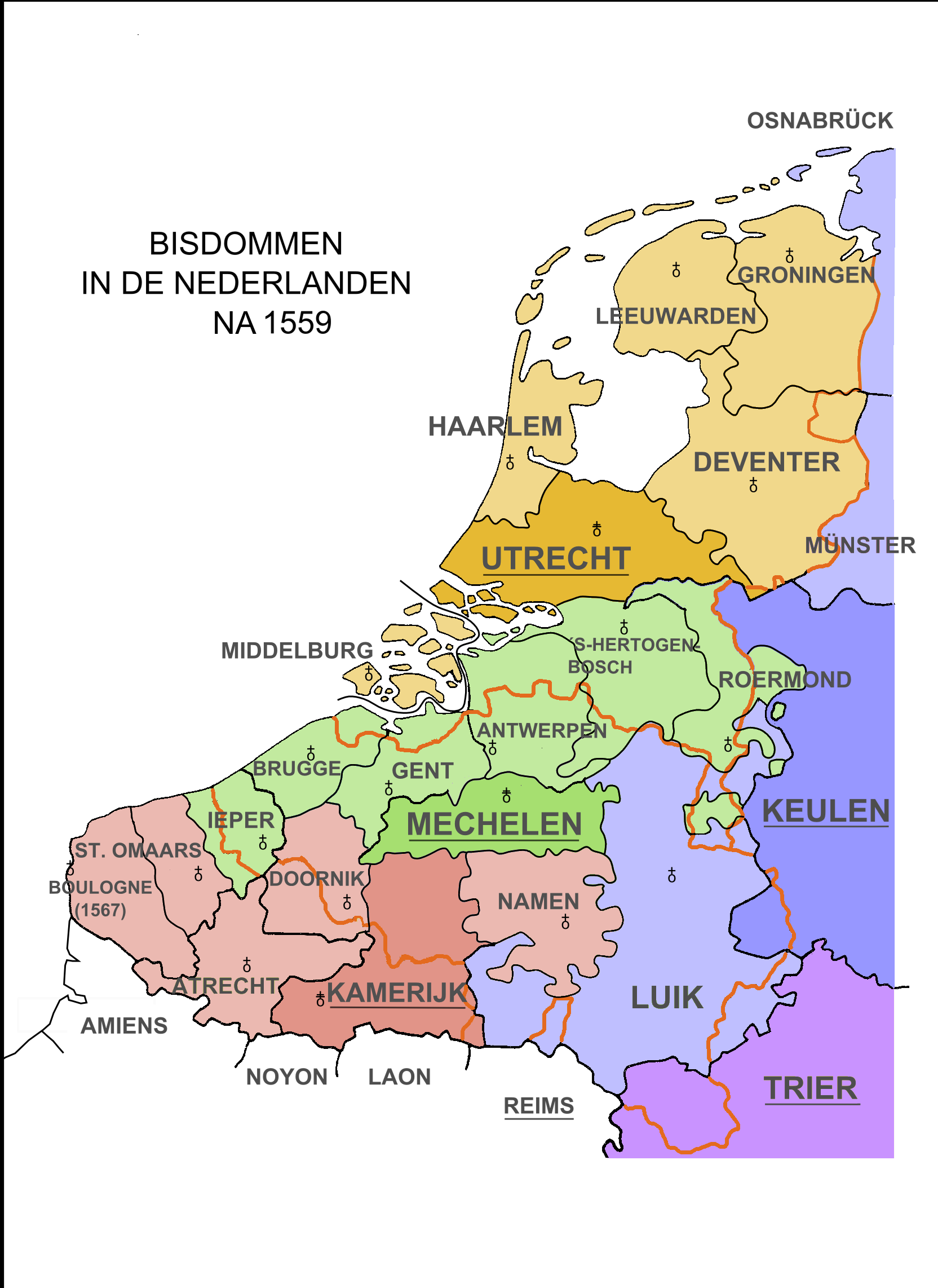
The bishoprics after their reorganization

=== Preparations ===
==== Secret commission ====
The decisions enshrined in the general bull of erection Super Universas were carefully and secretly prepared by a commission established by Philip II, tasked with devising a detailed plan for a new ecclesiastical division. To avoid arousing suspicion or resistance, this commission discreetly gathered extensive information on existing dioceses, including their geographic extent, distances between towns, population size, religious conditions, abbeys, prebends, and more. To advocate for the reorganization before the Roman Curia, Philip II sent the theologian François Van de Velde, commonly known as Sonnius. According to Michel Dierickx, three main reasons justified the reorganization: dioceses were too large for bishops to perform their pastoral duties; bishops, often Romance-language speakers, were ill-equipped to govern Germanic-speaking congregations; and the threat of heresy demanded a more active and localized pastoral presence.

==== Audiences in Rome and the bull ====
Sonnius departed the Belgian provinces on March 15, 1558, and arrived in Rome on May 13, 1558, where he secured an audience with Pope Paul IV. There, he presented a dire assessment of the Catholic situation in the Netherlands, arguing that the challenges facing the faith justified appointing new bishops who would be supported by doctors of theology or canon law. In response, the Pope appointed a commission of cardinals to whom Sonnius repeatedly presented the reorganization project. However, progress was slow due to repeated delays—initially because of the pope's poor health, as Paul IV was over eighty years old, and also due to political considerations. During the ongoing conflict between the Habsburgs and the Valois, the pope was reluctant to grant Philip II a reorganization that might diminish the territory of the French ecclesiastical provinces.

The Peace of Cateau-Cambrésis, signed on April 3, 1559, ended nearly fifty years of conflict and paved the way for Pope Paul IV to finalize the establishment of the new dioceses. On May 12, 1559, during a consistory attended by numerous bishops and Sonnius, the pope solemnly declared the creation of fourteen new dioceses. The preparation of the papal bull took additional time, partly due to the pope's ongoing health issues, but primarily because Sonnius sought to introduce new clauses. Ultimately, the general bull of erection Super universas was completed on July 31, 1559, though it bore the date of May 12, 1559—the day of the consistory.

From then on, three archiepiscopal sees replaced the previous single one, and fifteen suffragan bishoprics took the place of five, covering the entire territory of the Seventeen Provinces. This restructuring corrected the previous ecclesiastical boundaries that had ignored political borders, which had hindered effective governance. The new bishoprics were tasked with implementing the reforms decreed by the Council of Trent—through synods and regular visitations—to enhance pastoral care and combat heresy.

==== Papal commission ====
The erection bull Super universas included only general provisions about the boundaries and endowments of the new dioceses and did not specify the appointments of bishops for each see. To establish these precise boundaries and financial arrangements, Pope Paul IV appointed Salvatore Pacini, Bishop of Chiusi, as his legate to the Netherlands by a brief dated July 10, 1559. He also created a papal commission to assist Salvatore Pacini. This commission was composed of a small group of key figures: Granvelle, then Bishop of Arras; Viglius, President of the Council of State; Philippe Nigri, Chancellor of the Order of the Golden Fleece; and Michel Drieux (known as Driutius), dean of the collegiate church of Saint Peter in Leuven—who was later replaced after his death by Pierre de Corte, parish priest of the same church. Shortly afterward, Philip II added François Van de Velde (Sonnius) to these original commissioners.

On October 7, the papal legate granted the Commission of Five "the permission and authority to divide and delimit the provinces and dioceses, and to dismember, from convents and provostries, the endowments of the dioceses." For two years, from August 1559 to August 1561, this commission, working alongside political and religious authorities, meticulously and secretly defined the implementation details of this papal decision regarding diocesan reorganization. This reorganization involved three main aspects: territorial—by delineating the boundaries of each diocese; financial—by assigning endowments to archbishops and bishops; and hierarchical—by addressing the appointment processes for bishops and canons.

=== Territorial reorganization ===
For the creation of the new bishoprics, the Commission of Five, established by Pope Paul IV and Philip II of Spain, considered not only the diocesan boundaries but also those of the provinces and even areas south of the linguistic border. The papal bull of delimitation and endowment Ex Injuncto, dated March 11, 1561, established the boundaries of most dioceses, with the exception of the four dioceses in the northeast and the one in Ghent. In summary:

- The eastern part of the old diocese of Thérouanne was divided, according to the linguistic border, between the dioceses of Ypres and Saint-Omer;
- The former diocese of Tournai consisted of three archdeaconries:
  - The new diocese of Bruges roughly corresponds to the former archdeaconry of Bruges;
  - The diocese of Ghent corresponds to the former archdeaconry of Antwerp, with the part of the old diocese of Utrecht extending south of the county of Zeeland (which explains why the new diocese of Tournai retains the area between Kortrijk and Izegem in the Dutch-speaking region);
- The former diocese of Cambrai lost all of its Dutch-speaking territory to:
  - The archdiocese of Mechelen, which then included all the lands between the linguistic border and the archdeaconry of Antwerp, including part of the former diocese of Liège;
  - The diocese of Antwerp, composed of the archdeaconry of Antwerp and the northern Brabant area extending to the Meuse and detached from the old diocese of Liège;
- What remained of the Duchy of Brabant, except for a small eastern part attached to the diocese of Roermond, formed the diocese of Hertogenbosch, in addition to some territories south of the Waal like the Bommelerwaard and Heusden;
- The bishopric of Namur corresponded to the county of Namur and the Roman Païs;
- The diocese of Middelburg corresponded to the county of Zeeland;
- The diocese of Haarlem encompassed the part of the County of Holland north of Leiden. Consequently, except for the diocese of Tournai, the linguistic border divided the ecclesiastical provinces of Mechelen and Cambrai, while the river Waal served as the boundary between the ecclesiastical provinces of Mechelen and Utrecht.
- The diocese of Leeuwarden extended over the lordship of Friesland;
- The diocese of Groningen extended over the lordship of Groningen and the province of Drenthe;
- The diocese of Deventer comprised Overijssel and all of Gelderland north of Arnhem;
- The diocese of Roermond consisted of eight detached territories: Gelderland south of the Waal, the Land of Fauquemont, and a strip of Brabant territory.

=== Hierarchical reorganization ===
The bull Super universas established three archiepiscopal sees: Cambrai, Mechelen, and Utrecht, each with the obligation for the archbishop to visit his suffragan bishops. The archbishop of Cambrai had as suffragans the bishops of Arras, Saint-Omer, Tournai, and Namur. The archbishop of Mechelen oversaw the bishops of Ghent, Bruges, Ypres, Antwerp, 's-Hertogenbosch, and Roermond. The archbishop of Utrecht had under his jurisdiction the bishops of Haarlem, Middelburg, Deventer, Groningen, and Leeuwarden. Philip II's plan was fully realized except for the substitution of the archiepiscopal see of Cambrai in place of Arras.

The reorganization of bishopric appointments raised the question of who held the right to designate bishops: the pope or the king. Historically, the Dukes of Burgundy influenced bishop appointments in their territories, while Charles V and Francis I secured appointment rights in Spain and France, respectively. Charles V also claimed authority over the bishoprics of Tournai and Thérouanne after conquering them in 1521 and 1553, and imposed conditions on the Utrecht diocese to elect only his proposed candidates. The bishoprics of Arras and Cambrai, however, remained under papal appointment for over two centuries. Charles V's successor sought appointment rights over eighteen bishoprics, but the cardinals deferred the decision to the pope. Sonnius, citing canon law (jus patronatus acquiritur dote, aedificatione et fundo), argued that the king gained nomination rights by ceding diocesan territories and providing endowments, provided the allocated income remained unclaimed. Despite the pope's intent to limit this right to dioceses already under royal influence and retain authority over Cambrai, Mechelen, and Antwerp, the bull Super universas granted the king nomination rights over all sees except Cambrai, which remained under papal control. The condition was that appointees be doctors of theology, or doctors or licentiates in canon law.

During the period of bishopric appointments in the Netherlands, the selection of bishops was primarily guided by the recommendations of Viglius, Granvelle, and Margaret of Parma. With the notable exception of Granvelle's appointment as Archbishop of Mechelen, which historian Michel Dierickx deemed wholly suitable, the king's role was largely limited to approving candidates proposed by these influential figures from the Netherlands.

The papal bulls Ex injuncto and De statu Ecclesiarum, issued on March 11, 1561, outlined the structure for bishopric appointments and endowments in the Netherlands. These bulls mandated that each bishopric reserve ten chapter prebends: one for the bishop and nine for a council of canons. The nine canons were to consist of three doctors or licentiates in theology, three doctors or licentiates in law, and three nobles holding at least a licentiate in theology or law. This council would advise the bishop, with one jurist and one theologian among them designated as papal inquisitors.

=== Opposition ===
This reorganization clashed with jurisdictions and privileges, encountered considerable resistance, and proved incapable of managing a reform movement that had become increasingly significant. Territorial reorganization posed no problem; Michel Dierickx states:

At first glance, it is striking that neither the erection of new bishoprics nor their number—fourteen—were poorly received. In those times, when Protestantism had become a serious threat, many Catholics wholeheartedly approved of a fundamental reorganization of the hierarchy as a means of Catholic reform. [...] Nor was it the right—more precisely, the right of nomination by the king (since only the pope appoints bishops)—that provoked strong emotion.

The requirement in the papal bull that candidates for bishopric positions hold licentiate or doctoral degrees in theology or law sparked significant opposition, particularly among the nobility. Many noble families, accustomed to securing high ecclesiastical offices for their sons, were frustrated by this clause, as younger nobles attending universities often resisted obtaining formal degrees, viewing them as beneath their status. This academic prerequisite effectively excluded many nobles from the most prestigious and financially rewarding church positions. Historian Michel Dierickx argues that this clause was not intended to favor "commoners" over nobles, as suggested by Louis Rogier, but rather aligned with similar measures later adopted by the Council of Trent, predating them by a few years. Despite its intent, the Belgian government made repeated efforts to circumvent this academic requirement.

The primary source of opposition from the nobility to the reorganization of bishoprics in the Netherlands stemmed from the incorporation of three Brabantine abbeys into the dioceses of three Brabantine bishops. These abbeys, whose abbots traditionally held seats in the provincial States of Brabant, were significant because the Duchy of Brabant, the most autonomous province in the Belgian Netherlands, operated under the privileges of the Joyous Entry. The States served as the governing body of the duchy, enabling it to resist the centralizing policies of the King of Spain. By integrating these abbeys, three bishops appointed by the king would gain seats in the States, thereby increasing royal influence over Brabant's governance. This move was not only opposed by the nobility but also provoked strong objections from the monastic orders of the affected abbeys, as their monks traditionally elected their abbot, who oversaw both the religious life and the management of abbey properties.

The expansion of inquisitorial powers granted to bishops in the Netherlands raised significant concerns among the region's inhabitants, particularly in Antwerp, where the installation of a bishop was delayed, and in the northeastern provinces, which had been recently incorporated into Spanish control and where Lutheranism had gained a strong foothold. In these provinces, Governor Margaret of Parma, between 1563 and 1564, ceased efforts to appoint bishops due to widespread resistance from both the nobility and the general population, despite multiple unsuccessful attempts. Historian Michel Dierickx attributes this opposition primarily to a regionalist and provincial mindset, while also acknowledging the population's apprehension toward a more rigorous inquisition.

=== Implementation ===
The establishment of new bishoprics in the Netherlands commenced in 1561 with the diocese of Utrecht, where the installation process proceeded smoothly as a formality. Resistance was limited to the provost-archdeacons and the five Utrecht chapters, which experienced a significant loss of authority and financial privileges. A similar pattern occurred in the diocese of Middelburg, where Nicolaas de Castro was consecrated as bishop on December 26, 1561, and in the diocese of Haarlem, where Nicolaas van Nieuwland was appointed. In the County of Flanders, the installation of bishops also proceeded relatively smoothly: Rythovius was appointed bishop of Ypres, and Pierre de Corte became bishop of Bruges, though his appointment encountered some opposition from the Bishop of Tournai, who objected to the reduction of his diocese's boundaries.

== Inquisition ==
Under the Dukes of Burgundy, the Inquisition in the Netherlands experienced an initial phase of centralization, with jurisdiction over heresy cases primarily assigned to the Great Council of Mechelen. However, historian Aline Goosens notes that this centralization did not diminish the authority of local councils in addressing such matters. Goosens further observes that, prior to the reign of Charles V, the inquisitorial system in the former Netherlands possessed a distinctively Belgian character, setting it apart from practices in other regions:

Finally, the Great Council of Mechelen was the highest judicial authority in the country, along with the Privy Council. However, the Great Council handled appeals in heresy cases, not the Privy Council. In the sixteenth-century Netherlands, heresy was considered a reserved matter. We then find that the heretic was judged not by Inquisition courts but by secular justice, with inquisitors generally acting only as informants. Thus, in our regions, we had a truly original inquisitorial system.

During the early 16th century, Charles V, Holy Roman Emperor, modified public law prerogatives in the Netherlands, significantly reducing certain Church freedoms and limiting the authority of ecclesiastical courts. This shift led to tensions between local civic jurisdictions and religious tribunals. Ecclesiastical courts, or officialités, were primarily responsible for adjudicating religious matters and held authority over civil cases involving clergy. However, historian Aline Goosens notes that these courts often encroached upon the jurisdiction of aldermanic courts, issuing stricter judgments and appropriating confiscated goods and fines, which heightened conflicts with secular authorities.

The organization of new bishoprics (since 1559), tied to the introduction of the Inquisition, violated established rights and led to tyranny over people, their property, and even their consciences—responsibilities believed to be owed to God alone.

== Reorganization of the regular clergy ==
During the late 16th century, political and religious authorities in the Netherlands, including Governor Alexander Farnese and Laevinus Torrentius, the second bishop of Antwerp, strongly supported the introduction and reform of religious orders of the regular clergy, notably the Jesuits and Capuchins, to advance ecclesiastical and spiritual objectives.

=== Among the Jesuits ===
The Society of Jesus

The Society of Jesus, an order founded by Ignatius of Loyola and approved on The Society of Jesus, formally established by the papal bull Regimini militantis ecclesiae issued by Pope Paul III on September 27, 1540, began its activities in the Low Countries in 1542 with the founding of a house in Louvain. This establishment was initiated by students expelled from Paris due to the war between France and Spain, during which King Francis I ordered all subjects of Spain and the Holy Roman Empire to leave France under threat of death. A second Jesuit house was founded in Tournai in 1554. By 1556, the Jesuits sought legal recognition for their presence in the Spanish Netherlands, engaging in negotiations with the court of Philip II. In October 1555, Pedro de Ribadeneira was sent to Brussels to represent the order, supported by letters from its founder, Ignatius of Loyola. In a letter dated June 10, 1556, shortly before his death, Loyola expressed confidence in the order's mission to promote Catholic teachings in the region: "When divine goodness opens to us in Lower Germany the path that now seems blocked, we intend to send more Jesuits to the colleges. In this way, the fruit produced by the sowing of the word of God and the sacraments may be preserved and grow thanks to the solid and stable establishment of our men." Ignatius of Loyola, founder of the Society of Jesus, died on July 31, 1556. Three days later, on August 3, 1556, Pedro de Ribadeneira received verbal authorization from Philip II of Spain, allowing the Jesuits to establish their presence in the Netherlands. This timing led Ribadeneira and other Jesuits to attribute the approval to Ignatius's spiritual intercession.

In 1557, the Society of Jesus established the Province of Lower Germany, encompassing its three initial houses in Louvain, Tournai, and Cologne. The order subsequently expanded within this province, founding additional houses in the Spanish Netherlands and the Principality of Liège, including Dinant in 1562, and Antwerp and Cambrai in 1563. In 1564, James Lainez, successor to Ignatius of Loyola, created a separate Rhenish Province, splitting it from Lower Germany. The Province of Lower Germany, also referred to as the Province of Flanders, the Belgian Province, or the Province of Belgium, continued to include Jesuit houses in the Spanish Netherlands and the Principality of Liège. Over time, this province incorporated the Missions of Holland and England.

The Society of Jesus, commonly known as the Jesuits, rapidly gained prominence in the Low Countries during the late 16th and early 17th centuries. The order attracted numerous new members, supported by influential figures such as Luís de Zúñiga y Requesens and Alexander Farnese, and guided by Olivier Mannaerts, the Belgian Provincial. This growth prompted Claudio Acquaviva, the Superior General, to caution against admitting excessive numbers of novices. From eight members in Louvain in 1542, the order expanded to nearly 1,000 within seventy years. To manage this growth, the Jesuits established a vice-province with limited autonomy, encompassing the Meuse colleges of Dinant, Liège, Maastricht, Roermond, and 's-Hertogenbosch, as well as those in Luxembourg, Mons, and Valenciennes. However, this administrative structure was deemed ineffective due to the disproportionate number of houses relative to members.

At the Provincial Congregation held in Tournai the following year, an assembly of the Jesuit Province of Lower Germany that convened triennially, members nearly unanimously agreed to request a division of the province. The proposed division was based on linguistic differences rather than existing political or religious boundaries:

Already detached from the Rhenish Province in 1564, the Belgian Province had become so large that it had to be split in 1612. In establishing these jurisdictions, neither administrative nor political divisions were taken into account. Intended to act upon the people, the Society organized its structures according to the linguistic frontier that divided the country into two nearly equal parts. The entire Flemish region, both in the Netherlands and in the Principality of Liège, formed the Flandro-Belgian Province, while the Gallo-Belgian Province encompassed the Walloon region, to which the German districts of Luxembourg were attached.

Alfred Poncelet found in the Acts of the Congregation two reasons "discreetly intertwined" for this linguistic division. The first was easier administration of the Provinces; the other was the union of hearts and peace among the religious (sive gubernationis facilitatem... sive animorum unionem et pacem subditorum). Initially, the proposed names for the two new provinces were Upper Belgium and Lower Belgium, but the Superior General, fearing unpleasant associations with the adjective "lower," proposed instead to name them Flandro-Belgium and Gallo-Belgium. The latter would only begin to be called the "Walloon Province" ten years later, in 1622.

The number of new Jesuit vocations continued to increase during the early 17th century. By 1626, the Gallo-Belgian Province comprised approximately 1,600 Jesuits, including 773 members, eighteen colleges, two residences, and a house of probation in Tournai. The province reached a peak of 856 Jesuits in 1636. In the same year, the Flandro-Belgian Province counted 801 members, with sixteen colleges, four residences, one professed house, and a boarding school in Mechelen; this figure rose to 867 by 1643. Superior General Claudio Acquaviva described the two Belgian provinces as the "flower of the Society" (illae provinciae sunt et semper habui pro flore Societatis).

The linguistic division within the Jesuit organization was not universally accepted. In 1648, the States of Liège, with the backing of Louis XIV, sought to establish a separate Jesuit province for the Principality by appealing to Pope Innocent X. The request was unsuccessful, a result attributed by historian Jean-François Gilmont to local political tensions. Following the annexation of Artois and significant parts of Flanders and Hainaut by France—dividing the Belgian Jesuit provinces between two states—, Louis XIV attempted in 1682–1683 to integrate the Gallo-Belgian Province into the French Assistancy. He also sought to replace Flemish Jesuits in the annexed cities with Walloon counterparts. Despite pressure, including the expulsion of the Assistant from Rome and a ban on communication between the Gallo-Belgian Province and the Roman authorities, the Jesuits maintained their organizational integrity. A compromise was eventually reached, remaining in effect until the king's death: the Provincials of the Gallo-Belgian Province and the rectors of major institutions on French territory were required to be of French origin.

=== Among the Capuchins ===
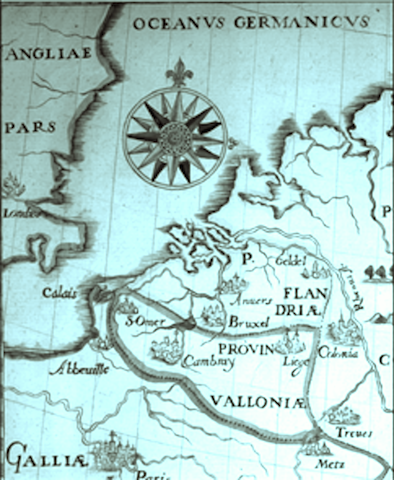
Map of the Provincia Walloniae of the Capuchins

Unlike the Jesuits, the Capuchin Friars Minor encountered no major obstacles in obtaining legal recognition in the Spanish Netherlands. The Spanish authorities actively supported the arrival of missionary orders and provided assistance to religious congregations engaged in the Catholic reconquest. The Capuchins arrived in the region in 1583, with four friars—three Flemish and one Italian—from the Paris Provincial House initially settling in Saint-Omer. They were soon transferred to Antwerp, a recently reconquered center of Protestant resistance. In September 1585, the friars met with Governor Alexander Farnese, who became a key supporter. The Italian friar, Félix of Lapedona, shared regional origins and military experience with Farnese, having also participated in the Battle of Lepanto. Farnese offered them protection and temporary accommodation near the Saint-Julien hospital in Antwerp, pending the allocation of land for a convent. On August 17, 1587, Philip II officially approved the foundation, and the Antwerp convent became an independent commissariat under the leadership of Father Hyppolite of Bergamo.

Like the Jesuits, the Capuchin order experienced rapid growth. By 1595, it had established 12 communities, expanding to 40 communities and 699 members by 1616. That same year, the Capuchins followed the example of the Jesuits by dividing the Belgian Province along linguistic lines, creating two separate provinces:

Impressed by the Jesuit example, the Capuchins decided in 1616 to divide their province according to the language of the populations, without respecting the borders of the Principality of Liège. The titles adopted by the new entities are closer to our sensibilities: Walloon Province (Provincia Walloniae) and Flemish Province. The Capuchins also used the term Gallo-Belgian Province, but less commonly than the Jesuits.

=== Among the Dominicans ===
The Order of Preachers, closely associated with the Inquisition, underwent a territorial reorganization under Charles V aimed at unifying the convents within the Spanish Netherlands. The convent of Lille was incorporated into the Province of Lower Germany in 1515. The convent of Liège, originally part of the Province of France since its foundation in the 13th century, joined the Province of Lower Germany in 1569 but returned to the French Province in 1580, where it remained until 1698.

== Historiographical considerations ==
The subject, particularly the establishment of the new dioceses, received limited scholarly and systematic attention until the second half of the 20th century. In 1967, Michel Dierickx observed:

It is surprising that, until just a few years ago, an event of such importance, both from a religious and political point of view, had never been the subject of a comprehensive study. This deficiency can be partly explained by the lack of sufficient detailed studies on the matter; the published studies concerned only about half of the new dioceses.

=== Dutch historiography ===
In Dutch historiography, the resistance of the United Provinces to the Spanish crown's reorganization of Catholic dioceses and the enforcement of the Inquisition is often portrayed as a reflection of the commitment to confessional freedom and religious tolerance within the Seventeen Provinces, particularly during the Dutch Golden Age. This tradition of tolerance has been characterized by some historians as a defining national trait and a driving force in Dutch history. However, the tendency to essentialize this narrative has led to the construction of a historical myth, prompting critical responses. While the Revolt of the Gueux is frequently interpreted as a triumph of tolerance, scholars such as Nicolette Mout argue that it can also be viewed as a defeat for religious tolerance.

The Dutch of the late 16th century drew on both the real and mythical past of the Belgic Netherlands to legitimize their resistance to the religious policies of the Habsburg monarchy. The Spanish initiative to introduce what the Dutch referred to—"with much effect but little accuracy," according to Benjamin Kaplan—, as the Spanish Inquisition was widely perceived as an infringement on spiritual autonomy, particularly because it involved gewetensdwang, or the regulation of individual conscience. Pamphlets published in 1579, for instance, appealed to the liberties guaranteed by the Joyous Entry of Brabant, in which the Duke of Brabant pledged not to subject the inhabitants to coercion "in any way," a phrase that was emphasized to affirm a right to freedom not only in property or person, but also in thought and conscience. Some contemporary writers framed the Revolt of the Gueux as a struggle for Liberty in the abstract, rather than for specific historical privileges. Jacques de Wesembeke, a propagandist for William the Silent, invoked the idea of an "ancient spiritual liberty" zealously defended by the people of the Belgic Netherlands.

=== Belgian historiography ===
According to Jean-Marie Lacrosse, who identifies as "rather unitarist," the emergence of the Belgian nation occurred during the Counter-Reformation, shaped simultaneously by unity and division. He attributes this development to the central role of the Catholic Church and religious orders, particularly the Jesuits, whose territorial organization both reflected and restructured earlier feudal subdivisions. These structures also aligned with the linguistic boundary, based on detailed censuses, to enhance the effectiveness of preaching. Lacrosse further observes that the Jesuits promoted bilingualism by teaching the other national language on each side of the linguistic divide—an aspect he considers essential for understanding subsequent declines in linguistic coexistence.

Henri Pirenne highlighted the significant impact of the Jesuits on the Belgian nation and its intellectual life, emphasizing their introduction and success in the Southern Netherlands:

Thus, even the highest manifestations of intellect in 17th-century Belgium bear the imprint of the Jesuits. More numerous in this country than anywhere else, nowhere did they exert as deep an influence on the nation.

=== Walloon historiography ===
Several figures associated with the Walloon movement have examined the religious reorganization within the Spanish Netherlands, often using it to support the concept of Wallonia or Walloon identity. Regarding the linguistic division of the two main religious orders in the region—the Jesuits and the Capuchins—Jean-François Gilmont, in a publication by the Walloon association Église-Wallonie, argued that a sense of Walloon unity emerged in this context:

The way religious men such as the Jesuits and Capuchins acted shows that pastoral concern pushed them to gather all those working in Wallonia, whether it depended on the King of Spain or the Prince-Bishop of Liège—not to mention other lesser princes. This unity, however, only emerges in the background and centrifugal tendencies often prevail. There are, above all, multiple Wallonias at that time.

In the same collective work, Omer Henrivaux argued that the adoption of a common catechism across the present-day Walloon regions, regardless of political circumstances, indicated their religious unity. However, he noted exceptions for Gaume and Tournai, a position challenged by the testimony of Abbé Pierre Dedoyart.

Philippe Destatte addresses the establishment of new dioceses and the organization of religious orders in his book L'identité wallonne, drawing notably on Jean-François Gilmont's concept of "a homogeneous Walloon whole" prior to the territorial changes under Louis XIV. This concept refers to the archdiocese of Cambrai, created in 1559, which united the dioceses of Cambrai, Saint-Omer, Tournai, and Namur, despite the presence of Flemish-speaking parishes in Saint-Omer and the continued spiritual authority of Tournai over cities like Courtrai. Destatte also highlights examples of religious orders dividing their provinces along linguistic lines: the Jesuits in 1615, the Carmelites in 1681, and the Récollets and Capuchins with the establishment of their Provincia Walloniae. Similarly, Pierre Guérin explores the role of the Jesuits in shaping Walloon consciousness and its evolving traditions in an article included in a volume honoring Édouard Remouchamps.

Building on Albert Henry's philological study of the terms Wallon and Wallonie, linguist Jean Germain analyzes the "Latin" prehistory of the word Wallonie in a brief article. This study is based on a corpus of maps depicting the Capuchin province of Gallo-Belgique, which feature alternative terms such as Wallonia, Vallonia, and Wallonica. These maps were compiled by Julien Lambert, a historian from Nivelles with origins in Liège, specifically for their references to the word Wallonie. Germain emphasizes that his analysis does not challenge Henry's conclusion that there is no direct continuity between these Latin mentions from the 16th and 17th centuries and the French form Wallonie used in the context of the newly established Belgian state. He dates the maps to the second half of the 17th century, though precise dating remains uncertain. His article offers a twofold summary: a grammatical analysis, examining whether the mentions are nouns or adjectives, and a geopolitical analysis, assessing the geographic and political extent of the province as shown on the maps. Grammatically, Germain finds that the terms are roughly evenly divided between substantive forms ending in -iae (genitive) and adjectival forms ending in -ica. Geopolitically, he compares the province's depicted coverage—generally approximate—to the contemporary area inhabited by Romance-language speakers in the Spanish Netherlands and, partially, in the Principality of Liège.

== See also ==
- Spanish Netherlands
- Counter-Reformation
- History of the term Wallon

== Bibliography ==
- Dierickx, Michiel Leopold (1966). L'érection des nouveaux diocèses aux Pays-Bas 1559-1570 [The establishment of new dioceses in the Netherlands, 1559–1570]. Notre Passé (in French). Brussels: La Renaissance du livre.
- Dierickx, Michiel Leopold (1950). De oprichting der nieuwe bisdommen in de Nederlanden onder Filips II. 1559-1570 [The establishment of new dioceses in the Netherlands, 1559–1570] (in Dutch). Anvers: N.V. Standaard-Boekhandel.
- de Moreau, Édouard (1952). Histoire de l'Eglise en Belgique [History of the Church in Belgium] (in French). Vol. V: L'église des Pays-Bas 1559-1633. Brussels: L'Edition universelle.
- Juste, Théodore (1860). Histoire de la révolution des Pays-Bas sous Philippe II [History of the Dutch Revolution under Philip II] (in French). Vol. I. Brussels: Alex Jamar.
- Germain, Jean (2007). "La pré-histoire « latine » du mot Wallonie" [The "Latin" prehistory of the word Wallonia]. Images et paysages mentaux des XIXe siècle et XXe siècles de la Wallonie à l'Outre-Mer, Hommage au professeur Jean Pirotte à l'occasion de son éméritat [Images and mental landscapes of the 19th and 20th centuries from Wallonia to overseas territories, Tribute to Professor Jean Pirotte on the occasion of his retirement] (in French). Louvain-la-Neuve: Academia Bruylant, Presses Universitaires de l'UCL. pp. 35–48. ISBN 978-2-87209-857-6.
- Postma, Folkert (1990). Nieuwe licht op een oude zaak : de oprichting van de nieuwe bisdommen in 1559 in Tijdschrift voor Geschiedenis [New light on an old case: the establishment of the new dioceses in 1559 in Journal of History] (in Dutch). Utrecht: Éd. Royal Van Gorcum. pp. 10–27.
- Humblet, Jean-Émile; Gilmont, Jean-François; Lemeunier, Albert; Henrivaux, Omer; Pirotte, Jean (1984). Église-Wallonie [Church-Wallonia] (in French). Vol. 2: Jalons pour une histoire religieuse. Brussels: Vie Ouvrière. ISBN 978-2-87003-179-7.
- Pirenne, Henri (1922). Histoire de la Belgique [History of Belgium] (in French). Vol. II. Brussels: Max Lambertin.
- Pirenne, Henri (1907). Histoire de la Belgique [History of Belgium] (PDF) (in French). Vol. III. Brussels: Max Lambertin.
- Pirenne, Henri (1911). Histoire de la Belgique [History of Belgium] (PDF) (in French). Vol. IV. Brussels: Max Lambertin.
- Lacrosse, Jean-Marie (1997). "La Belgique telle qu'elle s'ignore" [Belgium as it does not know itself]. Le Débat (in French) (94): 12–40.
- Châtellier, Louis (1993). La religion des pauvres : les missions rurales en Europe et la formation du catholicisme moderne, XVIe – XIXe siècle [The religion of the poor: rural missions in Europe and the formation of modern Catholicism, 16th–19th centuries] (in French). Aubier. ISBN 978-2-7007-2250-5.
- Duverger, Arthur (1887). L'Inquisition en Belgique [The Inquisition in Belgium] (in French). Verviers: Bibliothèque Gilon.
- Poncelet, Alfred (1921). Histoire de la Compagnie de Jésus dans les anciens Pays-Bas [History of the Society of Jesus in the former Netherlands] (in French). Vol. I: Histoire générale. Brussels: Lamertin.
- Raes, Jules (1945). De Kapucijnen in de Nederlanden en het Prinsbisdom Luik [The Capuchins in the Netherlands and the Prince-Bishopric of Liège] (in Dutch). Vol. I: De tweetalige Nederlandsche provincie, 1585–1616. Anvers: Archief der Kapucijnen.
- Raes, Jules (1946). De Kapucijnen in de Nederlanden en het Prinsbisdom Luik [The Capuchins in the Netherlands and the Prince-Bishopric of Liège] (in Dutch). Vol. II: De Waalsche Kloosters. Anvers: Archief der Kapucijnen.
- Raes, Jules (1957). Les Capucins en Belgique et au nord de la France, synthèse historique illustrée [The Capuchins in Belgium and northern France, an illustrated historical overview] (in French). Anvers: Anvers.
- Goosens, Aline (1997). Les Inquisitions dans les Pays-Bas méridionaux à la Renaissance (1519-1633) [The Inquisitions in the Southern Netherlands during the Renaissance (1519–1633)]. Spiritualités Libres (in French). Vol. I: Législation. Brussels: Editions de l'ULB.
- Goosens, Aline (1998). Les Inquisitions dans les Pays-Bas méridionaux à la Renaissance (1519-1633) [The Inquisitions in the Southern Netherlands during the Renaissance (1519–1633)]. Spiritualités Libres (in French). Vol. II: Les Victimes. Brussels: Editions de l'ULB.
- Claessens, Chanoine P (1886). L'Inquisition et le régime pénal pour la répression de l'hérésie dans les Pays-Bas du passé [The Inquisition and the penal system for the suppression of heresy in the Netherlands in the past] (in French). Turnhout: Splichal-Roosen.
