= Walloon Guards =

Former Spanish Army guard regiment

Walloon Guards Guardia Valona
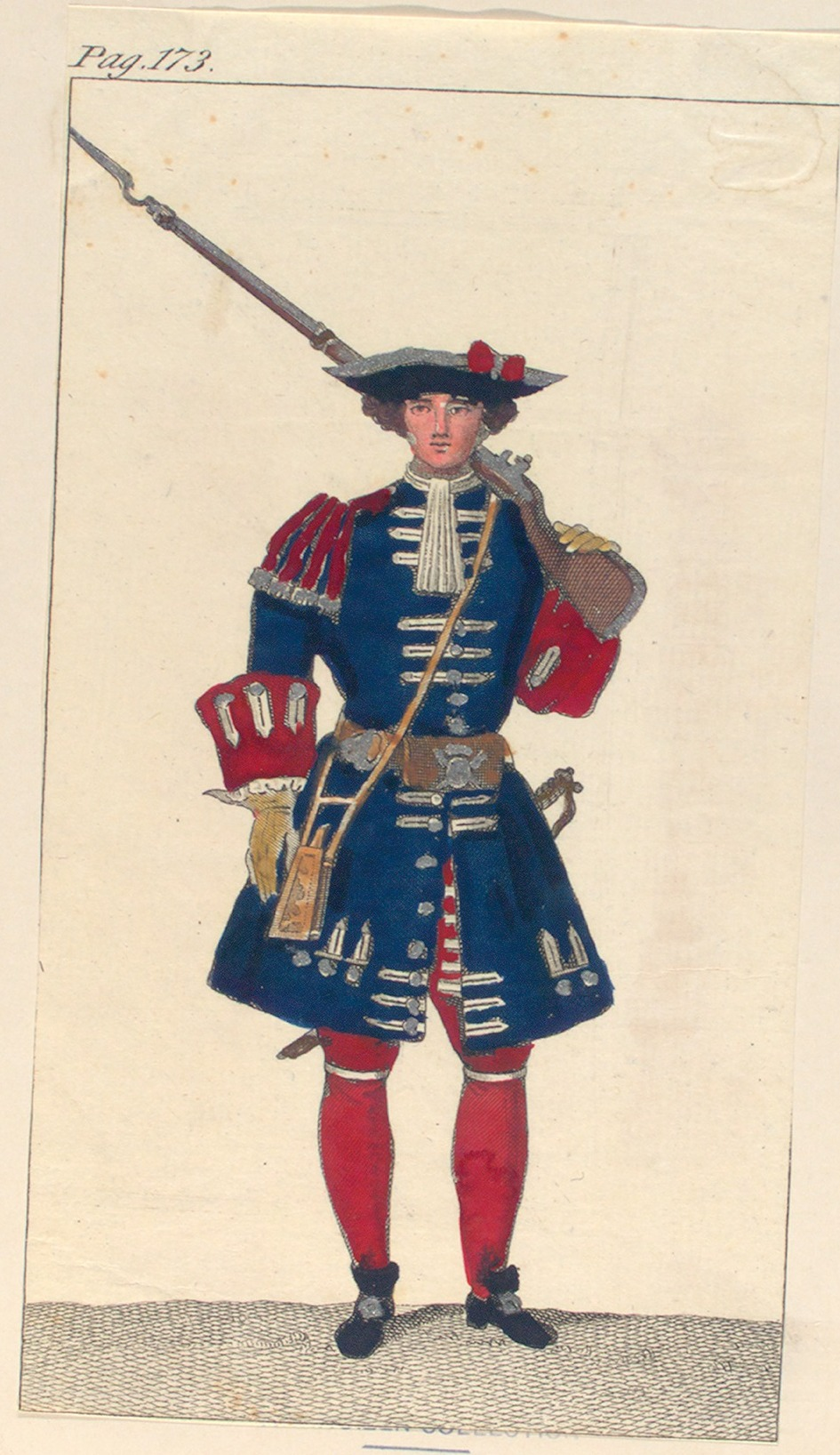
- Illustration of a regimental soldier in 1717
- Active: 1703–1820
- Allegiance: Spain
- Branch: Spanish Army
- Type: Infantry
- Role: Royal guard
- Engagements: War of the Polish Succession; War of the Austrian Succession; Motín de Esquilache; Spanish War of Independence

Commanders
- Notable commanders: Ramón María Narváez

The Walloon Guards (Gardes Wallonnes; in Spanish, Guardias Valonas) were an infantry corps recruited for the Spanish Army in the region now known as Belgium, mainly from Catholic Wallonia. As foreign troops without direct ties amongst the Spanish population, the Walloons were often tasked with the maintenance of public order, eventually being incorporated as a regiment of the Spanish Royal Guard.

== History ==
=== Origins ===
The Walloon Guards were first raised in 1704, at a time when the Low Countries were under the Spanish Crown as the Spanish Netherlands. "Walloons" was the Germanic (walha) name for their romanized neighbors. Initially Walloon line infantry regiments were formed by the Flemish, the Brabantians and Walloons to the number of 4,000 men and were recruited among the strongest and tallest men available, to spearhead assaults or to cover retreats.

=== Establishment ===
The decision to raise a regiment of Walloon Guards was taken on 17 October 1702 by Philip V of Spain and the new unit arrived in Spain in December the following year. They were linked with the Spanish Guards (Gardes Espagnoles) raised shortly before. Both regiments had the same organisation, disciplinary regulations and uniforms of dark blue, red and silver. The model for both were the French Guards (Gardes Françaises) of the French Maison du Roi, a detachment of whom were sent to Spain in 1703 to act as instructors.

=== Recruitment ===
After the independence of the United Netherlands in 1648 and the cession of the Spanish Netherlands to Austria at the Treaty of Utrecht in 1714, Walloons continued to serve in the Spanish army together with foreign soldiers from Switzerland, Ireland, and Italy. The Walloon Guards remained a primarily Walloon unit, although the Austrian authorities attempted to discourage recruitment in the former Spanish Netherlands. Most officers of the Regiment came from long established Spanish families of Walloon origin. In Similarly, some rank and file members of the regiment remained in Spain when their period of service was over, took Spanish wives and encouraged their sons to enlist in the various Walloon units of the Spanish Army. Until about 1808 the upper ranks of the Walloon Guards had to provide evidence of their aristocratic lineage and private incomes.

=== Late 18th century ===
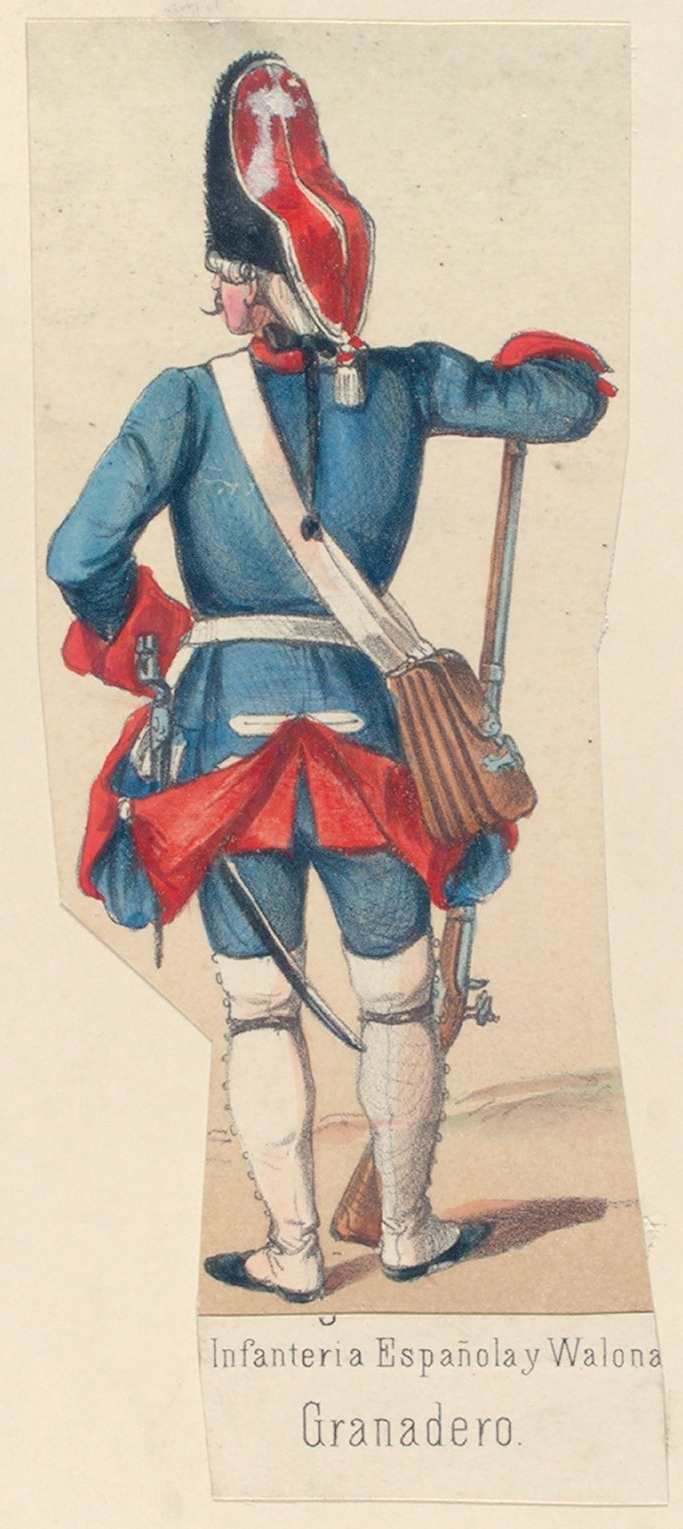
Illustration of a regimental grenadier in 1761

In March 1766, the Walloon Guard was amongst the troops defending Charles III of Spain during the Esquilache Riots, and shots fired by a detachment of the regiment killed a woman, intensifying the crowd's anger. Demands made by the rioters to the king included the disbanding of the Walloon Guards, several of whom were killed during the disturbances. To end the rioting Charles III agreed to disband the regiment, though he reneged on his promise and even increased the unit's pay in June 1767.

The Walloon Guards played a significant role in the Great Siege of Gibraltar from 1779 to 1783. By this date shortfalls in recruiting from the Netherlands were being made up by drawing on Irish and German sources. Until the Austrian Netherlands were overrun and annexed by the First French Republic in 1794, the region continued to supply 400 to 500 recruits per year to the Walloon Guards through a recruitment office in Liège. The three Walloon line infantry regiments, Brabante, Flandes and Bruselas, were dissolved and redistributed to other regiments between 1791 and 1792.

=== Peninsular War ===
Part of the Walloon Guards were stationed in Madrid at the time of the French occupation in October 1808. These were incorporated into the French Army, which already included a significant number of Belgian and Dutch units. Four battalions of Walloon Guards garrisoned in Barcelona and Aragon continued in Spanish service, seeing much action against the French. With recruitment from the Southern Netherlands effectively ceasing, the Walloon Guards were reduced in numbers to two battalions by January 1812, in spite of drawing on Spanish volunteers as replacements.

=== Post-Restoration ===
With the restoration of the Spanish Bourbon monarchy in 1814 the Royal Guard was reassembled, but continuing recruitment difficulties meant that the Walloon Guards had become a mainly Spanish unit. On 1 June 1818 the Walloon Guards were accordingly renamed as the Second Regiment of Royal Guards of Infantry, losing their traditional distinctions. In 1824 a new Guardia Real was raised drawing entirely on Spanish conscripts or volunteers from the regular army.
