= Albert Henry =

Albert Henry may refer to:

- Albert Henry (historian) (1910–2002), Belgian historian
- Albert Henry (politician) (1907–1981), first Premier of the Cook Islands
- Albert Henry (rugby union), rugby union player who represented Australia
- Albert Henry (cricketer) (c. 1880–1909), Aboriginal Australian cricketer
- Al Henry (born 1949), Albert Henry, basketball player
- Al B. Henry (1911–1989), American politician
