= Roman Catholic Diocese of Middelburg =

Former Roman Catholic diocese in the Netherlands

The Roman Catholic Diocese of Middelburg was a short-lived (1559–1603) Latin Catholic suffragan diocese in the ecclesiastical province of the Archbishop of Utrecht, with episcopal see at Middelburg, on Walcheren (former) island in the Dutch Zeeland province.

== History ==
Established on 12 May 1559 as Diocese of Middelburg on territory, covering the southwestern Dutch province of Zeeland (Dutch Sea land, at the North Sea coast and estuaries of the great rivers Rijn = Rhine, Schelde = Escaut and Maas = Meuse), canonically split-off from the huge, France-based Diocese of Cambrai, which was simultaneously promoted an Archdiocese, like the then Diocese of Utrecht, which became Middelburg's Metropolitan.

In 1603, during the Eighty Years War (when Habsburg lost most northern territory; including Middelburg after a long siege), the bishopric was suppressed, without a formal successor, its territory being included in the pre-diocesan Dutch Mission 'Batavia', while its incumbent was transferred to the richer, safer see of Bruges in Flanders (Dutch-speaking part of the countship in the northwest of Belgium).

The 1803.03.22 establishment of the Apostolic Vicariate of Breda (later enlarged and promoted to bishopric), including the same territory (then split off from the Diocese of ’s-Hertogenbosch), is considered as a restoration of the Middelburg see.

Foundations for Middelburg's "stately and picturesque" cathedral (one of only two pre-Reformation cathedrals in The Netherlands, along with St. Martin's in Utrecht) were first laid in the 10th century; additional construction continued through the Middle Ages.

== Episcopal ordinaries ==
(all Roman Rite)

Suffragan Bishops of Middelburg

- Nicolaas van der Borcht (10 March 1561 – death 16 May 1573)
- Jan van Strijen (4 June 1576 – death 8 July 1594)
- Karel-Filips de Rodoan (10 January 1600 – 25 May 1603), later Bishop of Bruges (Belgium) (16 September 1569 – death 12 May 1594).

== External links and sources ==
- GCatholic
