= *Walhaz =

Proto-Germanic word for Roman or Romanised peoples

The Tjurkö bracteate showing the word ᚹᚨᛚᚺᚨᚲᚢᚱᚾᛖ walhakurne ('Roman grain', i.e. gold coin)

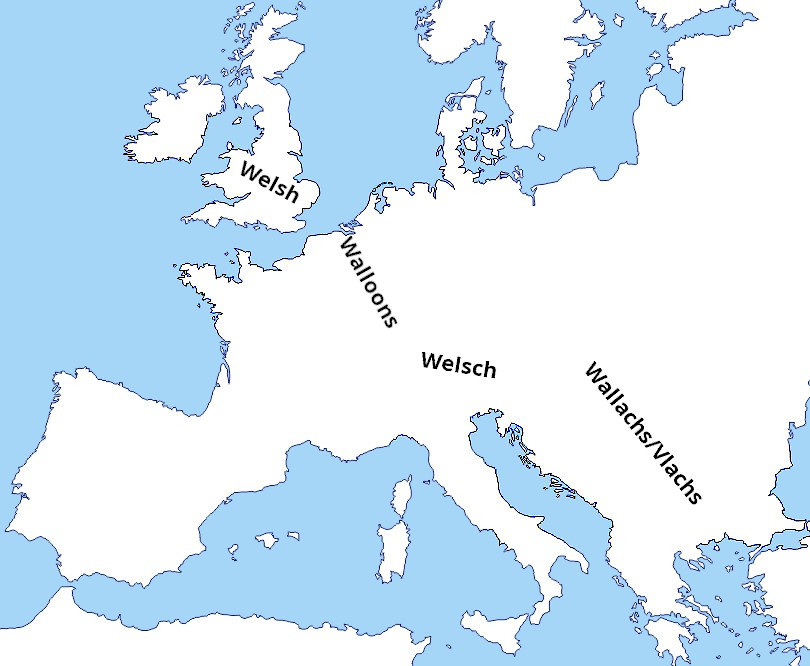
Map of Walhaz-derived exonym variants for Romance speakers

*Walhaz is a reconstructed Proto-Germanic word meaning 'foreigner', or more specifically 'Roman', 'Romance-speaker' or '(romanised) Celt', and survives in the English words of 'Wales/Welsh' and 'Cornwall'. The term was used by the ancient Germanic peoples to describe inhabitants of the former Roman Empire, who were largely romanised and spoke Latin languages (cf. Valland in Old Norse). The adjectival form is attested in Old Norse valskr, meaning 'French'; Old High German walhisc, meaning 'Romance'; New High German walsch, used in Switzerland and South Tyrol (Walisch) for Romance speakers; Dutch Waals 'Walloon'; Old English welisċ, wælisċ, wilisċ, meaning 'Brythonic'. The forms of these words imply that they are descended from a Proto-Germanic form *walhiska-.

== From *Walhaz to welsch ==
*Walhaz is a loanword derived from the name of the Celtic tribe which was known to the Romans as Volcae (in the writings of Julius Caesar) and to the Greeks as Οὐόλκαι Ouólkai (Strabo and Ptolemy). The Volcae tribe occupied territory neighbouring that of the Germanic people and seem to have been referred to by the proto-Germanic name *Walhaz (plural *Walhōz, adjectival form *walhiska-). It is assumed that this term specifically referred to the Volcae, because application of Grimm's law to that word produces the form *Walh-. Subsequently, this term *Walhōz was applied rather indiscriminately to the southern neighbours of the Germanic people, as evidenced in geographic names such as Walchgau and Walchensee in Bavaria or Wallersee in Salzburg and Walensee in Switzerland. Place names containing the element *walhaz denote communities or enclaves in the Germanic-speaking world where Romance was spoken.

In Old English, *walhaz developed into wealh, retaining the inherited meaning 'a foreigner, more particularly a pre-Anglo-Saxon inhabitant of Britain who spoke Celtic or Latin or both'. Because of the social position of the British natives, in the West Saxon dialect of Old English it came to mean '(British) slave'. The old feminine derivative of *walhaz, Old English wiln < *wielen < * wealh-in-, even exclusively means 'a female slave' and is likewise concentrated in the Saxon south of England.

== From *Walhaz to Vlach ==
In Eastern Europe, *Walhaz became Vlach/Wallachian (and other variants such as Vlah, Valah, Valach, Voloh, Blac, Oláh, Vlas, Ilac, Ulah, etc.). Via Latin, in Gothic, as *walhs, the ethnonym took on the meaning 'foreigner' or 'Romance-speaker' and later "shepherd', 'nomad'. The term was adopted into Greek as Vláhoi or Blachoi (Βλάχοι), Albanian vllah, Slavic as Vlah (pl. Vlasi) or Voloh, Hungarian as oláh and olasz, etc. The root word was notably adopted in Germanic for Wales and Walloon, and in Switzerland for Romansh-speakers (German: Welsch), and in Poland Włoch or in Hungary olasz became an exonym for Italians. The Slovenian term Lahi has also been used to designate Italians. The same name is still used in Polish (Włochy, Włosi, włoskie) and Hungarian (Olasz, Olaszország) as an exonym for Italy, while in Slovak (Vlach - pl. Vlasi, Valach - pl. Valasi), Czech (Vlachy) and Slovenian (Laško, Láh, Láhinja, laško) it was replaced with the endonym Italia.

Other forms which were recognised by linguists to designate the "Vlachs" are: Blaci, Blauen, Blachi found in Western medieval sources, Balachi, Walati found in Western sources derived from medieval German, while the Germanic population from Transylvania used also the variants Woloch, Blôch. French sources used mostly Valaques while the medieval Song of Roland used Blos. In English and in modern German the forms Wallachians, Walachen appear, respectively. In the Balkan Peninsula various names such as Rumer, Tzintzars, Morlachs, Maurovlachs, Armâns, Cincars, Koutzovlachs were used, while Muslim sources speak of Ulak, Ilak, Iflak.

== See also ==
- Vlachs, also known as Wallachs
- Theodiscus
- Names of the Celts
- History of the term Wallon
