= Albert Henry (historian) =

Belgian historian

Albert Henry (Grand-Manil, 20 March 1910 – Nancy, 22 February 2002) was a Belgian Romance philologist and a Walloon activist.

== Biography ==
A Romance philologist at the Université libre de Bruxelles and a graduate of the École pratique des hautes études at the Paris Sorbonne, Albert Henry studied literature in the second half of the twentieth century. His work is marked by an attachment to Wallonia and his friendship with the poet Saint-John Perse, of whose poetic work he organized the critical edition. A medievalist, he edited numerous Romance literary works, including those of François Villon.

In 1938, he was conscripted as a reserve officer in the artillery. He participated in the Fortified position of Namur and was taken as a prisoner of war on 28 May 1940, at the time of the surrender ordered by Leopold III. He remained in a German camp for prisoners of war, known as an Oflag or a Stalag. During his captivity, he wrote clandestinely Offrande wallonne about the contributions of the Romance regions of Belgium to French civilization. In the last chapter, Henry described the possibility of a division of Belgium. His vision of Wallonia was distinguished by the primacy he accorded to the common language of the inhabitants of "Romance Belgium," that is French, in Wallonia and in Brussels.

He was a member of the Royal Academy of Science, Letters and Fine Arts of Belgium, a professor at Ghent University from 1946 to 1958, and then a professor at the Université libre de Bruxelles from 1958 to 1976.

He was elected a foreign member ("socio straniero") of the Accademia dei Lincei.

In 1976, he cosigned the Lettre au Roi pour un vrai fédéralisme (Letter to the King for a true federalism) with Marcel Thiry, Fernand Dehousse, and Jean Rey.

Among his many works, one of the most famous was his Histoire des mots "Wallon" et "Wallonie" (History of Walloon words and Wallonia), reprinted several times, notably and for the last time at the Institut Destrée in 1990.
