= Reestablishment of the episcopal hierarchy in the Netherlands =

Outcome of 1843 papal bull

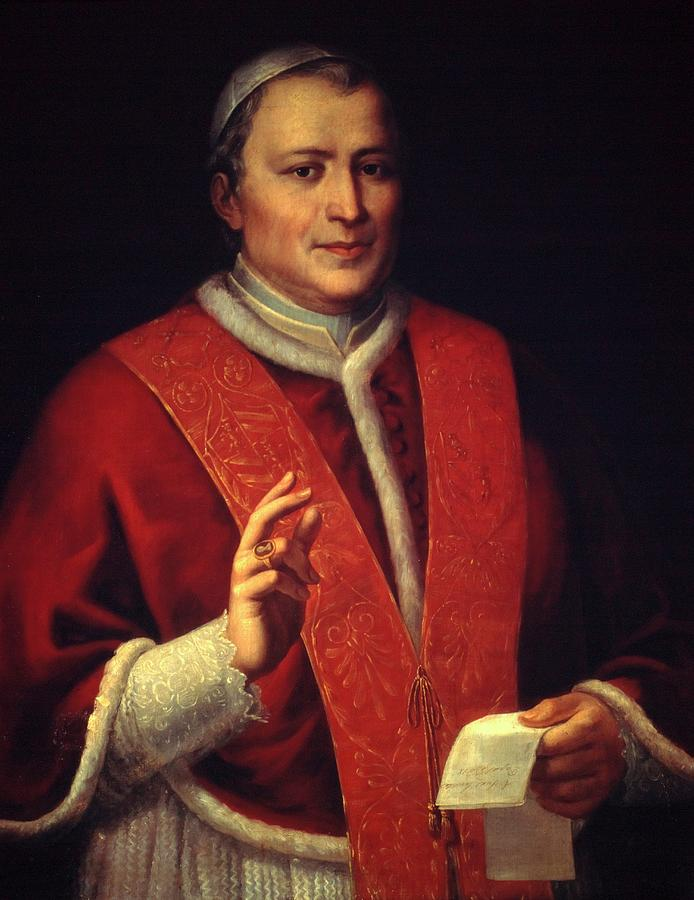
Pope Pius IX reestablished the hierarchy

On 4 March 1853, Pope Pius IX restored the episcopal hierarchy in the Netherlands with the papal bull Ex qua die arcano, after the Dutch Constitutional Reform of 1848 had made this possible. The re-establishment of the episcopal hierarchy led to the April movement protest in 1853.

== Disestablishment of the Catholic Church ==
After becoming head of state of the Spanish Empire (including the Low Countries), crusading Habsburg king Philip II of Spain reorganised the Dutch dioceses in 1559. Utrecht became an archdiocese and together with the suffragan dioceses of Haarlem (central and North Holland), Middelburg (Zeeland), Deventer (Overijssel and Gelderland), Groningen (Groningen) and Leeuwarden (Friesland), they would form the northern ecclesiastical province of Utrecht. Roermond and 's-Hertogenbosch became part of the southern ecclesiastical province of the Metropolitan Archbishop of Mechelen (further roughly including present Belgium).

After the Dutch Revolt, the northern Netherlands formed the independent Dutch Republic, where Protestant Calvinism was privileged while Catholicism was severely restricted. The first Archbishop of Utrecht, Frederik V Schenck van Toutenburg, was removed from office, thereby ending the short-lived archdiocese. In 1592, Rome declared the province of Utrecht a mission area, the Dutch Mission 'Batavia', soon headed by an apostolic vicar. 's-Hertogenbosch later also became an apostolic vicariate when normal episcopal administration became impossible after the Westphalian Peace of Münster in 1648.

After initial persecution, Catholics were eventually tolerated, especially in the larger cities, as long as they would not openly profess Catholicism. In many cities, Catholics went to Mass in clandestine churches, which had exteriors that were not recognisable as churches.

== Prelude to the re-establishment ==
The de jure position of the Catholic Church in the Netherlands improved when the Batavian Republic declared the separation of Church and State in 1796. The different denominations would have equal rights. Some of the Catholic church buildings, which the Protestants seized in the 16th century, were returned. The Catholic community began to organise itself again; newspapers, magazines and schools were created. State regulation remained however: wearing clerical clothing in public and ringing church bells were not allowed for example.

Napoleon Bonaparte and Pope Pius VII solved a number of pending issues between church and state with the Concordat of 1801. (Note: See "Napoleon's concordat (1801): text". concordatwatch.eu. Translated from French by Muriel Fraser. Archived from the original on 2014-07-07. Translated from "Convention entre sa Sainteté Pie VII, et le Gouvernement français". napoleon.org (in French). Fondation Napoléon. 2008. Archived from the original on 2009-01-08.) New apostolic vicariates were set up to prepare for a future re-establishment of the dioceses. The Diocese of Antwerp was abolished and North Brabant, which used to be a part of it, became the Apostolic Vicariate of Breda. The Diocese of Roermond was also abolished and divided between the Dioceses of Liege and of Aachen (Germany). The last bishop of Roermond, Jan Baptist Robert baron van Velde tot Melroy en Sart-Bomal, was appointed vicar of the new Apostolic Vicariate of Grave-Nijmegen in 1801. The Vicariate of Ravenstein-Megen, then part of the Diocese of Liège, became the Apostolic Vicariate of Ravenstein-Megen.

The "Ministry of Roman Catholic Worship Affairs" (Dutch: Ministerie van Zaken der Rooms-Katholieke Eredienst) was founded in the Kingdom of Holland. The king received certain rights to intervene in ecclesiastical organisation. From 1812 - at this point the Netherlands was a part of Napoleon I Bonaparte's French Empire - the so-called "extinction acts" (Dutch: uitstervingsbesluiten) would prevent monasteries from accepting new members, its ultimate purpose being the elimination of monastic orders.

== Restoration of the Catholic Church ==
=== Concordat of 1827 ===
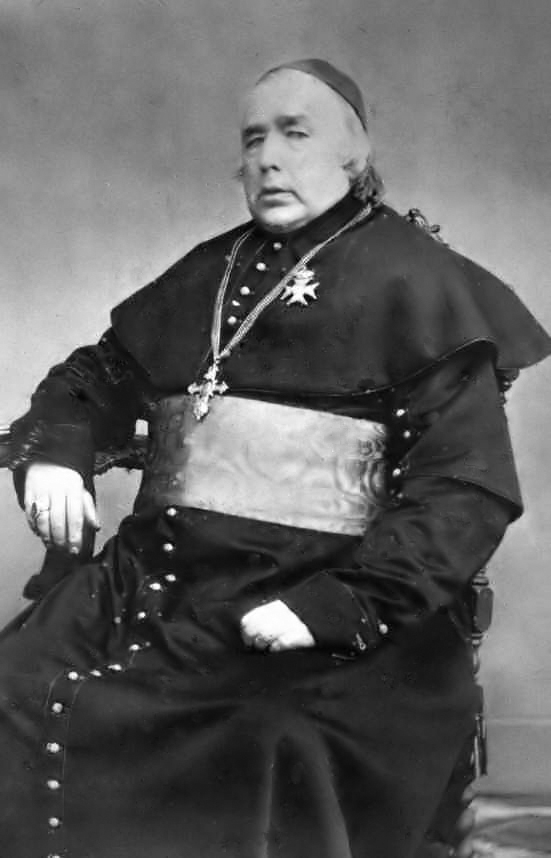
Joannes Zwijsen, first Archbishop of Utrecht, after the re-establishment of the hierarchy

In 1827, the United Kingdom of the Netherlands reached an agreement with Pope Leo XII about the re-establishment of the dioceses in the Netherlands. (Note: See "Convention and accord between Pope Leo XII and William I, King of Belgium and the Netherlands". concordatwatch.eu. Translated from Dutch by Ilonka Nagy. Archived from the original on 2013-05-11. Translated from "Het Concordaat van 1827". rorate.com (in Dutch). Translated from Latin by the Secretaris der Permanente Commissie, uit den Raad van State voor de Zaken van de R.C. Eeredienst. 2003-08-20. Archived from the original on 2013-06-17. Translated from Pacca, Bartolomeo (1903) [concluded 1827-09-16]. "Conventio Inter Sanctissimum Dominum Leonem XII, Summum Pontificem, et Serenissimum Guilielmum I, Belgarum regem". In Albers, Petrus H. (ed.). Geschiedenis van het herstel der hiërarchie in de Nederlanden (in Dutch). Nijmegen, NL: Malmberg. pp. 534–545. OCLC 38329195.) This concordat established two dioceses in the northern Netherlands:

- Diocese of Den Bosch, including the provinces of North Brabant, Zeeland and Gelderland
- Diocese of Amsterdam, including the northernmore rest of the Netherlands, with the exception of Limburg, as Limburg and the province of Liège (in feudal times both largely in the prince-bishopric of Liège) would form the Diocese of Liège, suffragan to the Archdiocese of Mechelen.

The concordat even contained complete plans for a cathedral on Nieuwmarkt square in Amsterdam, but these were not realised because of the Belgian Revolution, among other reasons.

King William I though, reaffirmed the restrictions that were imposed earlier on the monasteries. Protestant politicians were also not unanimously in favour of a restored Catholic hierarchy. However, in 1833 a suffragan bishop was appointed to the Dutch Mission. Although Bishop Cornelis van Wijckerslooth had no diocese, he had all the powers of a bishop, such as administering the sacrament of Confirmation, ordaining priests and consecrating churches.

When the Treaty of London (1839) established the border between the Kingdom of Belgium and the Kingdom of the Netherlands, Dutch Limburg became the Apostolic Vicariate of Limburg, led by Joannes Paredis, who was consecrated bishop in 1841. A real restoration of the dioceses in the Netherlands seemed too early and negotiations on the implementation of the Concordat of 1827 halted. As a compromise, vicars Joannes van Hooydonk and Henricus den Dubbelden, were consecrated as bishop in Breda and 's-Hertogenbosch respectively in 1842. That same year, Joannes Zwijsen was appointed bishop, and was given control over the vicariates Grave-Nijmegen and Ravenstein-Megen. The latter appointment was seemingly made after personal intervention by King William II. William II was more favorable towards the Catholics and put an end to restrictive legislation for the monasteries.

=== Complete restoration ===
In 1847, a number of prominent Roman Catholics called for a normalisation of the Dutch ecclesiastical administration. Bishop Wijckerslooth and the bishop of Liège, Cornelius Richard Anton van Bommel supported their request. The final restrictions on the Catholics were removed in the 1848 constitutional reform. The decision was during a meeting of the Congregation for the Propagation of the Faith in December 1852. Pope Pius IX approved the plan, and in 1853 it was implemented. This was the end of the Dutch Mission in the north and the apostolic vicariates in the south.

Zwijsen was appointed archbishop of the re-established Dutch ecclesiastical province. The Roman Catholic Church was reorganised into one archdiocese (Utrecht) and four suffragan dioceses (Haarlem, 's-Hertogenbosch, Breda and Roermond). In honor of the missionary Willibrord, the archiepiscopal see was established in Utrecht. The dioceses of Groningen-Leeuwarden and of Rotterdam were founded later in 1956.

== See also ==
- Roman Catholicism in the Netherlands
