= Nicolaas van Nieuwland =

Dutch Roman Catholic prelate

The Most Reverend Nicolas Van Nienlant
- Bishop of Haarlem; Auxiliary Bishop of Utrecht
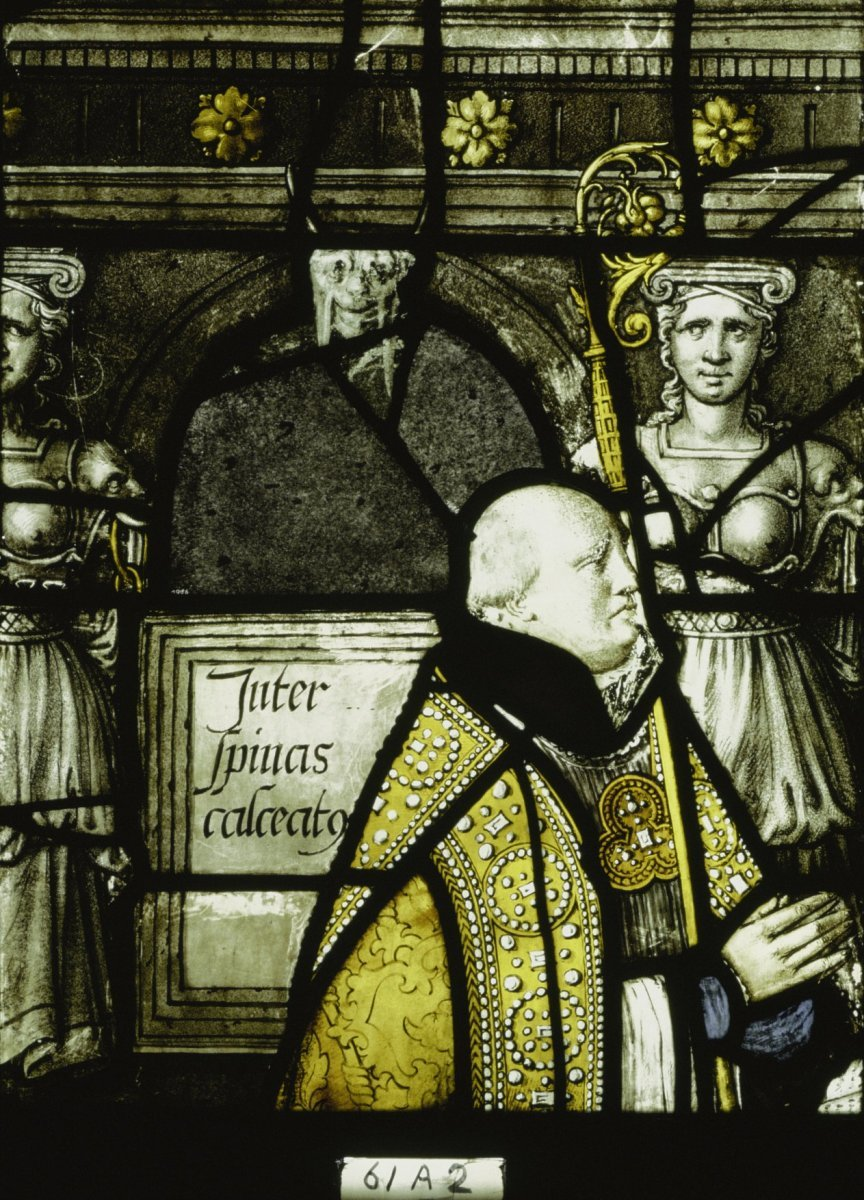
- Church: Roman Catholic
- Installed: 6 November 1561
- Term ended: 1569
- Predecessor: Diocese established
- Successor: Godfried van Mierlo

Orders
- Consecration: 11 Sep 1541 by George van Egmond

Personal details
- Born: 9 June 1510 Maartensdijk
- Died: 15 June 1580 (aged 70) Utrecht, Lordship of Utrecht

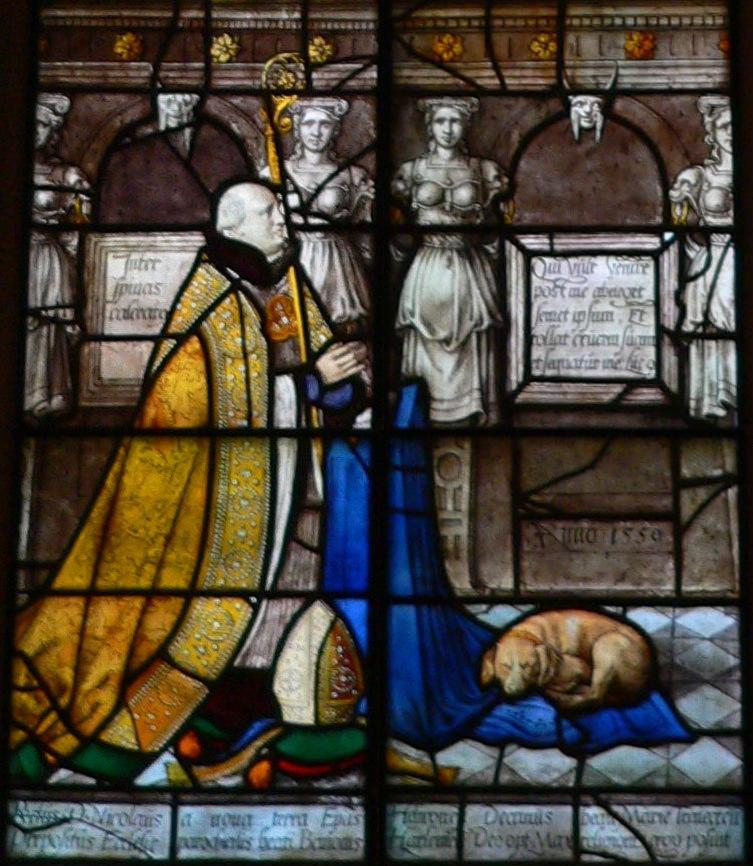
Nicolaas van Nieuwland, portrayed in a stained glass window designed by the workshop of Dirk Crabeth in 1556-9 for the Regulierskerk in Gouda, now on display in Janskerk (Gouda).

Nicolaas van Nieuwland, or Nicolas Van Nienlant (9 June 1510 – 15 July 1580) was a Dutch Roman Catholic prelate who served as Bishop of Haarlem and abbot of Egmond Abbey from 1562 to 1569 and as Auxiliary Bishop of Utrecht (1541–?).

== Biography ==
Van Nieuwland became bishop when he was still young. On 6 Jul 1541, Nicolas Van Nienlant was appointed during the papacy of Pope Paul III as Auxiliary Bishop of Utrecht and Titular Bishop of Hebron. On 11 Sep 1541, he was consecrated bishop by George van Egmond, Bishop of Utrecht, with Nicolas Bureau, Auxiliary Bishop of Tournai and Titular Bishop of Sarepta, and Pascase Maupair, Titular Bishop of Selymbria, serving as co-consecrators. It is uncertain how long he served as Auxiliary Bishop of Utrecht.

=== Move of the Reguliers ===
In 1550 he managed the move of the Reguliers, monks from the monastery in Stein, South Holland (where Erasmus was educated) to a Double monastery (also housing the Bridgettines) in Gouda. The former home of the reguliers in Land van Steyn, (nl:Klooster Emmaüs te Stein), had been lost in a fire in 1549. The convent they moved to in Gouda, was renovated for them by order of George van Egmond and the former sacristy was remodeled into a choir which housed eleven stained glass windows (today on display in seven windows in the Janskerk (Gouda) in the extra room called the Van der Vorm kapel). Despite these renovations, the Regulierskerk did not survive long after that, because the monastery reverted to the state after the Protestant Reformation in 1580 and the church was torn down. For centuries the Catholic Hofje (nl:Hofje van Buytenwech), which was founded on the grounds of the monastery in 1563, was allowed to remain on the Raam in Gouda, but this too was finally torn down in 1958.

In 1580, before destroying the Regulierschurch, the expensive stained glass windows and the accompanying cartoons were moved to the Janskerk, where they were most recently restored in 1922 and given a separate chapel.

=== Diocese Haarlem ===
In 1559 a new diocese was introduced, the diocese Haarlem, and Nicolaas van Nieuwland became bishop of this new diocese on November 6, 1561. He entered the city on February 1, 1562, with a formal procession. Van Nieuwland also became abbot of Egmond Abbey at the same time.

At the time that Van Nieuwland was in Haarlem, the Protestant Reformation was gaining ground in the Northern Netherlands, and Haarlem was a seat of unrest due to the school there under the leadership of Dirck Volckertszoon Coornhert. Van Nieuwland was faced with a slowly shrinking Catholic population as the townspeople reverted to Protestantism and followed Coornhert, who sided with Lamoral, Count of Egmont and William the Silent, against the Catholic leaders of Van Nieuwland, the newly appointed Frederik V Schenck van Toutenburg, who received his orders from Philip II of Spain. Van Nieuwland's protector George van Egmond had died in 1559.

Perhaps because of these developments, he became an alcoholic, and is registered as walking in processions drunk, earning him the local nickname Dronken Klaasje. He was asked to step down in 1569, and he was replaced by Godfried van Mierlo. Van Nieuwland returned to Utrecht, where he later died.
