= Lordship of Utrecht =

Feudal dominion in the Netherlands (1528–1795)

Lordship of Utrecht Heerlijkheid Utrecht (Dutch)
- 1528–1795
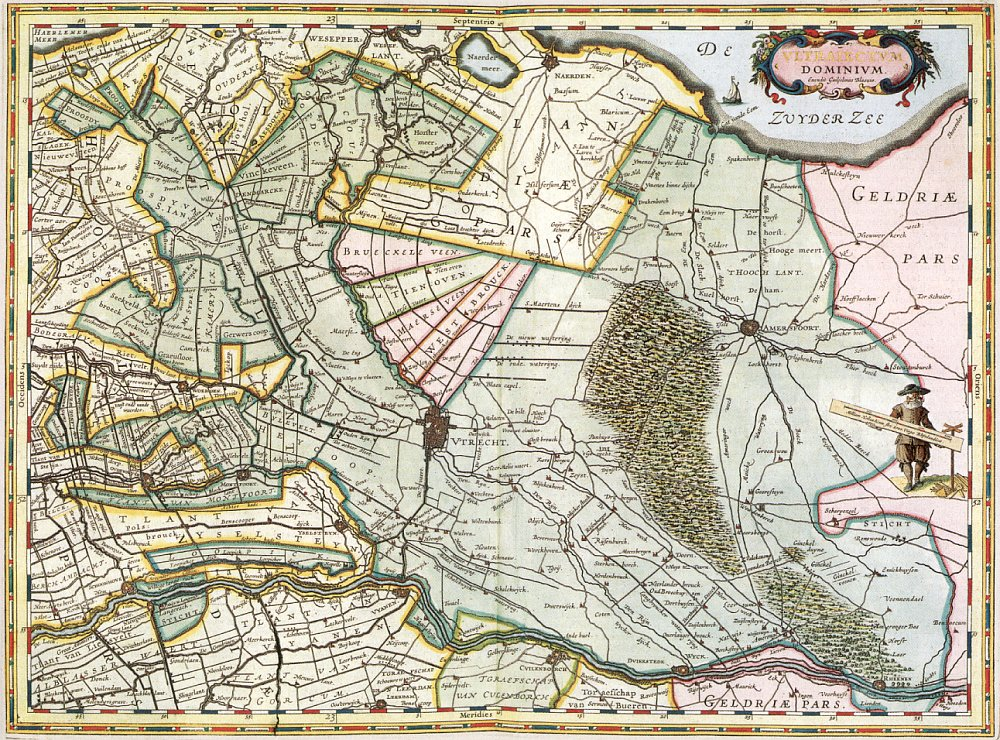
- The Lordship of Utrecht in the early 17th century.
- Status: State of the Holy Roman Empire (until 1581); Province of the Dutch Republic (from 1581)
- Capital: Utrecht; 52°05′27″N 5°07′18″E
- Common languages: Dutch
- Religion: Catholic Church Protestantism
- Government: Feudal monarchy
- Historical era: Renaissance
  - Established: 1528
  - Part of Dutch Republic: 1581
  - Disestablished: 1795
Preceded by	Succeeded by
Prince-Bishopric of Utrecht	Batavian Republic

The Lordship of Utrecht was formed in 1528 when Charles V of Habsburg conquered the Bishopric of Utrecht, during the Guelders Wars.

In 1528, at the demand of Henry of the Palatinate, Prince-Bishop of Utrecht, Habsburg forces under Georg Schenck van Toutenburg, liberated the Bishopric, which was occupied by the Duchy of Guelders since 1521–22. On October 20, 1528, Bishop Henry handed over power to Charles of Habsburg. The Bishopric of Utrecht came to an end and was divided into the Lordship of Utrecht and the Lordship of Overijssel, both ruled by a Habsburg Stadtholder.

Between 1528 and 1584 the Stadtholder of Utrecht was the same as the Stadtholder of the County of Holland. The Lordship became part of the Burgundian Circle by the Pragmatic Sanction of 1549, and one of the Seventeen Provinces.

During the Eighty Years' War, Utrecht joined the revolt against Charles's son Philip II of Spain from the beginning. It was at the center of the Union of Utrecht in 1579.

When the Batavian Republic was created in 1795, the Lordship of Utrecht was abolished.

== History ==
=== Prince-Bishopric of Utrecht ===
George Edmundson wrote, in Encyclopædia Britannica, 1911 edition, that the bishops had no hereditary or dynastic interest in his land, and, as a temporal ruler, their powers were limited by the necessity of having to secure the goodwill of the higher clergy, of the nobles and of the cities, and also because of their relations to the Holy Roman emperors and the popes as ecclesiastical princes of the Holy Roman Empire. Edmundson also wrote that the bishops, in fact, as the result of grants of immunities by a succession of German kings, and notably by the Saxon and Franconian emperors, gradually became the temporal rulers of a dominion as great as the neighboring counties and duchies. Through the grants of land and privileges bestowed by these emperors the bishops of Utrecht became among the most powerful feudal lords of the north-western part of the empire.

=== Under the Habsburgs ===
Henry of the Palatinate who was also Bishop of Freising and Worms, resigned the see in 1528 with the consent of the chapter, and transferred his secular authority to Charles V, Holy Roman Emperor, who was also Duke of Brabant and Count of Holland. Thus Utrecht came under the sovereignty of the Habsburgs; the chapters voluntarily transferred their right of electing the bishop to Charles V, and Pope Clement VII gave his consent to the proceeding. The first bishop appointed by Charles V, Cardinal Willem van Enckevoirt, died in 1533 without having ever entered his diocese.

In 1548 the Lordship of Utrecht, together with Guelders, was transferred from the Lower Rhenish–Westphalian Circle to the Burgundian Circle, aligning it with the other Habsburg territories in the Low Countries in terms of imperial administration.

In 1550, at the insistence of Philip II of Spain, the church organization of the Netherlands was restructured by forming new dioceses and reorganizing the old ones. The Diocese of Utrecht was taken from Province of Cologne, in which it was a suffragan, and elevated to the rank of an archdiocese and metropolitan see. Its suffragan dioceses were Haarlem, Bois-le-Duc, Middleburg, Deventer, Leeuwarden, and Groningen. But the new ecclesiastical province had not a long existence.

In 1559, Utrecht was raised to the rank of an archdiocese and metropolitan see with six suffragan dioceses, but this new state of affairs did not last long. When the northern provinces of the Netherlands revolted, the archdiocese fell, with the overthrow of the Spanish power. According to the terms of the Union of Utrecht, the rights and privileges of the Roman Catholic religion were safeguarded, however a few years later, on June 14, 1580, the public practice of Catholicism was forbidden by the magistrates of Utrecht, who were by then mostly Protestant Calvinists or had been forced to profess Calvinism. On August 25, 1580, Archbishop Schenk died, and two successors appointed by Spain did not receive canonical confirmation, neither could they enter their diocese. Archbishop Schenk's unornamented funeral inside the Dom Cathedral of Utrecht, recently seized by the Protestants, saw a clash between Catholic sympathizers and a Calvinist mob disturbing the De Profundis chant and the Catholic Requiem. The Catholic funeral of the first (and for a long period last) archbishop of Utrecht in 1580 remained one of the last public exercises of Catholic worship in the city of Utrecht for the next three hundred years.

During the administration of the first archbishop, Frederik V Schenck van Toutenburg, Calvinism spread rapidly, especially among the nobility, who viewed with disfavor the endowment of the new bishoprics with the ancient and wealthy abbeys. When the northern provinces of the Netherlands revolted and overthrew of the Spanish Netherlands, the archdiocese fell. As early as 1573, under the supremacy of the Calvinists, the public exercise of the Catholic faith was forbidden. The death of the nineteen Martyrs of Gorkum is an example of the persecution which Catholics suffered. The two successors appointed by Spain did not receive canonical confirmation and neither could they enter their diocese because of the States-General opposition.

=== Republic of the Seven United Provinces and Kingdom of the Netherlands ===
The See remained vacant until 1602, when the place of Archbishop was taken by the apostolic vicars of the Dutch Mission (Hollandse Zending), who, however, were not allowed in the country by the States-General of the Netherlands and had to administer their charge from abroad. These vicars were consecrated as titular archbishops in order not to offend the generally pro-Calvinist and anti-Catholic Dutch Republic's Government. They would assume the real title of Archbishop of Utrecht when circumstances permitted.

From the end of the 16th century their place was taken by vicars apostolic for the Dutch Republic, who, however, were generally driven from the country by the States-General and forced to administer their charge from abroad. Even though there was a great lack of priests, a very large part of the population of the Netherlands remained Catholic. Among these vicars apostolic, who were generally made titular archbishops, was Johannes van Neercassel, a friend of Antoine Arnauld and Pasquier Quesnel, who had fled from France and was inclined to Jansenism. His successor, Petrus Codde (1688–1704), was suspended in 1702 by Pope Clement XI on account of his Jansenistic opinions and his opposition to the papal see, and in 1704 the pope deposed him. The cathedral chapter of Utrecht, though, elected a vicar general in 1706 and then in 1723 with the approval of the States-General chose the parish priest of Utrecht, Cornelius Steenhoven, as archbishop. Steenhoven was excommunicated by Pope Benedict XIII. This was the origin of the Jansenistic Church of Utrecht, which, however, was joined by only a very small part of the Catholic clergy and laity, although the state favored it entirely. As the pro-vicars appointed by the pope were not permitted by the Government to enter the country, both the Catholic Church of Utrecht and that of the entire Netherlands was administered until the French Revolution by papal internuncios of Cologne and Brussels.

During the last period of the apostolic vicariate, Jansenism and Gallicanism spread among the Dutch clergy and vicar Petrus Codde was suspended by the Pope, who accused him of being a Jansenist. He continued as Archbishop, remaining out of communion with the Papacy. After his death the majority of the diocesan clergy continued to claim the right to elect the bishops for themselves.

Having obtained the permission of the Dutch government, in 1723 the chapter elected a new archbishop, who was not confirmed in post, and excommunicated by Pope Benedict XIII. This was the beginning of what would become the Old Catholic Church. All the Old Catholic Archbishops from 1723 until 1858 informed the Popes of their elections. The pope however appointed Roman Apostolic Vicars to the Netherlands (to Utrecht but with the seat in Amsterdam) until 1853, when Catholic diocesan hierarchy was re-established throughout the northern Netherlands with the bull Ex qua die arcano. In 1853, the Holy See was allowed to re-establish its hierarchy in the Netherlands. At present, the Archbishop who heads the Roman Catholic Archdiocese of Utrecht has frequently been promoted to cardinal. He is the Primate of the Netherlands and the Metropolitan of a province with six suffragans throughout the Netherlands.

Owing to the occupation of Holland by the French in 1795, the Catholics obtained somewhat more freedom. Still, there was no proper organization of church affairs, not even after the United Kingdom of the Netherlands was created by the Congress of Vienna in 1815. The concordat made between Pope Leo XII and William I of the Netherlands in 1827 was not carried out. (Note: See "Convention and accord between Pope Leo XII and William I, King of Belgium and the Netherlands". Translated by Ilonka Nagy. Archived from the original on 2013-05-11. "Het Concordaat van 1827" (in Dutch). Translated by De Secretaris der Permanente Commissie, uit den Raad van State voor de Zaken van de R.C. Eeredienst. 2003-08-20. Archived from the original on 2013-06-17. Translated from Pacca, Bartolomeo (1903) [concluded 1827-09-16]. "Conventio Inter Sanctissimum Dominum Leonem XII, Summum Pontificem, et Serenissimum Guilielmum I, Belgarum regem". In Albers, Petrus H. (ed.). Geschiedenis van het herstel der hiërarchie in de Nederlanden (in Dutch). Nijmegen, NL: Malmberg. pp. 534–45. OCLC 38329195.) In 1833 a vicar for the Netherlands was appointed once more.

The Constitutions of 1848 granted the Catholics at last complete parity with the other confessions, and gave the church authorities almost unlimited freedom in purely religious matters and in the administration of the property of the Church. The pope could now plan the restoration of the ecclesiastical hierarchy in the Netherlands. After long negotiations the most essential regulations of the Concordat of 1827 were put into force.

== See also ==
- Dutch Mission
