= Philippus Rovenius =

Dutch archbishop (1573–1651)

- Bishop of Utrecht
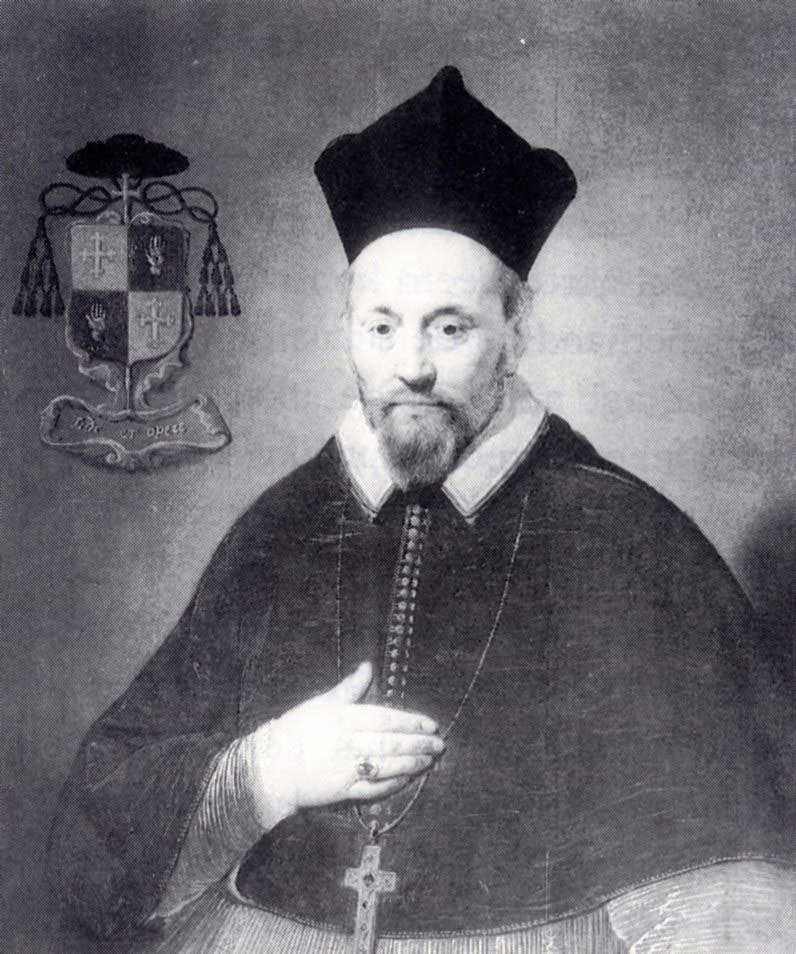
- Philippus Rovenius by Pieter de Grebber, 1631 (Museum Catharijneconvent, Utrecht).
- Church: Catholic Church
- Diocese: Archdiocese of Utrecht
- In office: 1614–1651

Personal details
- Born: 1 January 1573
- Died: 10 October 1651 (aged 78)

Philippus Rovenius (Dutch: Filips van Rouveen; baptised 1 January 1573, in Deventer – 10 October 1651, in Utrecht) was apostolic vicar of the Dutch Mission from 1614 to 1651.

== Life ==
Rovenius studied in Leuven, and was ordained priest in 1599. In 1602 he was made president of the Dutch priestly college in Cologne and in 1605 vicar general of the diocese of Deventer.

In 1614 he succeeded Sasbout Vosmeer as vicar apostolic. On 8 November 1620, in Brussels, he was consecrated titular archbishop of Philippi.

He based himself in Oldenzaal, then Groenlo (where he witnessed the Siege of Groenlo in 1627 first hand) and finally Utrecht. In 1640 he was banned in Amsterdam.

Rovenius succeeded in reorganising the Catholic Church in the Netherlands, trying to introduce the decisions of the Council of Trent. Although he had become friends with Jansenius in Leuven, he remained faithful to Rome in all things.

He died on 10 October 1651.

== Works ==
- Het gulden wierookvat (The Golden Censer, 1620), became popular in the 20th century
- Rituale Romanum contractum, a breviary containing the offices of saints in the archdiocese of Utrercht and the other dioceses of the Netherlands, used as an Officia sanctorum until 1853

Catholic Church titles
Preceded by Sasbout Vosmeer; 1602-1614	Apostolic Vicar of the Dutch Mission; 1614–1651	Succeeded by Jacobus de la Torre; 1651-1661
