= Willem van Ingen =

Dutch Golden Age painter

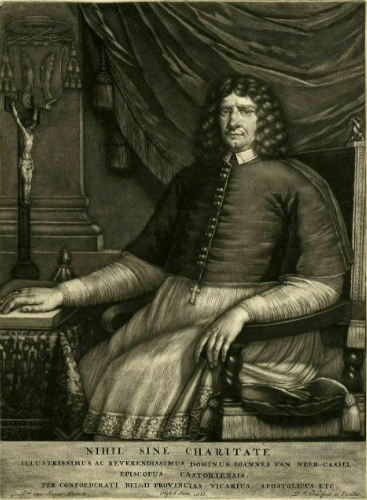
- mezzotint of Johannes van Neercassel, 1680
- Born: Willem van Ingen; 1651; Utrecht (city)
- Died: April 6, 1708 (aged 56); Amsterdam
- Known for: Painting
- Movement: Baroque

Willem van Ingen, or Guilhelmo Den Eersten (1651–1708), was a Dutch Golden Age painter active in Italy.

== Biography ==
According to Houbraken, he learned to paint in Utrecht and attracted the attention of Johannes van Neercassel, who took him along on a trip to Rome. In Rome, he registered in the Bentvueghels as Guilhelmo den Eersten. Houbraken goes on to mention that he worked for a year in Rome under Karel Marat, painting in many churches, and then traveled to Venice where he worked for Valentin Lefebvre painting on copper after Paolo Veronese. He then traveled to Naples before returning to the Netherlands.

He is also known as Guillelmo van Ingen. He is known as the teacher of Albert van Spiers (1665–1718), who was the teacher of Jacob de Wit, decoration painters in Amsterdam.
