= Jacobus de la Torre =

- Bishop of Utrecht
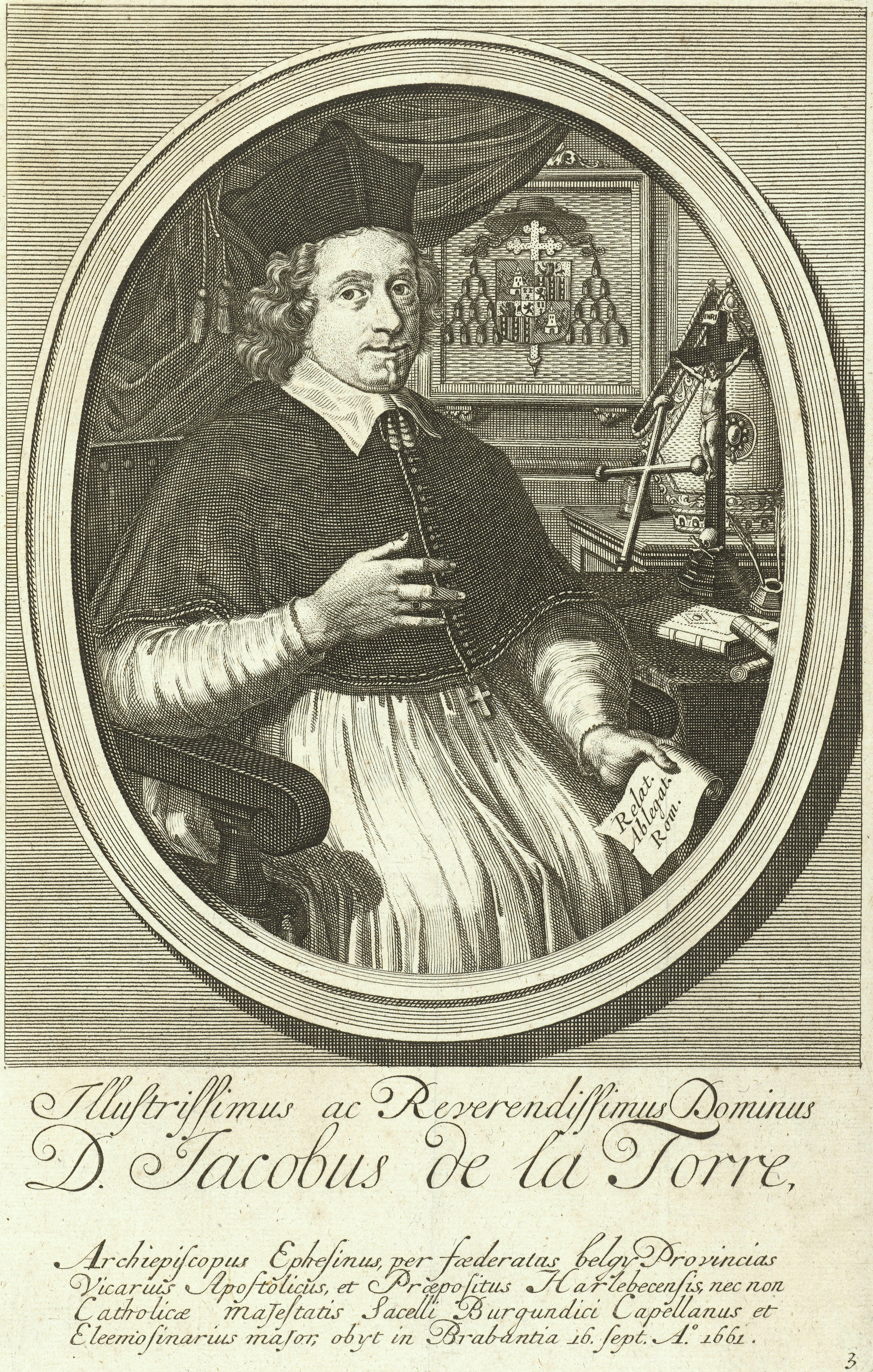
- Church: Catholic Church
- Diocese: Archdiocese of Utrecht
- In office: 1651–1661

Personal details
- Born: 1608
- Died: 16 September 1661 (aged 52–53)
- Coat of arms

Jacobus de la Torre (1608 – 16 September 1661) served as apostolic vicar of the Apostolic Vicariate of Batavia (1651–1661) and titular archbishop of Ephesus (1647–1661).

== Life ==
The merchant family De la Torre was originally from Spain and had settled in Bruges in the fifteenth century, where two members would hold the office of consul of the Spanish Empire. Descendant Philip de la Torre moved to The Hague in the early seventeenth century. Jacobus was born there as the second son of this Philip de la Torre, lord of Valkenisse and Maurik and of Henriette van Cuylenburg(h) (also: Hendrika van Culemborg), daughter of Zweder van Culemborg (1541–1597), descendant of a bastard branch from nobleman Hubert van Culemborg (1420–1481). The possession of the lordship of Valkenisse inherited on the brother of Jacobus, François de la Torre, married to Maria van Poelgeest, descendant of the noble Van Poelgeest family. Jacobus de la Torre also descended from the De Cock van Opijnen family.

Jacobus de la Torre studied in Leuven, and was ordained priest in 1633. In 1640 he was appointed coadjutor to Philippus Rovenius, and in 1647 appointed titular archbishop of Ephesus. In 1649 he was dismissed and exiled. He stayed on in Brussels, after a stay in Rome in 1655–56. On his return to Brussels he showed signs of dementia and in 1660 had to be hospitalised. To the dismay of the secular clergy he set up 11 new Jesuit stations in his Concessiones Ephesinae (1652). He died, aged about 53, at Huijbergen.

The Old Catholic Church of the Netherlands considers De la Torre as one of the archbishops of the Old Catholic Archdiocese of Utrecht

== Sources ==
- De Katholieke Encyclopaedie (Amsterdam, 1938)

== Citations ==
Catholic Church titles
Preceded by Philippus Rovenius; 1620-1651	Apostolic vicar to the Dutch Mission; 1651-1661	Succeeded by Boudewijn Catz; 1662-1663
Preceded by --	Apostolic vicar to the Roman Catholic Diocese of 's-Hertogenbosch; 1657-1661	Succeeded by Boudewijn Catz; 1662-1663
Preceded by Philippus Rovenius; 1620-1651	Archbishop of the Old Catholic Archdiocese of Utrecht; 1651-1661	Succeeded by Boudewijn Catz; 1662-1663
Preceded by Basilio Cacace; 1624-1646	Titular archbishop of the Catholic archdiocese of Ephesus; 1647-1661	Succeeded by Vitaliano Visconti; 1664-1667
