= Van Mierlo =

Van Mierlo is a Dutch toponymic surname, meaning "from Mierlo". People with this surname include:

- Godfried van Mierlo (1518–1587), Dutch Dominican Bishop of Haarlem and Abbot of Egmond
- Hans van Mierlo (1931–2010), Dutch politician and journalist, minister of Defence, minister of Foreign Affairs and Deputy Prime Minister
- Toine van Mierlo (1957), Dutch footballer
- Freddie van Mierlo (1989/1990), British politician
