= Valkenisse =

Valkenisse is the name of two locations in Zeeland, the Netherlands:

- Valkenisse, Walcheren
- Valkenisse, Zuid-Beveland
