= Codde =

Codde is a surname. Notable people with the surname include:

- Petrus Codde (1648–1710), Dutch Catholic church official
- Pieter Codde (1599–1678), Dutch painter
