= Apostolic Vicariate of Batavia =

Apostolic Vicariate of Batavia may refer to the following missionary Catholic jurisdictions:

- Apostolic Vicariate of Batavia (Holland)
- Apostolic Vicariate of Batavia (Java)
