= Sasbout Vosmeer =

Dutch Apostolic Vicar (1548–1614)

- Archbishop of Utrecht
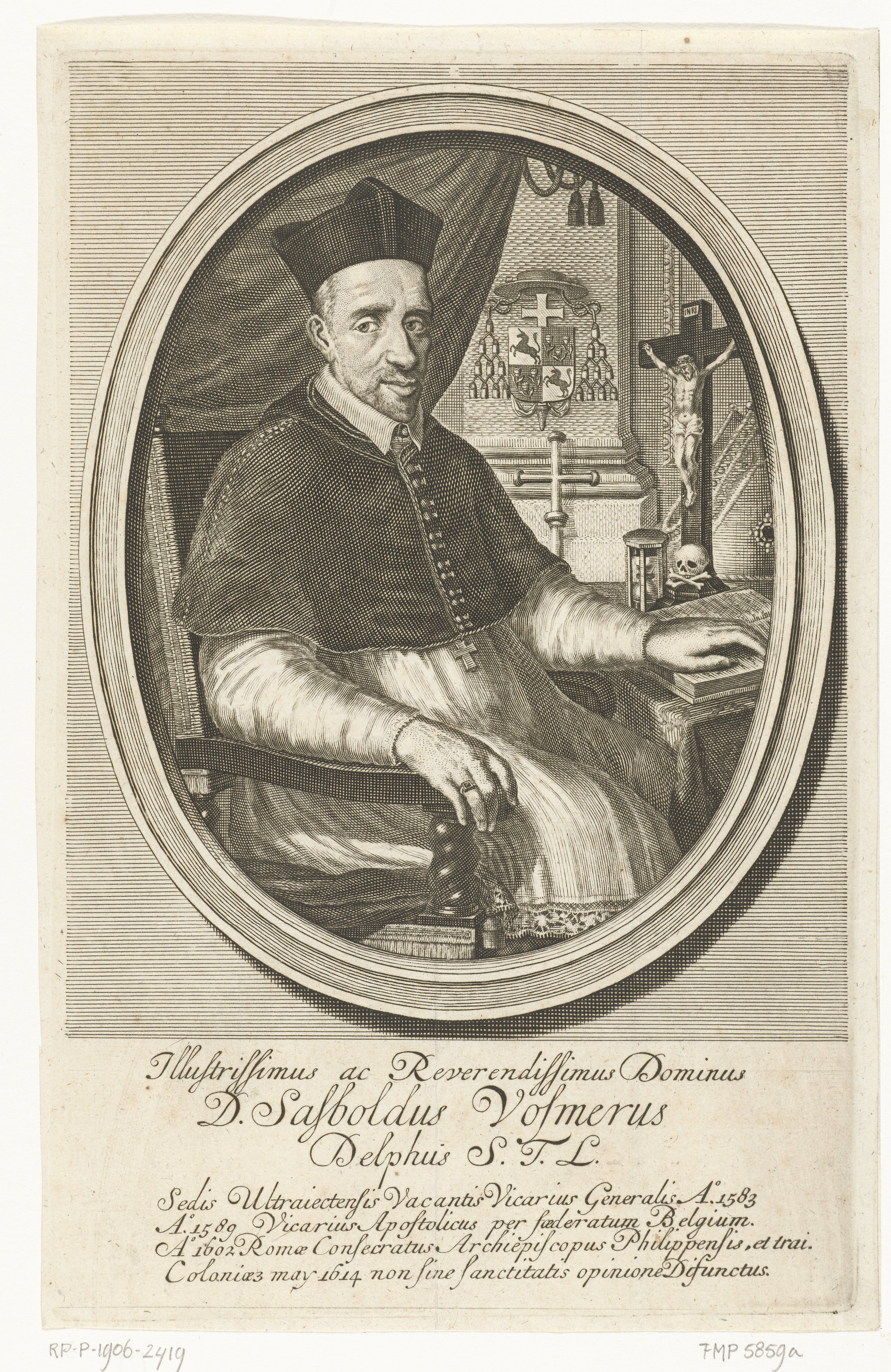
- Church: Catholic Church
- Diocese: Archdiocese of Utrecht
- In office: 1602–1614

Orders
- Ordination: 1572 by Frederik Schenck van Toutenburg
- Consecration: 21 July 1602 by Simeone Tagliavia d'Aragonia

Personal details
- Born: 13 March 1548 Delft
- Died: 3 May 1614 (aged 66) Cologne, Electorate of Cologne

Sasbout Vosmeer (13 March 1548, in Delft – 3 May 1614, in Cologne) was the first apostolic vicar to the Dutch Mission and succeeded Frederick Schenck van Toutenberg, the second Archbishop of Utrecht (1602–1614).

== Life ==
Vosmeer's father and mother were both from regenten families in Delft. He studied in Leuven and ordained priest in 1572 by archbishop of Utrecht Frederik V Schenck van Toutenburg. He then continued his studies in Leuven and Cologne, before in 1579 settling in Delft, where he intervened in mission work.

In 1582 Vosmeer was in Rome and in 1583 he returned to Delft, where on 1 May he was made vicar general to the Archdiocese of Utrecht. In 1592 he delegated powers over all dioceses in the church-province of Utrecht to the nuncio in Cologne and in 1601 he made Albertus Eggius vicar general of the diocese of Haarlem. When this became known to the States of Holland Vosmeer was searched out and Eggius imprisoned for some years. On 21 July 1602, Vosmeer was consecrated bishop by cardinal Simeone Tagliavia d'Aragonia. Vosmeer was officially appointed to head the Catholic community in the Dutch Republic as vicar apostolic by Pope Clement VIII in Rome on 22 September 1602, on which occasion he was also made titular archbishop of Philippi (since it was impossible to make him archbishop of Utrecht). This was against the wishes of the archdukes who, by the 1559 Concordat, demanded the right to nominate the apostolic vicar.

When it became clear that his role was to reorganise the Dutch Catholic church he was banned from the Republic in 1603, continuing the Mission's work from Cologne. In 1613 he founded the Collegium Alticollense in Cologne to train priests for the diocese of Utrecht and another in Leuven to train priests for the diocese of Haarlem. Since there was a shortage of priests, no structure was set up for the Mission by Vosmeer. In 1606 Vosmeer was in Groenlo during its siege by Prince Maurice.

Vosmeer tended towards inflexibility and instructed believers to refuse any decision of the States that could lead to an emergency, though this policy of his led to criticism from the Jesuits. He also gained the head of Balthasar Gérard, murderer of William the Silent, and kept it in Cologne, as well as taking it to Rome in a failed attempt to have Gérard canonised. Six years after his death, Vosmeer was succeeded as Archbishop of Utrecht by Philippus Rovenius in 1620.

Catholic Church titles
Preceded by First holder	Vicar Apostolic to the Dutch Mission; 1602–1614	Succeeded by Philippus Rovenius
