= Satisfactie van Haarlem =

Treaty

The Satisfactie van Haarlem was one of many treaties made at Veere in 1577 by which Willem the Silent ensured the loyalty of the towns under his rule.

Godfried van Mierlo set his seal to the Satisfactie van Haarlem, promising that the Roman Catholics of Haarlem would give allegiance to Willem the Silent rather than to Philip II of Spain on condition that the Roman Catholics would keep the same rights as Protestants. The town had lost the Siege of Haarlem in 1572 and had endured five years of Spanish occupation. A year after the treaty was signed, on 29 May 1578, the events of the Haarlemse Noon breached the treaty by disrupting and outlawing Roman Catholicism.
