= Apostolic Vicariate of Grave–Nijmegen =

The Apostolic Vicariate of Grave–Nijmegen was a short-lived (1801 - 1851) pre-diocesan Latin Catholic jurisdiction in southern parts of the present Netherlands (in North Brabant viz. Gelderland).

== History ==
Established on 22 March 1803 as Apostolic Vicariate (in principle entitled to a (titular) bishop) of Grave–Nijmegen, on territory split off from the Diocese of Roermond in course of suppression (completed 29 November, when the remainder of the diocesan territory was added), to which its last Bishop was appointed.

It was suppressed in 1851, its territory being merged into the Apostolic Vicariate of ’s-Hertogenbosch (now a diocese).

== Ordinaries ==
(all Roman Rite)

Apostolic Vicars of Grave–Nijmegen

- Joannes van Velde de Melroy en Sart-Bomal (1801 – death 1824); previously last Suffragan Bishop of Diocese of Roermond (1794.02.21 – 1801.11.29)
- Father Gerardus Hermans, Canons Regular of the Order of the Holy Cross (O.S.C.) (1824 – death 1840)
- Fr. Henricus van der Velden (1840 – death 1841), concurrently Apostolic Vicar of Ravenstein–Megen (Netherlands) (1839 – 1841)
- Apostolic Administrator 1842.01.24 – 1851 : Johannes Zwijsen, Titular Bishop of Gerrha (1842.01.24 – 1853.03.04), Ecclesiastical Superior of the Mission sui iuris of Batavia (Holland) (Netherlands) (1847 – 1848), Apostolic Vicar of Ravenstein–Megen (Netherlands) (1842.01.24 – 1851) and Coadjutor Apostolic Vicar of ’s-Hertogenbosch (Netherlands) (1842.01.24 – 1851.10.13); Founder of the Brothers of Our Lady, Mother of Mercy (of Tilburg) (1844.08.25); later succeeded as Apostolic Vicar of ’s-Hertogenbosch (Netherlands) (1851.10.13 – 1853.03.04), promoted Metropolitan Archbishop of Utrecht (Netherlands) (1853.03.04 – 1868.03.13) and Archbishop-Bishop (first proper episcopal Ordinary) of the thus-elevated bishopric ’s-Hertogenbosch (1853.03.04 – death 1877.10.16)

== External links and sources ==
- GCatholic (History and Ordinaries)
