= John III of Egmont =

Dutch noble (1438–1516)

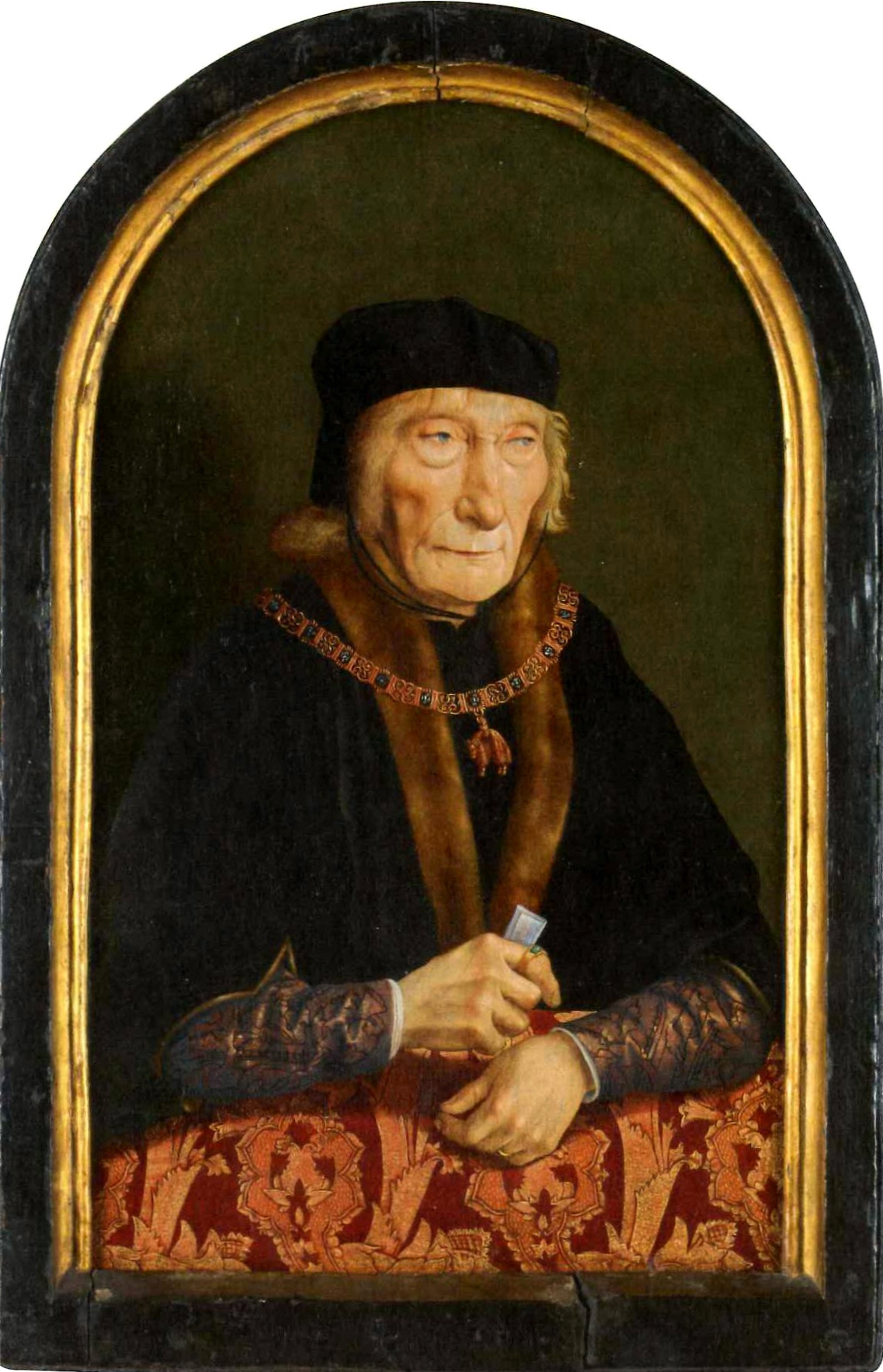
Portrait of John III of Egmont

John III of Egmont (or Egmond) (Hattem, 3 April 1438 – Egmond, 21 August 1516) was first Count of Egmont, Lord of Baer, Lathum, Hoogwoude, Aarstwoude, Purmerend, Purmerland and Ilpendam, and Stadtholder of Holland, Zeeland and West-Friesland.

== Biography ==
John was a son of William IV of Egmont and Walburga van Meurs.

As his father, he supported the pro-Burgundian party in the battle for control of Guelders.

In 1465 he made a pilgrimage to the Holy Land, where he was received into the Knights of the Holy Sepulchre.

When Charles the Bold came to power in Guelders, John was made bailiff of West-Friesland and governor of Arnhem in 1474.

For his role in the Hook and Cod wars, Maximilian of Austria made him Stadtholder of Holland, Zeeland and West-Friesland in 1483, a function he held until 1515. He also became Knight in the order of the Golden Fleece.

In 1491 he was confronted with the Bread and Cheese Revolt, a popular uprising in West-Friesland, which he crushed with the support of Albert III, Duke of Saxony.

Some portraits of John of Egmont are kept in the Rijksmuseum Amsterdam and the Centraal Museum of Utrecht. A diptych, painted by the Master of Alkmaar, is kept in the Metropolitan Museum of Art of New York.

Egmond coat of arms

== Marriage and Children ==
John married in 1484 with Magdalena van Werdenburg, daughter of George III of Werdenberg-Sargans and Catherine of Baden, daughter of Catherine of Austria , a cousin of Maximilian of Austria, and had 10 children, amongst whom;

- Walburga (ca. 1489–1529), first wife of William I, Count of Nassau-Siegen, father of William of Orange.
- John IV (1499–1528), his successor.
- George (ca. 1504 – 1559), Bishop of Utrecht.
- Catherine
- Johanna, married Georg Schenck von Tautenburg
- Philip (d.1529)
