= Catholic archdiocese of Ephesus =

Roman Catholic titular see

The Catholic Archdiocese of Ephesus is a suppressed and titular see of the Roman Catholic Church (in Latin: Archidioecesis Ephesina). It is the Catholic counterpart of the Greek Orthodox Metropolis of Ephesus, which is a titular bishopric under Patriarchate of Constantinople (in Greek: Μητρόπολις Εφέσου; Mitrópolis Efesou).

== History ==
Both the Catholic and Orthodox churches lay claim to the ancient bishopric founded in the 1st century by Saint Timothy.

Beginning in the 14th century, Ephesus was one of the archbishopric claimed by the Catholic Church, due in part to the Catholic Church involvement in the east Mediterranean.

The first known bishop was Franciscan named Corrado (fl1318) whom Le Quien called vir doctus et in linguis orientalis versatus. On several occasions the bishopric was attributed to bishops who later became cardinals. The last Catholic holder was Giovanni Enrico Boccella, emeritus bishop of Smyrna, who died on 22 May 1992.

== Catholic Bishops ==
- Corrado, O.F.M. † (July 5, 1318 - unknown)
- Raimondo Stefano, O.P. † (July 9, 1322 -unknown)
- Guglielmo, (June 16, 1349 -unknown)
- Giovanni di Perugia, (November 17, 1402 -unknown)
- Federico Mons, (January 2, 1411 -?)
- Luca Borsciani Cybo, (September 1522 - 1523)
- Pierre de Villars † (1 July 1613 - January 18, 1626)
- Vitalis de L'Estang (February 9, 1615 - August 11, 1621.
- Basilio Cacace (12 February 1624 - April 27, 1646)
- Jacobus de la Torre (9 November 1646 - 16 September 1661)
- Vitaliano Visconti (August 11, 1664 - March 7, 1667)
- Opisto Pallavicini (February 27, 1668 - September 2, 1686)
- Francesco Liberati (February 24, 1688 - April 18, 1703)
- Antonio Francesco Sanvitale (July 16, 1703 - May 6, 1709)
- Giacomo Caracciolo † (April 7, 1710 - January 17, 1718)
- Domenico Silvio Passionei (July 16, 1721 - June 23, 1738)
- Antonio Maria Pescatori, (June 22, 1739 - March 6, 1741) of Gallipoli
- Antonio Eugenio Visconti (January 28, 1760 - April 19, 1773)
- Nicola Buschi (April 11, 1785 - August 11, 1800)
- Benedict Sinibaldi (August 11, 1800 - April 1816)
- Paolo Leardi (September 23, 1816 - December 31, 1823)
- Giovanni Soglia Ceroni (October 2, 1826 - April 6, 1835)
- Lodovico Altieri (July 11, 1836 - April 21, 1845)
- Alessandro Asinari of San Marzano † (19 January 1846 - 2 July 1876)
- Francesco Folicaldi (March 12, 1877 - October 30, 1883)
- Tobias Kirby † (January 15, 1886 - January 20, 1895)
- Sebastiano Martinelli,(August 18, 1896 - April 15, 1901)
- Donato Raffaele Sbarretti Tazza † (December 16, 1901 - December 7, 1916)
- Lorenzo Lauri (January 5, 1917 - December 20, 1926)
- Valerio Valeri (October 18, 1927 - January 12, 1953)
- Sebastiano Baggio (June 30, 1953 - April 30, 1969)
- Giovanni Enrico Boccella (December 7, 1978 - May 22, 1992)

== See also ==
- Metropolis of Ephesus
