= Godfried van Mierlo =

Dutch Dominican friar and bishop

The Most Reverend Godfried van Mierlo O.P.
- Bishop of Haarlem
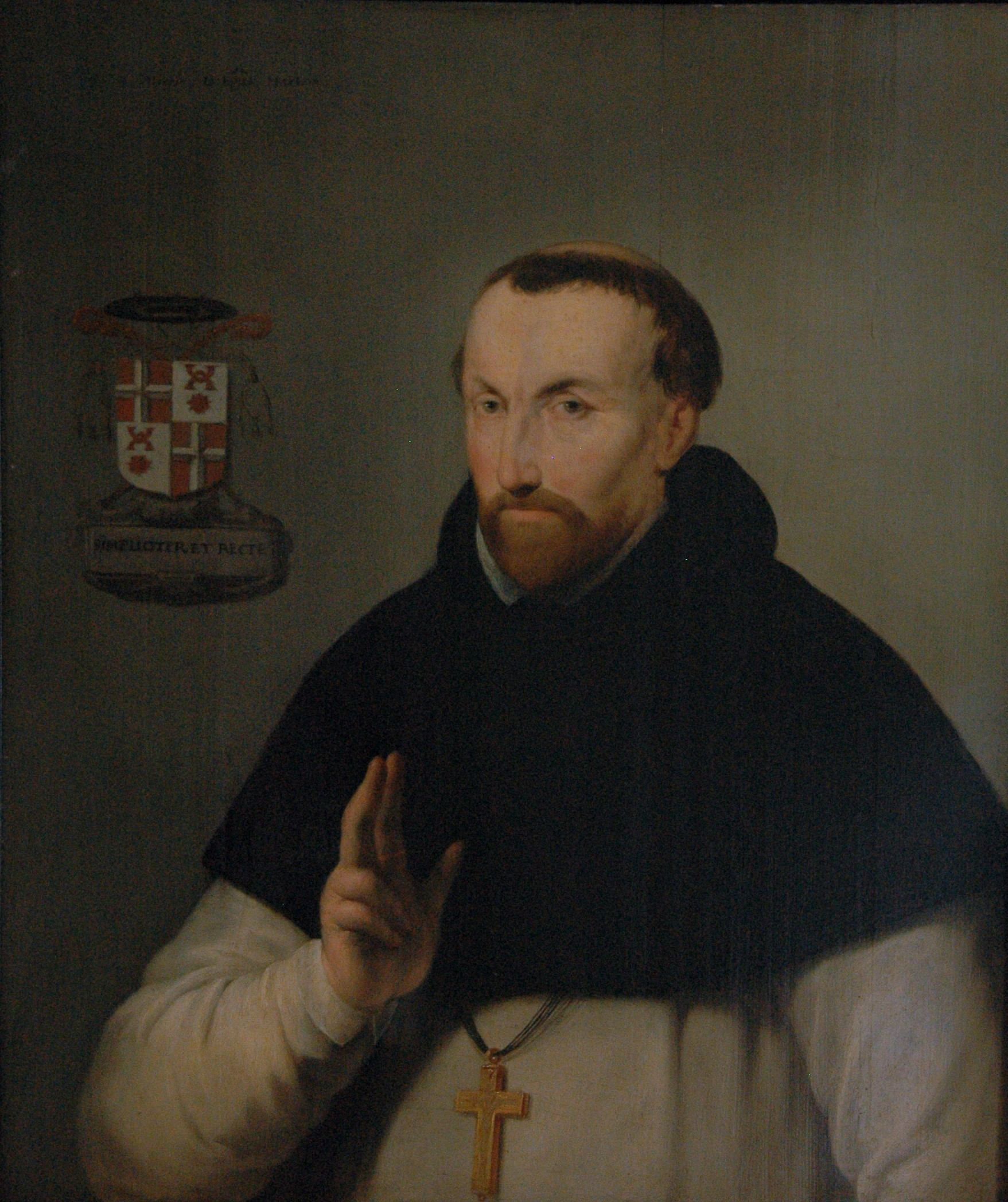
- Bishop Godfried van Mierlo, O.P.
- Church: Roman Catholic
- Installed: 4 March 1570
- Term ended: 29 May 1578
- Predecessor: Nicolaas van Nieuwland
- Successor: Diocese suppressed

Orders
- Ordination: 1542
- Consecration: 11 Feb 1571 by Franciscus Sonnius

Personal details
- Born: 2 February 1518; Helmond, Duchy of Brabant, Habsburg Netherlands
- Died: 28 July 1587 (aged 69); Deventer, Spanish Netherlands
- Buried: Lebuïnuskerk, Deventer

Godfried van Mierlo, O.P. (2 February 1518 – 28 July 1587) was a Dominican friar who served as the Bishop of Haarlem and the last direct Abbot of Egmond Abbey from 1570 to 1578.

== Biography ==
Van Mierlo was born in the City of Helmond on 2 February 1518, then the Duchy of Brabant, part of the Habsburg Netherlands. He entered the Dominican Order in 1533, at the age of 15, in 's-Hertogenbosch. He professed his religious vows as a friar of the Order the following year. After completing his studies, he was ordained a Catholic priest in 1542. He gained the degree of doctor of theology and was appointed as the Prior Provincial for Holland.

Van Mierlo was named the Bishop of Haarlem and the Abbot of Egmond Abbey in March 1570 by Pope Pius V. He was welcomed to that city in early 1571, where he was consecrated a bishop on February 11 of that year in the original Cathedral of St. Bavo by Franciscus van der Velde, the Bishop of Antwerp. The following year, however, on December 4, 1572, the cathedral suffered the iconoclastic destruction of the Beeldenstorm and temporarily became the scene of Calvinist services, which lasted until the end of the Siege of Haarlem. Van Mierlo had to re-sanctify the church in 1573. In Veere, in 1577, Van Mierlo set his seal to the "Satisfactie van Haarlem" wherein he promised to swear allegiance to Willem the Silent rather than Philip II of Spain, on the condition that the Catholics would keep the same rights as Protestants.

This was reversed a year later on May 29, the Feast of Corpus Christi that year, when Calvinist supporters again stormed the cathedral, this time during the celebration of the Hour of Terce at the 9th hour of the day, or 3:00 P.M., ravaging the altars, killing a priest and injuring several others. The provost of the cathedral, Jacobus Zaffius, who had witnessed the Amsterdam "Alteratie" two days earlier, saw it happen. Van Mierlo fled to Rome where Pope Gregory XIII appointed him coadjutor bishop of the Diocese of Münster. He was then appointed Bishop of Deventer in 1587, where he needed to re-sanctify the local churches. Van Mierlo died the year of his appointment at the age of 69, and was buried in the Lebuïnuskerk of Deventer.

After Van Mierlo fled Haarlem, the city was no longer an official Catholic bishopric, and the period from then onwards until 1798 (during the French occupation) was known as the Hollandse Zending, or Dutch Mission, where the Catholics had to worship in secret. However, the Haarlemse kapittel or cathedral chapter, remained active and St. Bavo was always called the cathedral by townsfolk, even after the Cathedral of Saint Bavo was built in the 19th century to serve the re-established Catholic diocese.
