= Pascase Maupair =

Medieval Catholic prelate

Most Reverend Pascase Maupair
- Titular Bishop of Selymbria
- Church: Catholic Church
- In office: 1533–1551
- Predecessor: Juan de Witte Hoos

Personal details
- Died: 1551

Pascase Maupair (died 1551) was a Roman Catholic prelate who served as Titular Bishop of Selymbria (1533–1551).

== Biography ==
Pascase Maupair was ordained a priest in the Order of Preachers. On 3 Sep 1533, he was appointed during the papacy of Pope Clement VII as Titular Bishop of Selymbria. He served as Titular Bishop of Selymbria until his death in 1551. While bishop, he was the principal co-consecrator of Nicolas Van Nienlant, Auxiliary Bishop of Utrecht.
