= Bread and Cheese Revolt =

Medieval uprising in the Benelux region

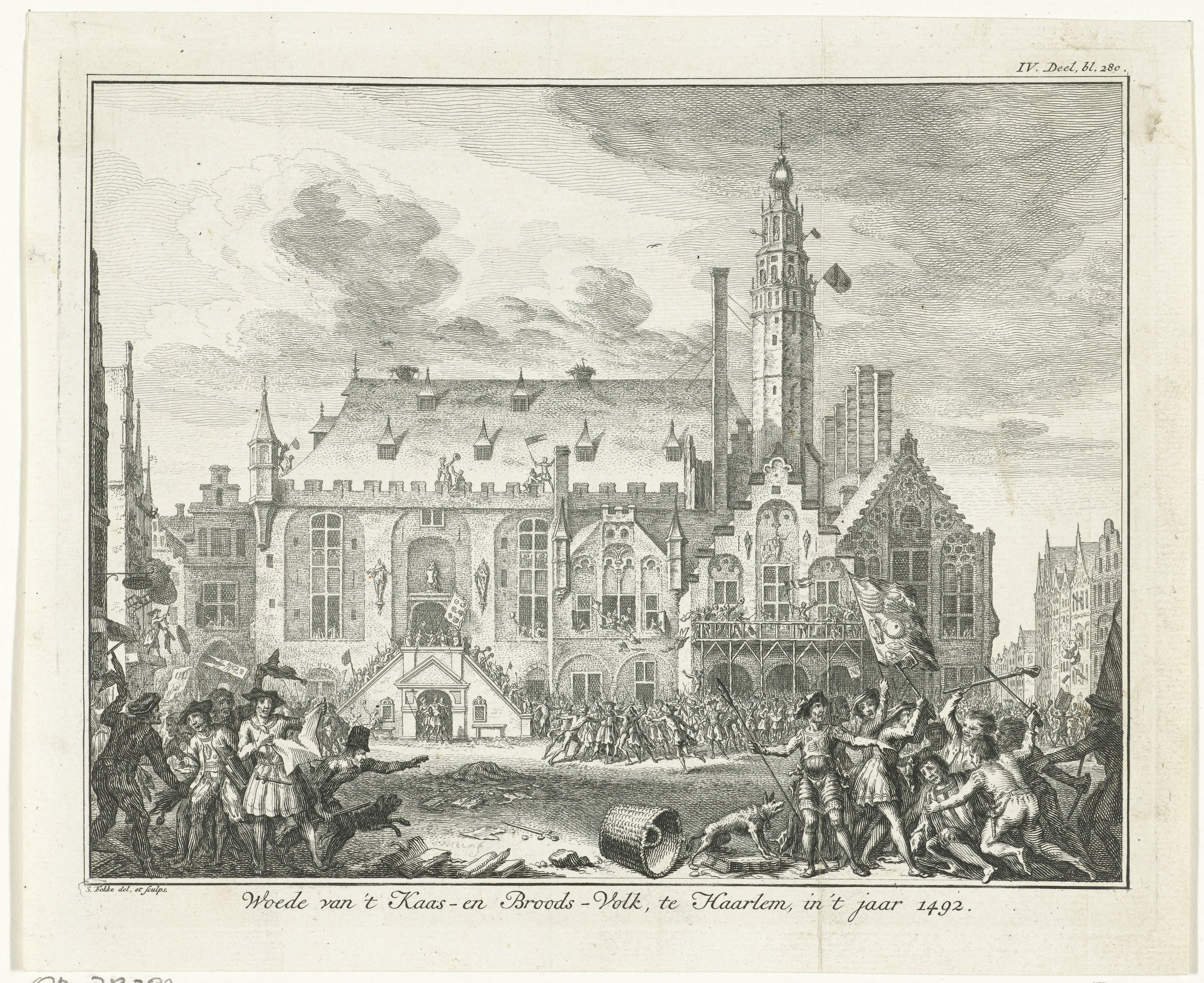
This 1750 "historic" engraving by Simon Fokke of the Bread and Cheese uprising in 1492 shows the Haarlem city hall being stormed by an angry mob.

The Bread and Cheese Revolt (or Bread-and-Cheese War) in Kennemerland, North Holland, was a folk uprising in 1491—92 when peasants and fishermen were provoked by an economic crisis, the tax oppression and garrison policy of John III of Egmont, the stadtholder appointed back in 1483 by Maximilian I. The revolt took its name from the emblems on the banners of insurgents.

The people, supported by inhabitants of Hoorn, Alkmaar and Haarlem, occupied those locations. The most hated tax collectors were killed. The insurgents stormed and destroyed two castles. The revolt was scotched by the troops of Albert III, Duke of Saxony when over 200 peasants were killed.
