= Apostolic Vicariate of Ravenstein-Megen =

Roman Catholic pre-diocesan jurisdiction in the Netherlands

The Apostolic Vicariate of Ravenstein-Megen was a short-lived pre-diocesan Latin Catholic jurisdiction in a small southern part of the Netherlands.

== History ==
Established on 1803.03.22 as Apostolic Vicariate (hence not entitled to a (titular) bishop) of Ravenstein–Megen, on territory split off from the Diocese of Liège, secularly belonging to two feudal components -after which it was named- of the Meierij van 's-Hertogenbosch of the Duchy of Brabant : the Countship of Megen and the Land of Ravenstein.

It was suppressed on 1853.03.04, its territory merged into the Diocese of ’s-Hertogenbosch.

== Ordinaries ==
(all Roman Rite)

Apostolic Vicars of Ravenstein–Megen

- François-Antoine-Marie de Méan (1802.04.18 – death 1831.01.15); previously Titular Bishop of Hippus (1785.12.19 – 1792.09.24) while Auxiliary Bishop of Liège (Luik/Lüttich, Belgium) (1785.12.19 – 1792.09.24), succeeding as Prince-Bishop of Liège ([1792.08.16] 1792.09.24 – 1802.04.18); retained this office when promoted Metropolitan Archbishop of Mechlin (now Mechelen-Brussel, Belgium) (1817.07.28 – death 1831.01.15)
- Father Arnoldus Borret (1831 – death 1839)
- Father Henricus van der Velden (1839 – death 1841), concurrently Apostolic Vicar of Grave–Nijmegen (Netherlands) (1840 – 1841)
- Apostolic Administrator 1842.01.24 – 1851 : Johannes Zwijsen, Titular Bishop of Gerrha (1842.01.24 – 1853.03.04), Ecclesiastical Superior of the Mission sui iuris of Batavia (Holland) (Netherlands) (1847 – 1848), Apostolic Vicar of Grave–Nijmegen (Netherlands) (1842.01.24 – 1851) and Coadjutor Apostolic Vicar of ’s-Hertogenbosch (Netherlands) (1842.01.24 – 1851.10.13); Founder of the Brothers of Our Lady, Mother of Mercy (of Tilburg) (1844.08.25); later succeeded as Apostolic Vicar of ’s-Hertogenbosch (Den Bosch, Netherlands) (1851.10.13 – 1853.03.04), promoted Metropolitan Archbishop of Utrecht (Netherlands) (1853.03.04 – 1868.03.13) and Archbishop-Bishop (first proper episcopal Ordinary) of the thus-elevated bishopric ’s-Hertogenbosch (1853.03.04 – death 1877.10.16)
