= Boudewijn Catz =

Dutch Catholic bishop

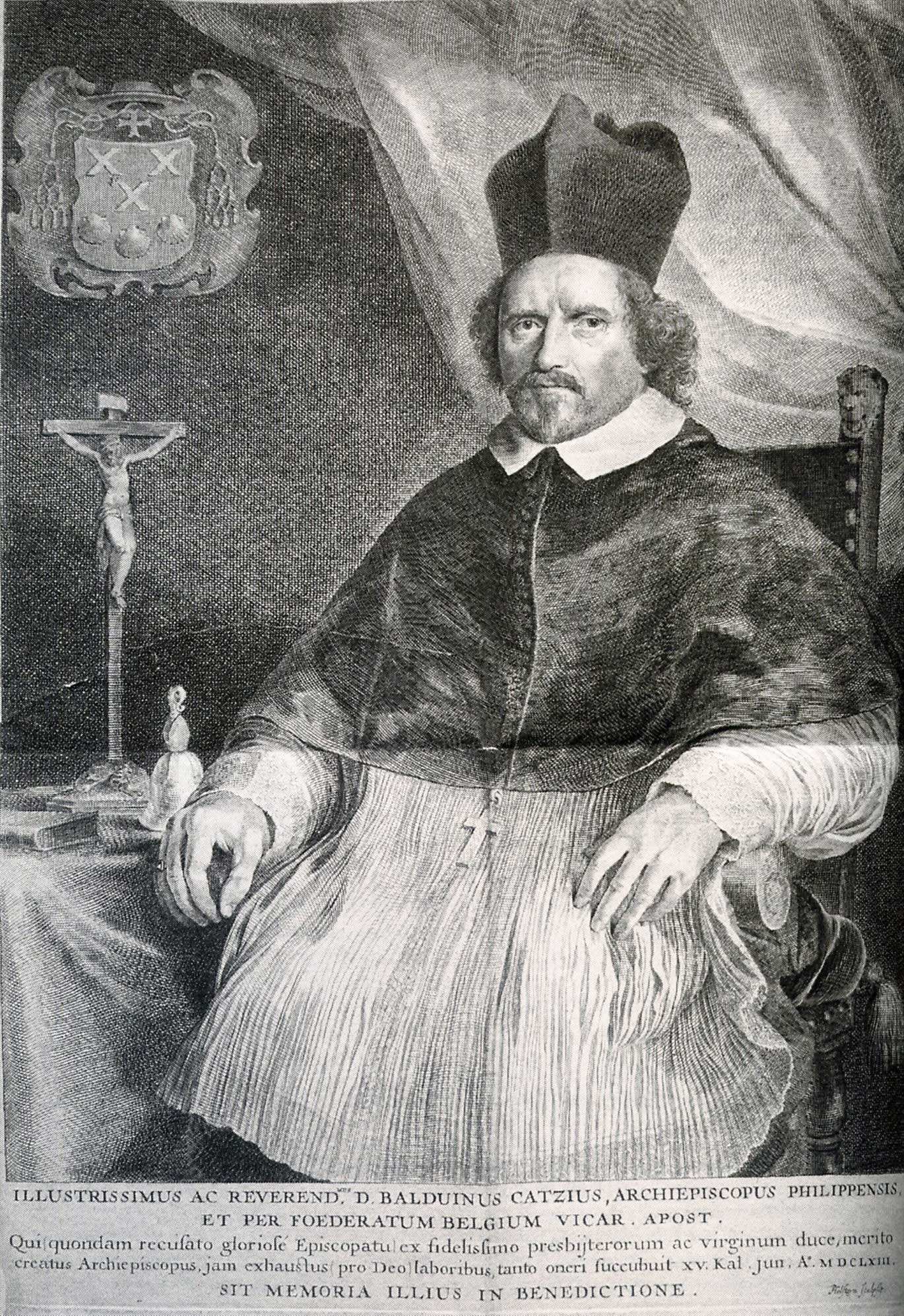
Boudewijn Catz

Boudewijn Catz or Cats (ca. 1601 – 18 May 1663) was apostolic vicar to the Dutch Mission from 1662 to 1663.

== Life ==
Catz was born in Gorinchem. He served as vicar to the Diocese of Haarlem. The Dutch Republic was an officially Protestant country where Catholicism was outlawed and reduced to a minority faith. In the 1630s, a series of portraits of the Haarlem Catholic clergy was commissioned as an act of patronage towards the local artists. The portraits were for the priests' living quarters next to the secret St. Bernardus church in de Hoek on the Bakenessergracht. In 1634 Pieter de Grebber painted Catz.

On the death of Jacobus de la Torre, Vicar Apostolic of the Dutch Mission, Catz was appointed his successor on 31 May 1662. On 9 September 1662, in Cologne he was consecrated titular archbishop of Philippi.

He already seems to have been mentally weak at the time of his appointment as vicar apostolic and died insane in Leuven. During his time as vicar apostolic he was wholly guided by his coadjutor, Van Neercassel, who succeeded him.

== Sources ==
- De Katholieke Encyclopaedie (Amsterdam, 1938)

Catholic Church titles
Preceded by Jacobus de la Torre	Vicar Apostolic to the Dutch Mission; 1662–1663	Succeeded by Johannes van Neercassel
