= Johannes van Neercassel =

Dutch Catholic clergyman (1626–1686)

- Bishop of Utrecht
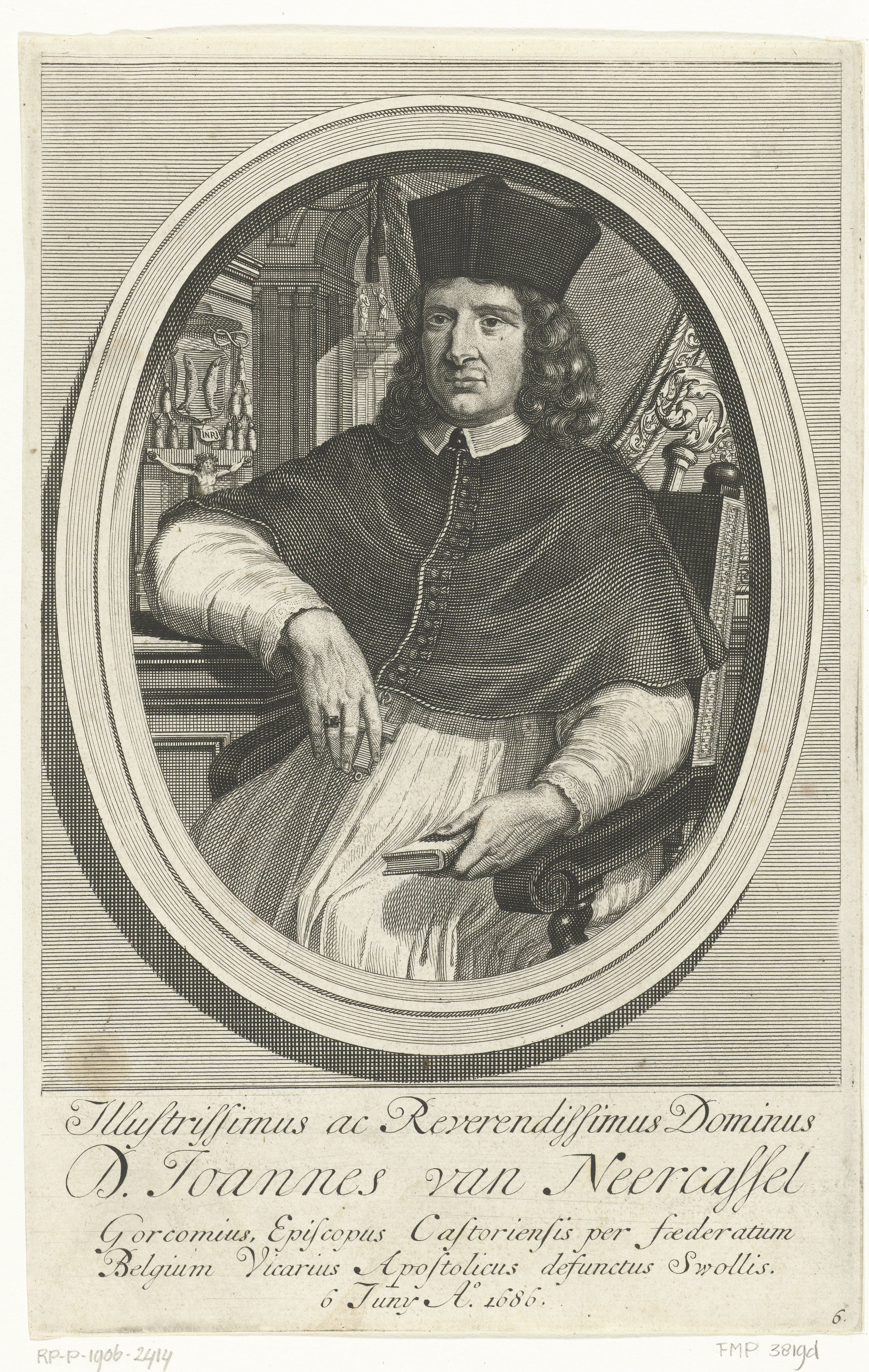
- Church: Catholic Church
- Diocese: Archdiocese of Utrecht
- In office: 1661–1686

Personal details
- Born: 1626 Gorkum, Netherlands
- Died: 6 June 1686

Johannes Baptista van Neercassel (Gorinchem, 1626 – Zwolle, 6 June 1686) served as apostolic vicar of the Dutch Mission, heir of the Roman Catholic Archdiocese of Utrecht, from 1661 to 1686.

== Life ==
Neercassel was born in Gorinchem, where his father was a wealthy brewer and city alderman. He probably received his first education from his uncle, who was a pastor, and continued his studies with the Crosiers at Cuijk. In 1642 he began his study of philosophy at Louvain where he lived at the Holland College. In 1645 he joined the Oratorians in Paris. He continued his theological studies at Saumur where he taught philosophy from 1647 to 1650. He was ordained priest probably in 1650 and taught philosophy at the Oratorian seminary in Paris.

=== Dutch mission ===
In 1652 Neercassel moved to the Oratory in Louvin, becoming lector in theology at the major seminary in Mechlin. He then worked as a chaplain in Rotterdam and Utrecht before becoming vicar general to Jacobus de la Torre, Apostolic Vicar of the Dutch Mission. In June 1662 he was appointed coadjutor to De la Torre's successor Boudewijn Catz and was consecrated titular bishop of Castorie. Neercassel very soon assumed administration of the mission when it became apparent that Catz was suffering from a mental illness. and was himself appointed vicar apostolic in 1663. The Dutch Republic was an officially Protestant country where Catholicism was outlawed and reduced to a minority faith. Neercassel maintained good relations with the civil authorities of the Dutch Republic, winning some degree of tolerance for Catholics.

Neercassel was an admirer of Charles Borromeo and shared the Archbishop of Milan's views of the necessity of improving the quality of the clergy, both educationally and morally. While Neercassel was a demanding bishop, he was no less demanding of himself, preaching, visiting parishes, and administering sacraments across the northern Netherlands. In 1670 he went to Rome to defend the interests of the secular clergy against those of the regulars, particularly the Jesuits and the Spanish ambassador.

His authority did not go unchallenged. As in England, the Catholic mission depended on lay support in the form of money, places of worship, and protection. Dutch historian L.J. Rogier said "...that the existence of Catholic enclaves in the nineteenth-century Netherlands was the result of the protection and patronage of missionary priests during the Dutch Republic by noble families who had, both secretly and openly, opposed the proselytising policies of the Calvinist authorities." Catholic noblemen, in turn, maintained that they enjoyed patronage rights over clandestine Catholic churches and chapels in their seigneuries, i.e., the right to nominate priests to these churches. Neercassel saw this as a matter of episcopal authority and refused to recognize any such right, holding that any such privilege was granted by the bishop, not inherited. Regular clergy were already established in cities such as Amsterdam and more rural communities had long relied on the ministry of monasteries. People developed strong ties with the regular clergy, whose support of the vicar, particularly among the Jesuits, was often less than enthusiastic. In 1684, Pope Innocent XI upheld Neercassel.

After the capture of Utrecht by the French in 1672, the French authorised Catholics to worship publicly. St. Martin's Cathedral was returned to Catholic use and Van Neercassel celebrated Mass there many times. On 22 August 1673 he even organised a major procession of the Holy Sacrament through the city streets. He hoped to re-establish Utrecht as an episcopal seat, but Rome showed much hesitation on the issue, the Holy See being unfavourable to the seat being restored under French protection.

The liberties Catholics had gained came to an end in 1673, when the French were forced to retreat from Utrecht. Although there was little thought of reprisals by the Protestants, Van Neercassel judged it expedient to leave the Dutch Republic temporarily, continuing the Mission's work first from Antwerp and later from Huissen, where he founded a Latin school in 1676. He died on a visitation trip to Zwolle on 6 June 1686 of complications from pneumonia.

A respected figure on the international stage, with an excellent network of contacts in France and Rome, Johannes van Neercassel represented spiritualist Jansenism and had good relations with Port-Royal. In time the Jesuits succeeded in undermining his position and his theological work Amor poenitens (1683) was put on the Index of Prohibited Books after his death.

== Sources ==
- De Katholieke Encyclopaedie (Amsterdam, 1938)
- M.Chr.M. Molenaar / G.A.M. Abbink, Dertienhonderd jaar bisdom Utrecht (Baarn, 1995)

Catholic Church titles
Preceded by Boudewijn Catz; 1662–1663	Archbishop of Utrecht; 1663–1686	Succeeded by Petrus Codde; 1688–1710
