= Ex qua die arcano =

Papal bull by Pius IX

Ex qua die arcano is the incipit of the 4 March 1853 apostolic letter by which Pope Pius IX decreed the reestablishment of the episcopal hierarchy in the Netherlands. Through it, the administrative area formerly known as the Dutch Mission (ruled directly between 1829 and 1853 by the apostolic internuncios in the The Hague) was divided into dioceses. Utrecht was raised, once more, to a Roman Catholic archdiocese, and received the four suffragan dioceses of Haarlem, 's-Hertogenbosch, Breda, and Roermond.
