= George van Egmond =

Bishop of Utrecht

- Bishop of Utrecht
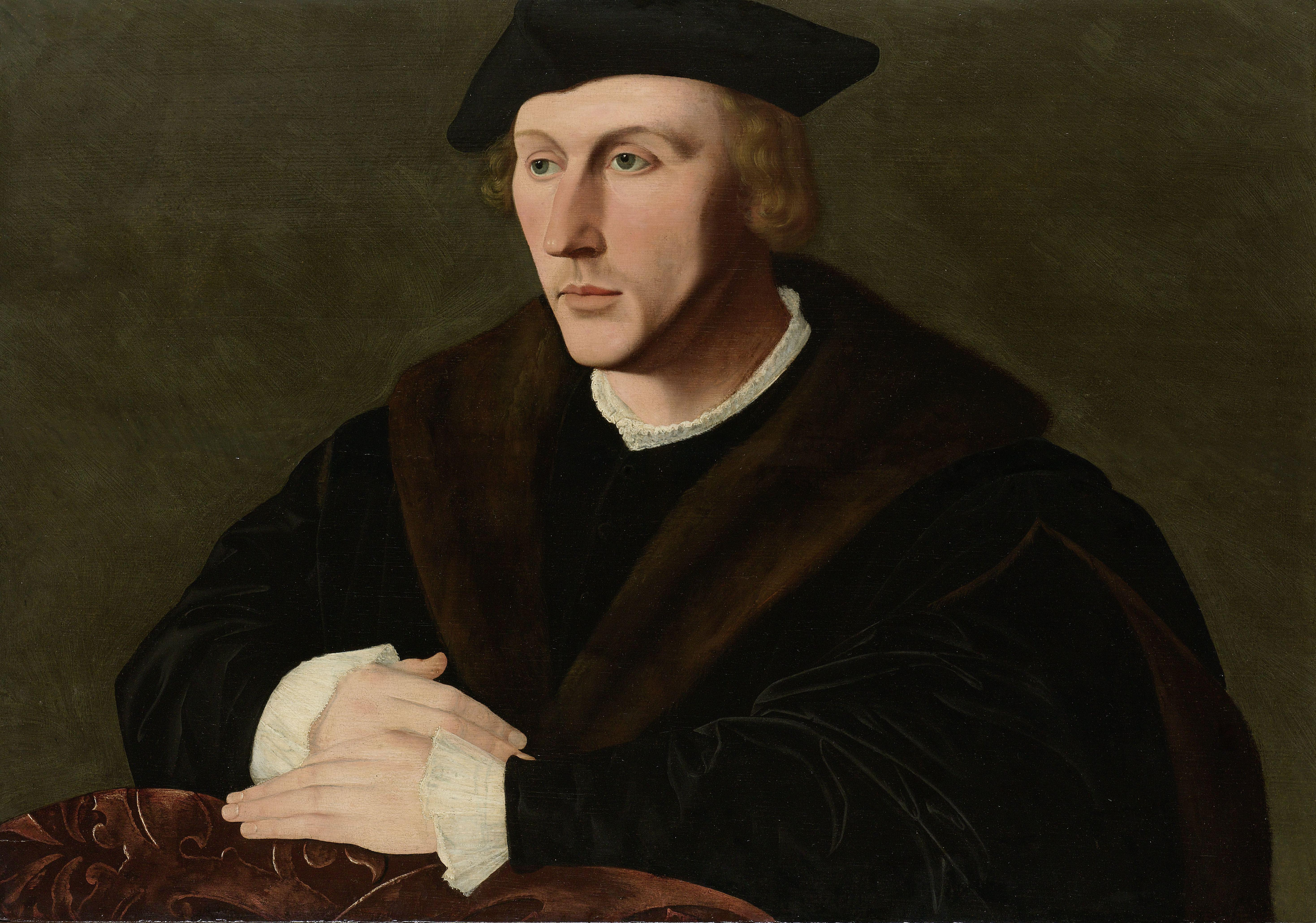
- Portrait by Jan van Scorel, c. 1535–1540
- Church: Catholic Church
- Diocese: Utrecht
- Appointed: 26 February 1535
- Term ended: 26 September 1559
- Predecessor: Willem van Enckevoirt
- Successor: Frederik V Schenck van Toutenburg

Personal details
- Born: 2 July 1504 Egmond
- Died: 26 September 1559 (aged 55) Saint-Amand Abbey
- Parents: John III of Egmont (father)
- Coat of arms

George or Joris van Egmont (2 July 1504, Egmond – 26 September 1559, Saint-Amand Abbey) was a Dutch nobleman who served as Bishop of Utrecht from 1535 until his death in 1559. Following the death of his predecessor, Willem van Enckevoirt, on 19 July 1534, Egmond was appointed Bishop by Emperor Charles V. Egmond's appointment was confirmed by Pope Paul III on 26 February 1535.

== Biography ==
George was the son of John III of Egmont. In 1526 he became canon and later deacon of the chapter of Liège. Next he became abbot of Saint-Amand Abbey (since destroyed in the wars of the Protestant Reformation and French Revolution) at Saint-Amand-les-Eaux, south of Tournai. Charles V, Holy Roman Emperor appointed him bishop of Utrecht in 1534 as a favour to the Dutch nobility. Because he had to be ordained as priest, his consecration as bishop was delayed for over a year. George stayed in Saint-Amand, and had a vicar manage the bishopric for him. He acted unsuccessfully against the rise of Calvinism.

== Legacy ==
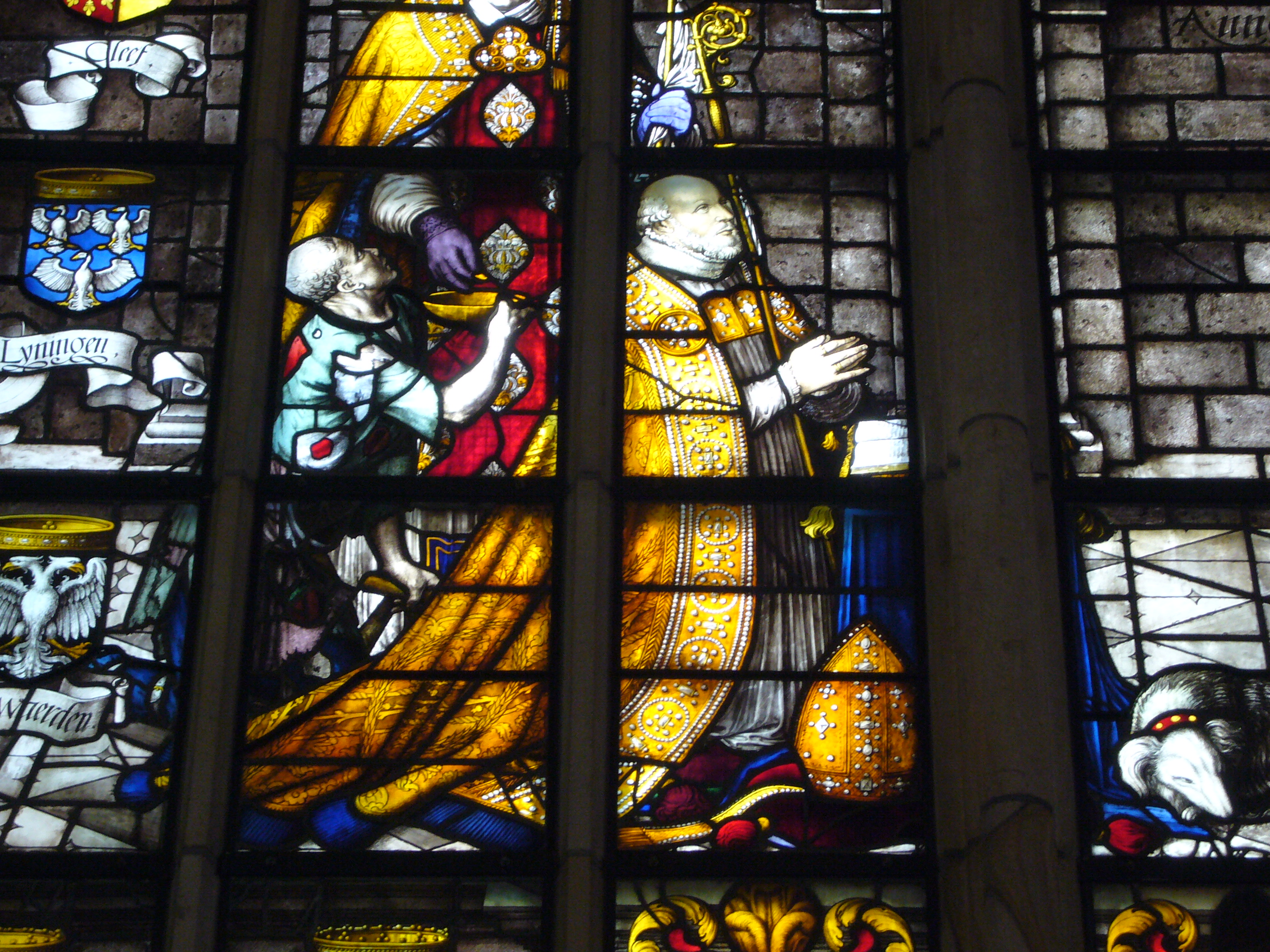
George van Egmont in prayer on the right side of a large stained glass window he donated to the Janskerk (Gouda).

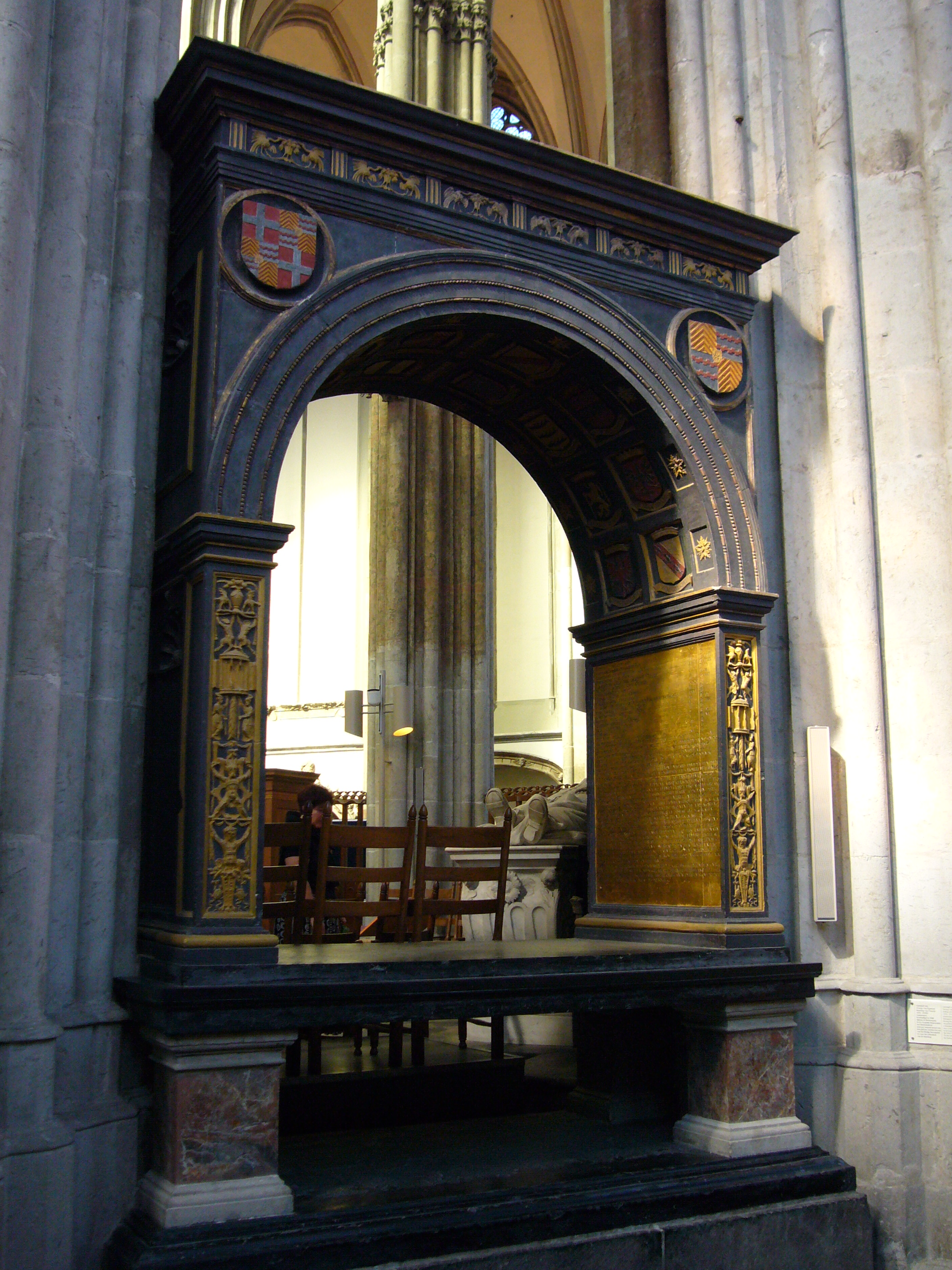
Cenotaph memorial to George van Egmont in St. Martin's Cathedral, Utrecht

The stained glass window he donated with the theme of the baptism of Christ still exists in the Janskerk in Gouda. This window was designed and made by Dirk Crabeth in 1557-8.

After his death he was buried in Saint-Amand Abbey, but his heart was interred in a cenotaph in St. Martin's Cathedral, Utrecht. A portrait of George van Egmont from c. 1535, painted by his friend Jan van Scorel, is located in the Rijksmuseum Amsterdam.

Catholic Church titles
| Preceded by William of Enckenvoirt | Bishop of Utrecht; 1535–1559 | Succeeded by Frederik V Schenck van Toutenburg |
