= Lebuïnuskerk, Deventer =

Dutch protestant church in Deventer, Netherlands

Coordinates: 52.2519°N 6.1551°E

Lebuïnuskerk in Deventer (2021)

The Great Church or St. Lebuinus Church (Dutch: Grote of Lebuïnuskerk) is the main church building of the Dutch city of Deventer, Netherlands.

== Overview ==
It is a Gothic hall church, built between 1450 and 1525.

Originally consecrated to the English missionary Lebuinus, it was one of the most distinguished churches of the Roman Catholic Archdiocese of Utrecht. This church was the Cathedral of the Diocese of Deventer, after the Papal bull Super universas between 1559 and 1591. In 1580 it was taken over by the Calvinists, who completely eliminated the interior decoration and renamed it the Great Church (Dutch: Grote Kerk).

Today, the temple belongs to the Protestant Church in the Netherlands, while the tower belongs to the Municipality.
