= Vitaliano Visconti =

Italian Catholic cardinal and archbishop

- Archbishop of Monreale
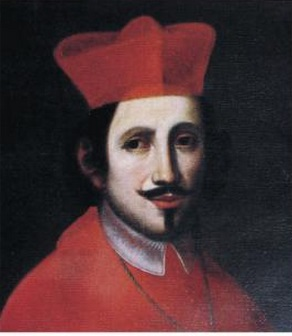
- Church: Catholic Church
- Archdiocese: Archdiocese of Monreale
- In office: 2 June 1670 – 7 September 1671
- Predecessor: Luis Alfonso de Los Cameros
- Successor: Juan Ruano Corrionero
- Other post: Cardinal-Priest of Sant'Agnese fuori le mura (1669-1671)
- Previous posts: Titular Archbishop of Ephesus (1664-1669); Apostolic Nuncio to Spain (1664-1668)

Orders
- Created cardinal: 15 February 1666 by Pope Alexander VII

Personal details
- Born: 1618 Milan, Duchy of Milan, Holy Roman Empire
- Died: 7 September 1671 (aged 52–53) Monreale, Kingdom of Sicily, Crown of Aragon

Vitaliano Visconti (Milan, 1618 – Monreale, 7 September 1671) was an Italian Catholic cardinal and archbishop.

== Biography ==
Vitaliano Visconti was born in Milan in 1618, the son of Count Fabio of the Genoese noble Bianca Spinola. He was admitted to law at the University of Bologna. A member of the College of Justice Consultants in Milan from 1644, deciding to embark on an ecclesiastical career and moved to Rome where he was honored with the titles of governor of the cities of Fano, Spoleto, Viterbo and Perugia. In those years he was sent by Pope Alexander VII in his representation to pay homage to the Infanta of Spain, the eldest son of King Philip IV.

Audience of the court of the Sacred Rota since 1660, he also became a hearer of the causes of the Apostolic Palace and accompanied Cardinal Flavio Chigi in his later legation to Paris.

Elected archbishop of Ephesus on 11 August 1664, he received a dispensation for not having received the presbytery and from 16 August of that same year was appointed an apostolic nuncio in Spain.

He was created cardinal by Pope Alexander VII on 15 February 1666 and published by the same Pontiff in the Consistory of 7 March 1667. He was unable to attend the conclave of 1667 that elected Pope Clement IX but on 18 March 1669 received the title bishop of Saint'Agnese outside the walls. He took part in the conclave of 1669-1670 that elected Pope Clement X and was transferred to the metropolitan headquarters of Monreale on 2 June 1670.

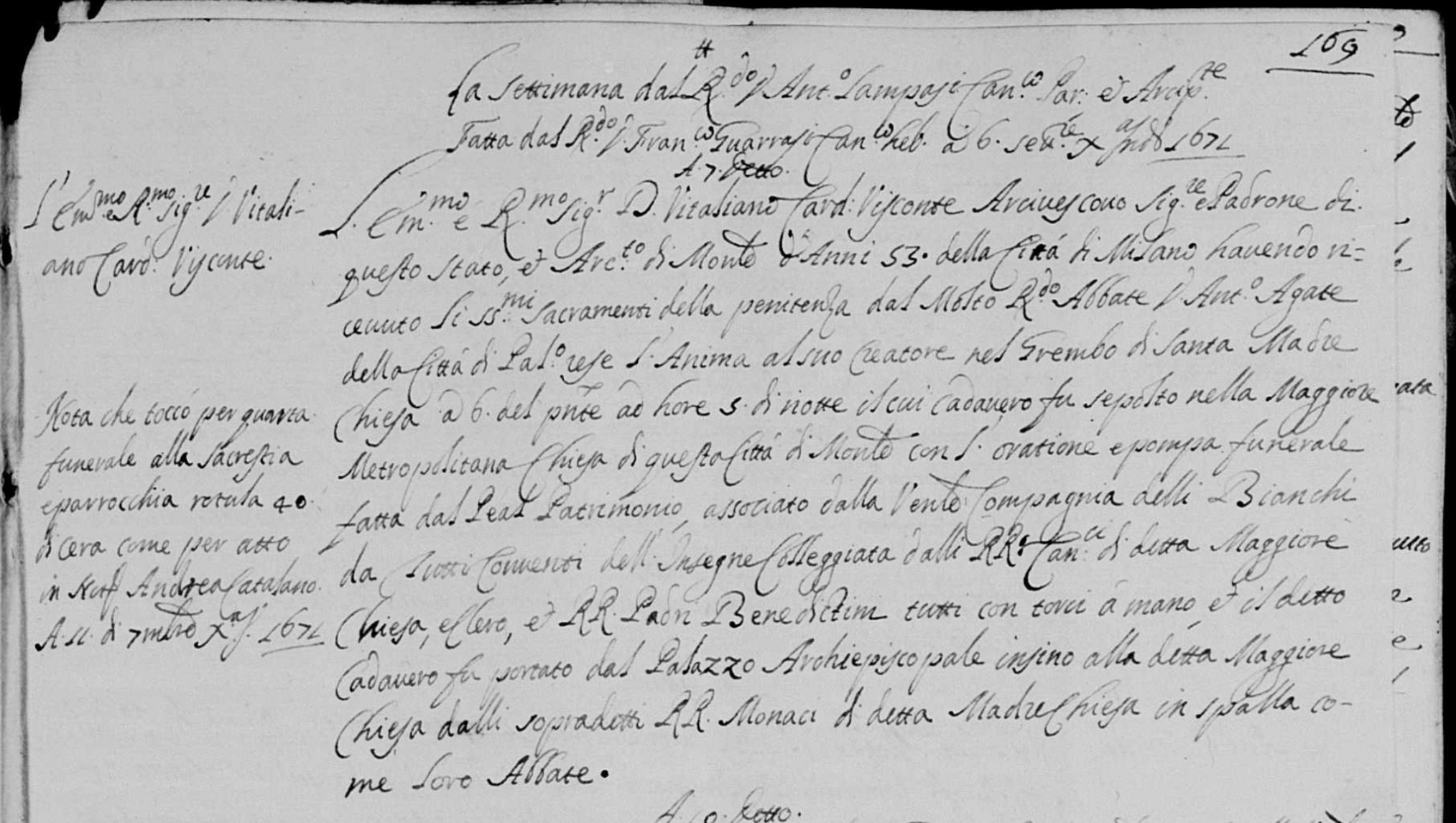
Death document of Vitaliano Visconti

He died at Monreale on 7 September 1671. The body was exposed to public veneration and then buried in the same cathedral.
