= Roman Catholic Diocese of Deventer =

Former Latin Catholic diocese in the Netherlands

Diocese of Deventer Bisdom Deventer
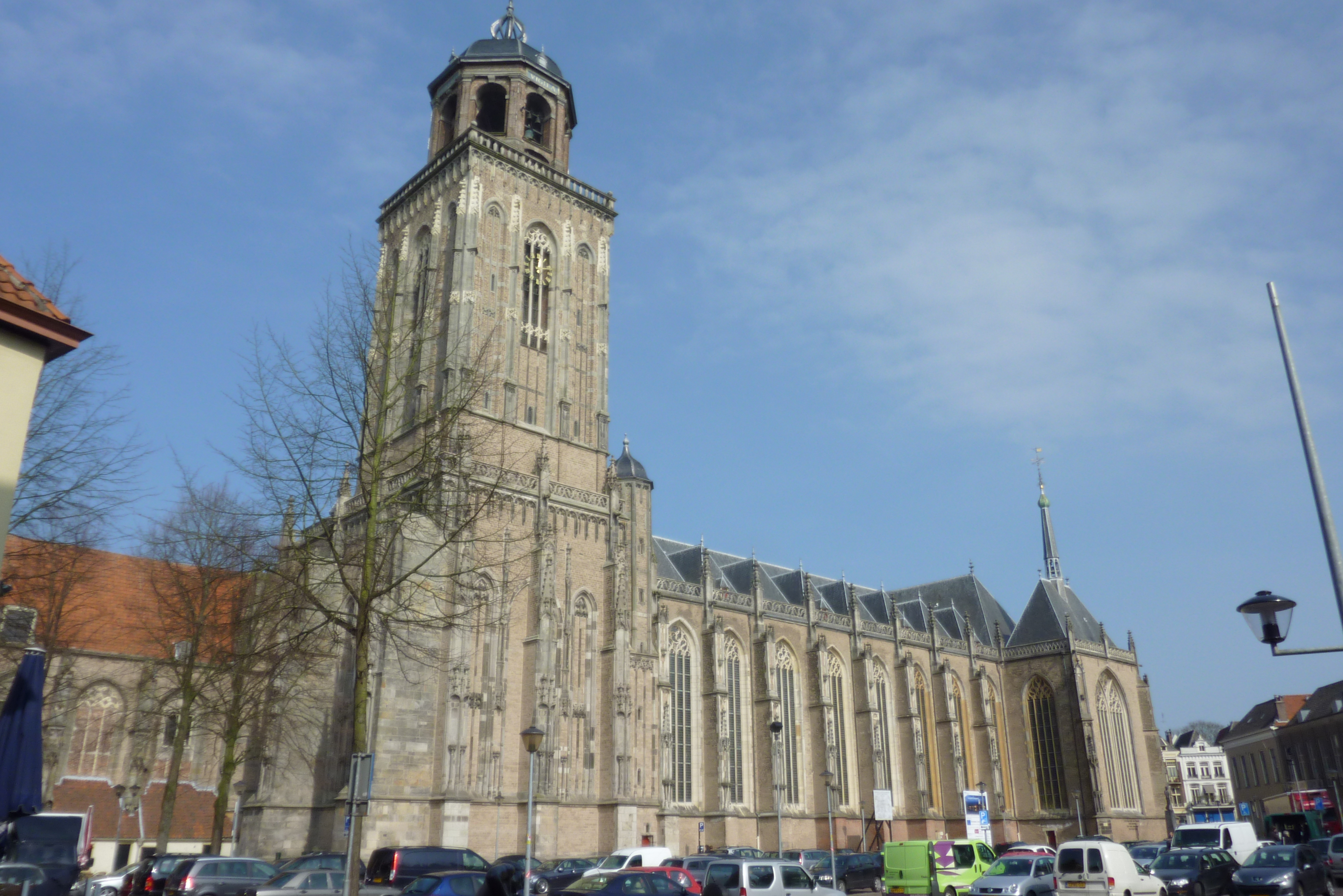
- Saint Lebuinus Church, the cathedral of the Diocese of Deventer, later taken by the Calvinists and now a Protestant Church named the Great Church

Location
- Country: Netherlands
- Territory: Overijssel, part of Guelders, and the counties of Zutphen, Bentheim, and Lingen.

Information
- Denomination: Catholic Church
- Sui iuris church: Latin Church
- Rite: Roman Rite
- Established: 1559. Suppressed in 1591

Map
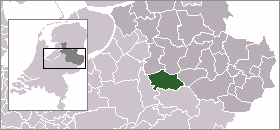
- Location of Deventer

The Diocese of Deventer is a suppressed former diocese of the Catholic Church in what is now the Netherlands. It was erected in 1559 as a suffragan see to the Diocese of Utrecht, which was raised to an Archdiocese at the same time, at the request of King Philip II of Spain. The Diocese of Deventer covered Overijssel, a part of Guelders and the counties of Zutphen, Bentheim and Lingen.

According to the 19th-century historian A.J. van der Aa, the first bishop appointed by Philip II was Johannes Mahusius, but he never occupied the post because of obstruction by the Estates, and he resigned in 1570 because of illness. He was succeeded by Egidius de Monte, who was established in Deventer by the Duke of Alva. After he died in 1589, Gijsbert Koeverinks was named as the third bishop of Deventer, but before he could be consecrated in 1591, Maurice of Nassau, Prince of Orange, conquered the city and the diocese ceased to exist.

Saint Lebuinus Church was the cathedral of the Diocese of Deventer. It was later taken in the revolt by the Calvinists. Today it is a Protestant church and is commonly known as the "Grote Kerk" (Great Church). It is located in the old town center in the market square along the IJssel River.
