= Petrus Codde =

Dutch Catholic clergyman (1648–1710)

- Bishop of Utrecht
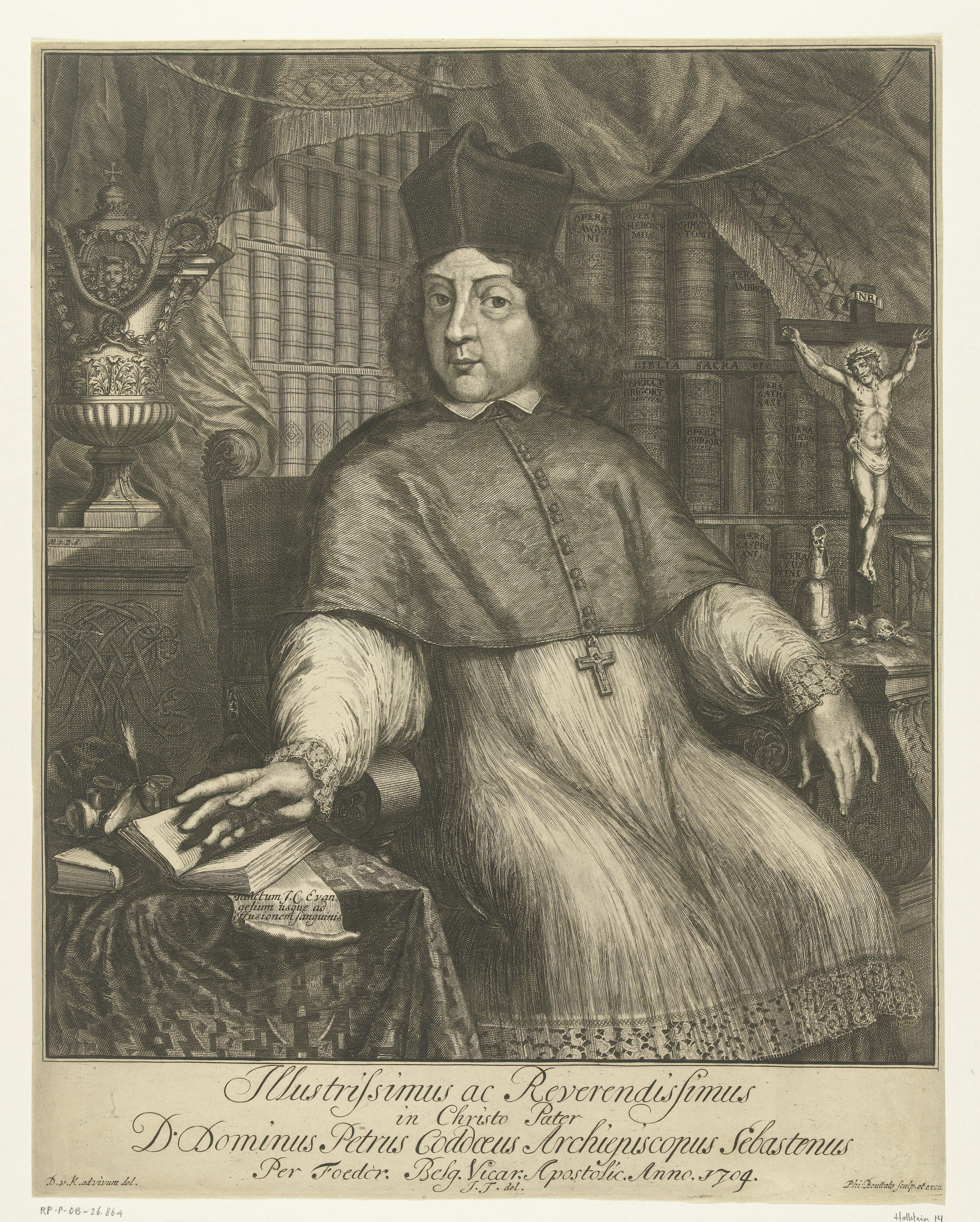
- Church: Catholic Church
- Diocese: Archdiocese of Utrecht
- In office: 1688–1702

Personal details
- Born: 27 November 1648
- Died: 18 December 1710 (aged 62)

Pieter Codde also known as Petrus Codde (27 November 1648, in Amsterdam – 18 December 1710, in Utrecht) was apostolic vicar of the Catholic Church's Vicariate Apostolic of Batavia, also known as the Dutch Mission, from 1688 to 1702. He served as the Archbishop of Utrecht from 1688 until his death in 1710.

== Life ==
Codde studied in Leuven, taught by the Oratorians, and was ordained priest in 1672. In 1688 he was named Vicar Apostolic for the nation (the Dutch Mission), although the Jesuits suspected and accused him of Jansenist sympathies. He had to justify himself to Rome against these accusations in 1694 and, after being charged with them a second time, in 1697. On the second occasion he went to Rome in person, but his apologia did not satisfy his critics and he was finally suspended from his office in 1702 by Pope Clement XI (with his definitive discharge from the post coming in 1704, thanks to the intervention of Giovanni Battista Bussi).

Jacques Forget wrote, in the Catholic Encyclopedia, that since the Dutch Republic was for the most part Protestant, Catholics there lived under the direction of vicars apostolic. These representatives of the pope were soon won over to the theological position of Jansenism. Johannes van Neercassel, who governed the whole church in the Netherlands from 1663 to 1686, made no secret of his intimacy with the party. Under Neercassel the country began to become the refuge of all whose obstinacy forced them to leave Kingdom of France and Spanish Netherlands as well as a number of priests, monks, and nuns who preferred exile to the acceptance of the pontifical Bulls.

Codde, who succeeded Neercassel in 1686 went further than his predecessor and refused to sign the formulary. He was summoned to Rome, defended himself so poorly that he was first forbidden to exercise his functions, and then deposed by a decree of 1704. Codde died obstinate in 1710.

== Notes ==
Catholic Church titles
Preceded by Johannes van Neercassel	Vicar Apostolic to the Dutch Mission; 1688–1702	Succeeded by Theodorus de Kock
Preceded by Johannes van Neercassel; 1661-1686	Old Catholic Archbishop of Utrecht; 1688–1710	Succeeded by Cornelius van Steenoven; 1724-1725
