= Valkenisse, Zuid-Beveland =

Coordinates: 51.3980°N 4.0710°E

Valkenisse is a former village in the Dutch province of Zeeland.

The village was repeatedly flooded in the 16th and 17th century, and was finally abandoned after the flood of 26 January 1682.

The small remaining part of the domain of Valkenisse was a separate municipality until 1816, when it was merged with Waarde.

The sandbanks in the Westerschelde south of Krabbendijke, the Platen van Valkenisse, are named after the village.
