= Dutch Mission =

Catholic missionary district in the Netherlands after the Protestant Reformation

The Holland Mission or Dutch Mission (Dutch: Hollandse Zending or Hollandse Missie) was the common name of a Catholic Church missionary district in the Low Countries from 1592 to 1853, during and after the Protestant Reformation in the Netherlands.

== History ==
=== Pre-reformation diocese and archdiocese of Utrecht ===
According to the Catholic Encyclopedia, the founding of the diocese of Utrecht dates back to Francia, when St. Ecgberht of Ripon sent St. Willibrord and eleven companions on a mission to pagan Frisia, at the request of Pepin of Herstal. The Diocese of Utrecht (Latin: Dioecesis Ultraiectensis) was erected by Pope Sergius I in 695. In 695 Sergius consecrated Willibrord in Rome as Bishop of the Frisians.

George Edmundson wrote, in Encyclopædia Britannica, 1911 edition, that the bishops, in fact, as the result of grants of immunities by a succession of German kings, and notably by the Saxon and Franconian emperors, gradually became the temporal rulers of a dominion as great as the neighboring counties and duchies. John Mason Neale explained, in History of the so-called Jansenist church of Holland, that bishops "became warriors rather than prelates; the duties of their pastoral office were frequently exercised by suffragans, while they themselves headed armies against the Dukes of Guelders or the Counts of Holland." Adalbold II of Utrecht "must be regarded as the principal founder of the territorial possessions of the diocese," according to Albert Hauck, in New Schaff–Herzog Encyclopedia of Religious Knowledge, especially by the acquisition in 1024 and 1026 of the counties of Drenthe and Teisterbant; but, the name "Bishopric of Utrecht" is not used in the article. Debitum pastoralis officii nobis was Pope Leo X's 1517 prohibition to the Archbishop-Elector of Cologne, Hermann of Wied, as legatus natus, (Note: "As papal power increased after the middle of the eleventh century these legates came to have less and less real authority and eventually the legatus natus was hardly more than a title.") to summon, to a court of first instance in Cologne, Philip of Burgundy, his treasurer, and his ecclesiastical and secular subjects. (Note: Joosting and Muller noted that Leo X also promulgated another bull, in which he commissioned that the Bishop of Utrecht, his treasurer and his subjects informed that they were empowered to disregard privileges formerly granted to others and to prosecute offenders while setting aside formerly specified legal process.) Leo X only confirmed a right of the Church, explained Neale; but Leo X's confirmation "was providential" in respect to the future schism. The Bishopric ended when Henry of the Palatinate resigned the see in 1528 with the consent of the cathedral chapter, and transferred his secular authority to Charles V, Holy Roman Emperor. The chapters voluntarily transferred their right of electing the bishop to Charles V, and Pope Clement VII gave his consent to the proceeding. George Edmundson wrote, in History of Holland, that Henry, "was compelled" in 1528 to formally surrender "the temporalities of the see" to Charles V.

=== Lordship of Utrecht ===
The diocese was elevated to an archdiocese in 1559. It was taken from Province of Cologne, in which it was a suffragan, and elevated to the rank of an archdiocese and metropolitan see. During the administration of the first archbishop, Frederik V Schenck van Toutenburg, Calvinism spread rapidly, especially among the nobility, who viewed with disfavor the endowment of the new bishoprics with the ancient and wealthy abbeys. The parish churches were attacked in the Beeldenstorm in 1566. The hanging of the nineteen Martyrs of Gorkum in Brielle in 1572 is an example of the persecution which Catholics suffered. During the Dutch Revolt in the Spanish Netherlands, the archdiocese fell. In the Beeldenstorm in 1580, the collegiate churches were victims of iconoclastic attacks and St. Martin's Cathedral, Utrecht, was "severely damaged". "Even though approximately one third of the people remained Roman Catholic and in spite of a relatively great tolerance," as early as 1573, the public exercise of Catholicism was forbidden, and the cathedral was converted into a Protestant church in 1580. The cathedral chapter survived and "still managed its lands and formed part of the provincial government" in the Lordship of Utrecht. "The newly appointed canons, however, were always Protestants." The two successor archbishop appointed by Spain neither received canonical confirmation nor could they enter their diocese because of the States-General opposition. The archdiocese was suppressed in 1580. Walter Phillips wrote, in Encyclopædia Britannica, 1911 edition, the last archbishop of Utrecht, Frederik V Schenck van Toutenburg, died in 1580, "a few months before the suppression of Roman Catholic public worship" by William I, Prince of Orange. "Suppression of dioceses," wrote Hove, "takes place only in countries where the faithful and the clergy have been dispersed by persecution," the suppressed dioceses become missions, prefectures, or vicariates apostolic. This is what occurred in the Dutch Republic. (Note: Changes of this nature were not regulated by canon law, according to Hove who wrote in 1909.)

=== Apostolic Vicariate of Batavia ===
The Holland Mission started when the apostolic vicariate was erected by Pope Clement VIII in 1592. "For two centuries after the [1648] Peace of Westphalia much of Holland was under apostolic vicars as mission territory, as England was in the same period; although some areas had archpriests dependent on the nuncios in Cologne and Brussels."

In the early 18th century there was a grave internal conflict around the apostolic vicars Johannes van Neercassel and Petrus Codde, who were accused of Jansenism. This resulted in the founding of the Old Catholic Church of Utrecht in 1723, a schism of several thousand leading Dutch Catholics breaking with the Holy See. In 1725, in an attempt to stimulate the schismatic church and weaken the Catholic presence in the Netherlands, the Calvinist States General banned the apostolic vicars from the United Republic.

=== Mission sui iuris of Batavia ===
The vicariate was reduced to a mission sui iuris by Pope Benedict XIII in 1727.it was ruled by the Apostolic Nuncios in Bruxelles until 1794, and by the Apostolic Inter-Nuncios in the Netherlands between 1829 and 1853.

The feudal Lordship of Utrecht was disestablished when the Batavian Republic was created in 1795. There was an official freedom of religion. Churches did not have to be hidden anymore, new seminaries for priests were founded, and several monasteries were reinstated, especially after the Concordat with King William I of Netherlands in 1827.

The Holland Mission ended when the mission sui iuris was suppressed and the modern ecclesiastical province was erected in 1853.

=== Modern Dutch ecclesiastical province of Utrecht ===
The modern Metropolitan Roman Catholic Archdiocese of Utrecht was erected by Pope Pius IX in 1853 from the territory of the mission during a restructuring which erected its ecclesiastical province, the sole one for the Kingdom of the Netherlands. His 1853 papal letter Ex qua die arcano marked the reestablishment of the episcopal hierarchy in the Netherlands. The city of Utrecht was raised, once more, to a Roman Catholic archdiocese and received the four suffragan dioceses of Haarlem, 's-Hertogenbosch, Breda and Roermond. Joannes Zwijsen was appointed the first modern archbishop and was also apostolic administrator of the Diocese of 's-Hertogenbosch.

In 1858; the cathedral chapters of the dioceses were organized and in 1864 the first provincial synod was held.

== List of Apostolic Vicars ==
=== Apostolic Vicars in Utrecht ===
- Sasbout Vosmeer (1584–1614)
- Philippus Rovenius (1614–1651)
- Jacobus de la Torre (1652–1660)
- Boudewijn Catz (1661–1663)
- Johannes van Neercassel (1663–1686)
- Petrus Codde (1688–1702/1704)
- Theodorus de Kock (1702–1704)
- Gerhard Potcamp (1705)
- Adam Daemen (1707–1717)
- Johannes van Bijlevelt (1717–1725)

=== Apostolic Vicars administrating from Brussels ===
- Joseph Spinelli (1725–1731)
- Vincentius Montalto (1731–1732)
- Silvester Valenti Gonzaga (1732–1736)
- Franciscus Goddard (1736–1737)
- Lucas Melchior Tempi (1737–1743)
- Petrus Paulus Testa (1744)
- Ignatius Crivelli (1744–1755)
- Carolus Molinari (1755–1763)
- Batholomeus Soffredini (1763)
- Thomas Maria Ghilini (1763–1775)
- Joannes Antonius Maggiora (1775–1776)
- Ignatius Busca (1776–1785)
- Michael Causati (1785–1786)
- Antonius Felix Zondadari (1786–1790)
- Caesar di Brancadoro (1792–1794)

=== Head of the Mission ===
- Ludovicus Ciamberlani (1794–1828)

=== Apostolic Inter-Nuncios in the Netherlands ===
- Franciscus Cappacini (1829–1831)
- Antonius Antonucci (1831–1841)
- Innocentius Ferrieri (1841–1847)
- Joannes Zwijsen (1847–1848)
- Carolus Belgrado (1848–1853)

== See also ==
- Act of Abjuration
- Counter-Reformation
- Eighty Years' War
- Habsburg Netherlands
- History of religion in the Netherlands
- William the Silent
