= Frederik V Schenck van Toutenburg =

Dutch Roman Catholic bishop

The Most Reverend Frederik Schenck van Toutenburg
- Archbishop of Utrecht
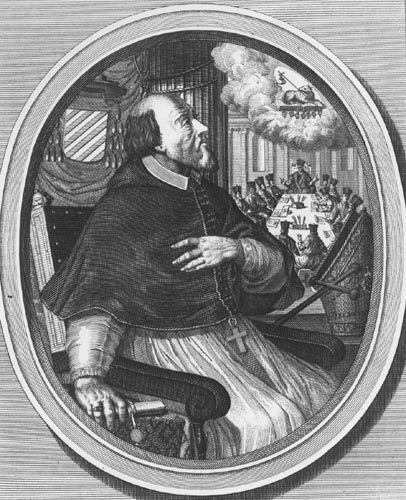
- Frederik Schenck van Toutenburg (Source: Het Utrechts Archief)
- Church: Roman Catholic
- Archdiocese: Utrecht
- In office: 1559–1580
- Predecessor: George van Egmond (bishop)
- Successor: Sasbout Vosmeer

Personal details
- Born: c. 1503 Vollenhove
- Died: 25 August 1580 Utrecht, Lordship of Utrecht
- Buried: St. Martin's Cathedral
- Parents: Georg Schenck van Toutenburg (father)

Frederik Schenck van Toutenburg (c. 1503 – 25 August 1580) was the first Archbishop of Utrecht from 1559 to 1580. Prior to Schenck's ministry as archbishop, Utrecht was a bishopric with a succession of sixty bishops. The last bishop of Utrecht, prior to Schenck was George van Egmond. After Schenck's death in 1580, the see would remain vacant until Sasbold Vosmeer assumed the archbishopric in 1602.

== Biography ==
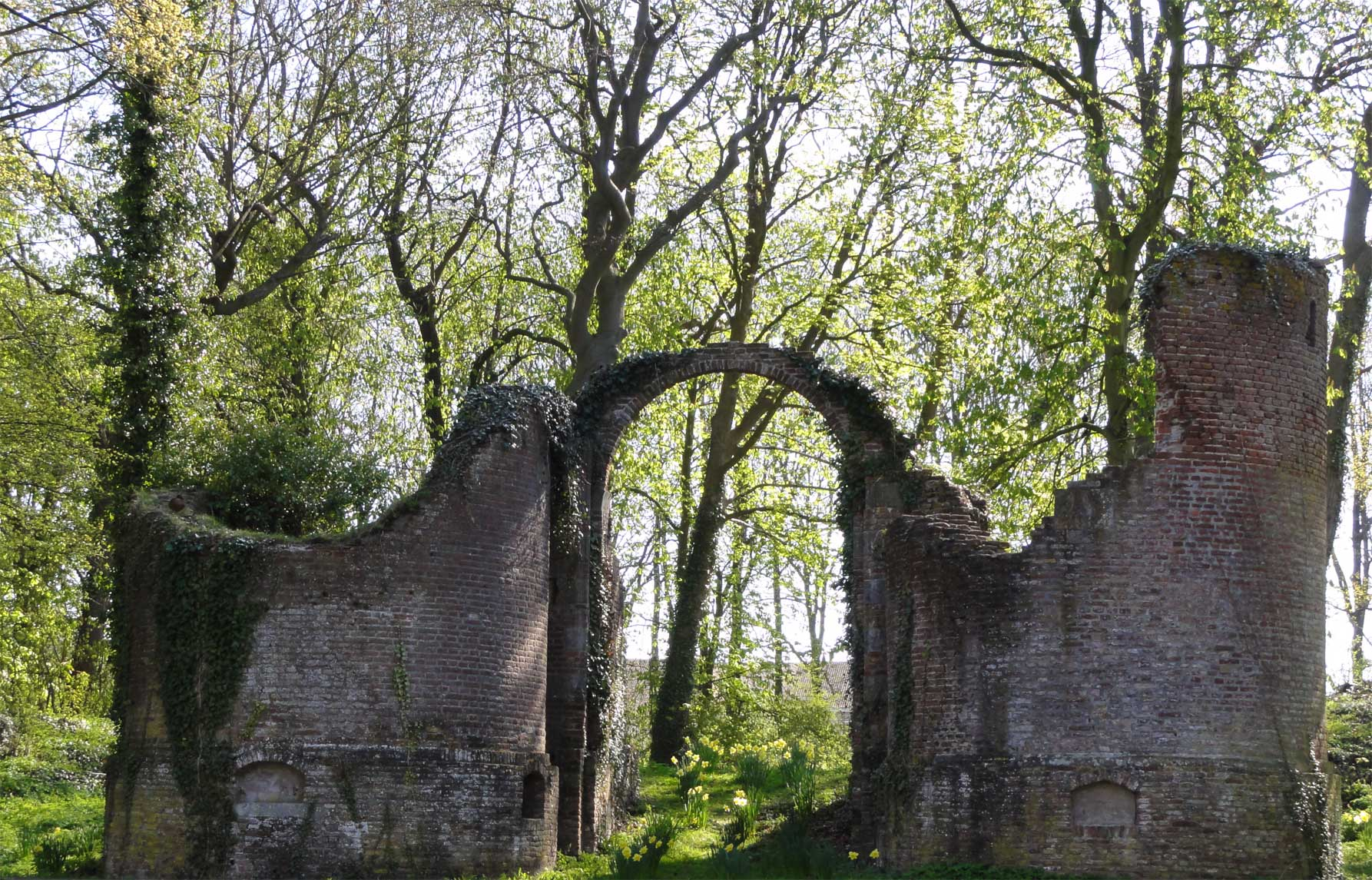
Remains of Castle Niew Toutenburg in Vollenhove, built by his father during the years 1524 and 1552

Frederik Schenk van Toutenburg born around 1503 in Vollenhove. He was the son of Georg Schenck van Toutenburg, and graduated in law at the Reichskammergericht in Speyer. After being made a priest, he became archdeacon of the Pieterskerk in Bishopric of Utrecht and priest at the Sint-Plechelmusbasiliek in Oldenzaal. He spent his time writing tracts on church law until he was promoted to the Dutch episcopate in 1559 by Philip II, who named him as the very first Archbishop of Utrecht (which was then confirmed in 1561 by Pope Pius IV). Until that time, the Bishopric of Utrecht reported to the Archbishop of Cologne. By agreement between Philip II and Rome in the spirit of the Counter-Reformation, the low countries (at that time a loose set of Seventeen Provinces) received its own archbishoprics, which besides Utrecht were Mechelen and Cambrai. This was an attempt to give the various parts of the low countries some self-government as a way of fending off the Protestant Reformation. These measures were not very successful, and Scheck van Toutenburg's archbishopric saw the Catholic reaction against the Council of Trent in the northern Netherlands. Governor Margaret of Parma forced him to lead support for the decrees of the Council of Trent and led him to call a provincial synod in 1565. The clergy and canons were fiercely opposed to the new disciplinary measures and tried to frustrate their introduction, but Schenck van Toutenburg used his power to break the opposition and to give leadership in the fight against Protestantism.

== Protestant Reformation ==
Schenck van Toutenburg was unable to unite the Catholics under his archbishopric. Under his tenure, many good Catholic Utrechters became Crypto-Protestants. As the Dutch Revolt began and William the Silent, stadtholder since 1559, fled, Maximilien de Hénin-Liétard was named the official stadtholder of the Netherlands in 1567 with his base in Utrecht at Vredenburg Castle. Like Schenck van Toutenburg, he met with insurrection with those under his command. After unsuccessfully preventing the Capture of Brielle in April–June 1572, he convened a meeting of the States General in The Hague in July 1572, but many representatives convened a new meeting in Dordrecht later that month, in which they pledged allegiance to William the Silent (or now, William of Orange). As the country turned to Protestantism and the Orange sympathies grew, Hénin-Liétard was taken prisoner at the Battle on the Zuiderzee on 11 October 1573. His Spanish troops based at Vredenburg thus lost their local leader.

The nearby city of Oudewater was massacred by Spanish troops for its participation in rebellion on 7 August 1575. Only those who could pay ransom money escaped. This shocked many leading Utrecht burgers. Though Hénin-Liétard was released as a term of treaty in the Pacification of Ghent in 1576, he no longer had command of Vredenburg and chose the side of William of Orange. This caused a problem of loyalties among the Spanish stationed at Utrecht. The city council of Utrecht sent representatives to Archbishop Schenk van Toutenburg to borrow money to pay the Spanish mercenaries at Vredenburg who had as a result pointed their canons at the city itself. These Spanish troops still had no leader and worse, had not been paid. Schenk van Toutenburg refused to pay, and the city fathers forced the lock on his money chest to "loan" 40,000 guilders. This was the end of Utrecht's allegiance with Catholicism, as they feared a fate like Oudewater. In June 1580 the city council of Utrecht decided to ban Catholic services in Utrecht. The archbishop died later that summer, on 25 August.

== Legacy ==
He became the first and last Archbishop of Utrecht until 1853. The Cathedral of Utrecht was closed from June 1580 onwards, though Roman Catholics still received permission to bury their dead (including their late archbishop) in the cathedral. Schenck van Toutenburg's funeral ceremony on 30 August 1580 was the last Catholic service in Utrecht for a long while and was disturbed by Protestants, who sang their version of Psalm 130 against the Catholic version ("De Profundis"). After Schenck's death, the archbishopric would remain vacant until the election of Sasbout Vosmeer in 1602.

Catholic Church titles
Preceded by New creation / George van Egmond (as bishop)	Archbishop of Utrecht; 1559–1580	Succeeded by Sasbout Vosmeer; 1602–1614
