= List of Catholic dioceses in Belgium =

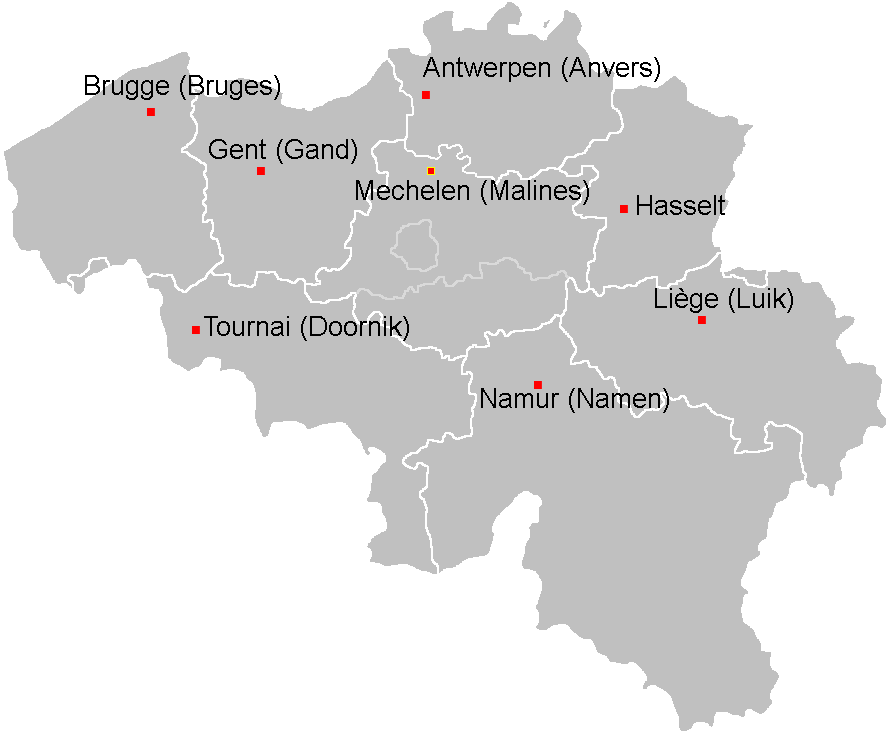
Roman Catholic dioceses in Belgium

A diocese, also known as a bishopric, is an administrative unit under the supervision of a bishop, of which there are currently 8 in the Belgian Catholic Church. The 8 dioceses are divided into 1 ecclesiastical province and 7 suffragan dioceses, but also one military ordinariate, which was created as military vicariate in 1957, and elevated to a military ordinariate in 1986.

Since December 1961, following the restructuring of the Catholic dioceses in Belgium, the Archdiocese of Mechelen was renamed the Archdiocese of Mechelen-Brussels. This newly created archdiocese is the primatial see of Belgium and the center of the ecclesiastical province governed by the Archdiocese of Mechelen-Brussels, which covers the whole of Belgium.

There are also a few former Roman Catholic dioceses in Belgium, including the Dioceses of Eupen-Malmedy and Ypres, but also the ancient Diocese of Thérouanne. The latter was split between the Dioceses of Saint-Omer, Boulogne and Ypres after the Council of Trent's reform of sees.

In Belgium, most dioceses coincide with a province, but there are a few exceptions.

== List of Roman Catholic dioceses in Belgium ==
=== Ecclesiastical Province of Mechelen-Brussels ===
Diocese	Coat of arms	Territory	Cathedral	Bishop (consecration)	Founded
Antwerp		Province of Antwerp (except for 9 municipalities)	Cathedral of Our Lady (1559-1801; since 1961)	Johan Bonny (2009)	1961 (restored)
Bruges		Province of West Flanders	St. Salvator's Cathedral (since 1834)	Lodewijk Aerts (2016)	1834 (restored)
Hasselt		Province of Limburg	St. Quentin's Cathedral (since 1967)	Patrick Hoogmartens (2004)	1967
Ghent		Province of East Flanders	St. Bavo's Cathedral (since 1559)	vacant	1559
Liège		Province of Liège	St. Paul's Cathedral (since 1794)	Jean-Pierre Delville (2013)	4th century (Civitas Tungrorum)
Mechelen-Brussels		Mechelen, Brussels-Capital Region, Flemish Brabant and Walloon Brabant	St. Rumbold (Mechelen) (Primatial cathedral); St. Michael and Gudula (Brussels) (Co-cathedral)	Luc Terlinden (2023)	1559
Namur		Namur and Luxembourg	St Aubin's Cathedral	Fabien Lejeusne, AA (2025)	1559
Tournai		Hainaut	Cathedral of Our Lady	Frédéric Rossignol, C.S.Sp. (2025)	1146

=== Exempt (directly subject to the Holy See) ===
Diocese	Flag	Jurisdiction	Seat	Ordinary	Founded
Military Ordinariate		Members of Belgian Armed Forces and their families	Church of St. James on Coudenberg	vested in the Archbishop of Mechelen-Brussels	1957

== See also ==
- List of Catholic churches in Belgium
