= List of archbishops of Mechelen-Brussels =

Coordinates: 51°01′48″N 4°28′44″E

The archbishop of Mechelen-Brussels is the head of the Archbishopric of Mechelen-Brussels of the Catholic Church in Belgium. It currently encompasses all of Belgium, making them the head of the Roman Catholic faith in the country.

The current archbishop is Luc Terlinden.

== Ordinaries ==
- Antoine Perrenot de Granvelle (1561–1582)
- Joannes Hauchin (1583–1589)
- Mathias Hovius (1596–1620)
- Jacobus Boonen (1621–1655)
- Andreas Creusen (1657–1666)
- Joannes Wachtendonck (1667–1668)
- Alphonse de Berghes (1670–1689)
- Humbertus Guilielmus de Precipiano (1690–1711)
- Thomas Philip Wallrad de Hénin-Liétard d'Alsace (1715–1759)
- Joannes-Henricus de Franckenberg (1759–1801)
- Jean-Armand de Bessuéjouls Roquelaure (1802–1809)
- Dominique-Georges-Frédéric Dufour de Pradt (1809–1817)
- François Antoine Marie Constantin de Méan et de Beaurieux (1817–1831)
- Engelbert Sterckx (1832–1867)
- Victor-Auguste-Isidore Dechamps (1867–1883)
- Pierre-Lambert Goosens (1884–1906)
- Desiré-Félicien-François-Joseph Mercier (1906–1926)
- Jozef-Ernest van Roey (1926–1961)
- Leo Joseph Suenens (1962–1980)
- Godfried Danneels (1980–2010)
- André-Mutien Léonard (2010– 2015)
- Jozef De Kesel (2015–2023)
- Luc Terlinden (2023–present)

== See also ==
- Archbishopric of Mechelen-Brussels
