= Leo Joseph Suenens =

Catholic cardinal

His Eminence Leo Jozef Suenens
- Cardinal; Archbishop Emeritus of Mechelen-Brussels; Primate Emeritus of Belgium
- Church: Catholic Church
- Archdiocese: Mechelen-Brussels
- See: Mechelen-Brussels
- Appointed: 24 November 1961
- Term ended: 4 October 1979
- Predecessor: Jozef-Ernest van Roey
- Successor: Godfried Danneels
- Other post: Cardinal-Priest of San Pietro in Vincoli (1962–1996)
- Previous posts: Titular Bishop of Isinda (1945–1961); Auxiliary Bishop of Mechelen (1945–1961); President of the Belgian Episcopal Conference (1961–1979); Military Vicar of Belgium (1962–1979)

Orders
- Ordination: 4 September 1927 by Jozef-Ernest van Roey
- Consecration: 16 December 1945 by Jozef-Ernest van Roey
- Created cardinal: 19 March 1962 by Pope John XXIII
- Rank: Cardinal-Priest

Personal details
- Born: Leo Jozef Suenens; 16 July 1904 Ixelles, Kingdom of Belgium
- Died: 6 May 1996 (aged 91) Brussels, Kingdom of Belgium
- Parents: Jean-Baptiste Suenens; Jeanne Janssens
- Education: Pontifical Gregorian University
- Motto: In Spiritu Sancto
- Coat of arms: Leo Jozef Suenens's coat of arms

Leo Jozef Suenens (/ˈsuːnɛns/ SOO-nens) (16 July 1904 – 6 May 1996) was a Belgian Catholic prelate who served as Archbishop of Mechelen-Brussels from 1961 to 1979. He was elevated to the cardinalate in 1962.

Suenens was a leading voice at the Second Vatican Council advocating for reform in the Church.

== Biography ==
=== Early life and education ===
Leo Suenens was born at Ixelles, the only child of Jean-Baptiste and Jeanne (née Janssens) Suenens. He was baptised by his uncle, who was a priest. Losing his father (who had owned a restaurant) at age four, Leo lived with his mother in the rectory of his priest-uncle from 1911 to 1912. Wealthy relatives wanted him to study economics and manage their fortune, but he chose the priesthood. He studied at Saint Mary's Institute in Schaerbeek and then entered the Pontifical Gregorian University in Rome in 1920, residing in the Belgian Pontifical College, where he also served as librarian. From the Gregorian he obtained a doctorate in theology and in philosophy (1927), and a master's degree in canon law (1929). Suenens had taken as his mentor Cardinal Désiré-Joseph Mercier, who had also sent him to Rome.

=== Priesthood ===
Ordained to the priesthood on 4 September 1927 by Cardinal Jozef-Ernest van Roey, Suenens initially served as a professor at Saint Mary's Institute and then taught moral philosophy and pedagogy at the Minor Seminary of Mechelen from 1930 to 1940. He worked as a chaplain to the 9th artillery regiment of the Belgian Army in Southern France for three months, and in August 1940 he became vice-rector of the famed Catholic University of Louvain. When the Louvain's rector was arrested by Nazi forces in 1943, Suenens took over as acting rector, where he sometimes circumvented and sometimes openly defied the directives of the Nazi occupiers. He was deeply influenced by the Legion of Mary and for many years worked closely with Veronica O'Brien.

=== Episcopal career ===
Ordination history of Leo-Joseph Suenens
History
Priestly ordination
- Date: 4 September 1927
Episcopal consecration
- Consecrated by: Cardinal van Roey
- Date: 16 December 1945
Cardinalate
- Elevated by: Pope John XXIII
- Date: 19 March 1962
Episcopal succession
Bishops consecrated by Leo-Joseph Suenens as principal consecrator
- André Creemers: 1955
- Jules Victor Daem: 1962
- Léonce-Albert Van Peteghem: 1964
- Cardinal Cardijn: 1965
- Gabriel Ukec: 1965
- Jean Jadot: 1968
- Henri Lemaître: 1969
- Jean Huard: 1977
- Cardinal Danneels: 1977

Styles of Leo Jozef Suenens
- Reference style: His Eminence
- Spoken style: Your Eminence
- Informal style: Cardinal
- See: Mechelen-Brussels

On 12 November 1945, he was appointed by Pope Pius XII as Auxiliary Bishop of Mechelen and Titular Bishop of Isinda. Suenens received his episcopal consecration on the following 16 December from Cardinal van Roey, with Bishops Étienne Joseph Carton de Wiart and Jean-Marie Van Cauwenbergh serving as co-consecrators. While an auxiliary bishop he served as National President of the Legion of Mary and Pax Christi, and national liaison for Catholic Action in Belgium.

Suenens was named Archbishop of Mechelen on 24 November 1961; the primatial Belgian see was renamed Mechelen-Brussels on 8 December of the same year. Suenens was created Cardinal Priest of S. Pietro in Vincoli by Pope John XXIII in the consistory of 19 March 1962.

Suenens was one of the cardinal electors who participated in the 1963 papal conclave which selected Pope Paul VI.

He also voted in the conclaves of August and October 1978, and finally resigned from his post in Mechelen-Brussels on 4 October 1979 after seventeen years of service.

=== Second Vatican Council ===
When Pope John XXIII called the world's bishops to Rome for the Second Vatican Council (1962–1965), he found in Suenens a man who shared his views on the need for renewal in the Church. When the first session fell into organizational chaos under the weight of its documents, it was Suenens who, at the invitation of the Pope, rescued it from deadlock and essentially set the agenda for the entire Council.

Paul VI made him one of the four moderators of the council, along with Cardinals Gregorio Pietro Agagianian, Julius Döpfner, and Giacomo Lercaro. Suenens was also believed to be a decisive force behind the Conciliar documents Lumen gentium and Gaudium et spes.

=== Death ===
Suenens died from thrombosis in Brussels at age 91, and was buried at St. Rumbold's Cathedral. At the time of his death he was one of the four living cardinals elevated by Pope John XXIII.

After his death, Belgian police drilled into his tomb and that of Cardinal Jozef-Ernest Van Roey, searching for documents connected to the sex abuse scandal, which had supposedly been buried with the cardinals.

== Views ==
=== Dialogue with the modern world ===
Dialogue with other Christian denominations as well as with other religions, the proper role of the laity, modernization of religious life for women, collegiality, religious liberty, collaboration and corresponsibility in the Church were among the causes he advocated at the council.

Pope John Paul II himself later attested that "Cardinal Suenens had played a decisive part in the Council".

He was described by his successor, Godfried Danneels, as “an excellent weather-forecaster who know from which direction the wind was blowing in the Church, and an experienced strategist who realized that he could not change the wind’s direction but he could set the sails to suit it."

=== Relations with the Curia ===
In May 1969, an interview he gave to the French Catholic magazine Informations Catholiques Internationales in which he offered a critique of the Roman Curia. Eugène Tisserant subsequently demanded a retraction, but Suenens refused and declared that Tisserant's reaction as unacceptable and unfounded. In 1979, Suenens remarked about it, "There are times when loyalty demands more than keeping in step with an old piece of music. As far as I am concerned loyalty is a different kind of love. And this demands that we accept responsibility for the whole and serve the Church with as much courage and candor as possible."

=== Ecumenism ===
Committed to ecumenism, he and Archbishop Michael Ramsey of Canterbury were close friends.

=== Marriage ===
During the council's debates on marriage, Suenens accused the Church of holding procreation above conjugal love; Pope Paul was greatly distressed by this and the Cardinal later denied "that he had questioned the authentic Church teaching on marriage".

=== Humanae Vitae ===
According to Time magazine, Suenens counseled the Pope against the releasing of his Encyclical Letter Humanae Vitae.

=== Orthodoxy and heterodoxy ===
Suenens once remarked, "If you don't believe in the Holy Spirit or Resurrection or life after death, you should leave the Church."

=== Charismatic Renewal ===
He endorsed the Catholic Charismatic Renewal; his episcopal motto was In Spiritu Sancto ("In the Holy Spirit").

== Published works ==
His written works that have appeared in English include:

- Theology of the Apostolate, Mercier Press, Cork, 1953.
- Edel Quinn, Fallon Ltd, Dublin, 1953.
- The Right View of Moral Re-armament, Burns and Oates, London, 1953.
- The Gospel to Every Creature, Burns and Oates, London, 1956.
- Mary Mother of God, Burns and Oates, London, 1957.
- Love and Control, Burns and Oates, London, 1961.
- The Nun in the World, Burns and Oates, London, 1962.
- Christian Life Day by Day, Burns and Oates, London, 1963.
- The Church in Dialogue, Fides Publishers, Notre Dame, Indiana, 1965.
- Co-Responsibility in the Church, Burns and Oates, London, 1968.
- The Future of the Christian Church, with Michael Ramsey, SCM Press, London, 1970.
- A New Pentecost?, Darton, Longman and Todd, London, 1975.
- Your God?, Seabury Press, New York, 1978.
- The Charismatic Renewal, The Word of Life, Notre Dame, Indiana, 1974.
- Ecumenism and Charismatic Renewal, Darton, Longman and Todd, London, 1978.
- Charismatic Renewal and Social Action, with Hélder Câmara, Darton, Longman and Todd, London, 1980.
- Renewal and Powers of Darkness, Darton, Longman and Todd, London, 1983.
- Nature and Grace: A Vital Unity, Darton, Longman and Todd, London, 1983.
- Resting in the Spirit, Veritas, Dublin, 1989.
- Memories and Hopes, Veritas, Dublin, 1992.
- The Hidden Hand of God, Veritas, Dublin 1994.
- The Christian at the Dawn of a New Era, Fiat Publications, Mechelen, 1997.

== Honours and awards ==
In 1976, Suenens received the Templeton Prize for Progress in Religion from Prince Philip at Buckingham Palace.

== See also ==
- Archbishopric of Mechelen-Brussels

Catholic Church titles
Preceded by Jozef-Ernest van Roey	1st Archbishop of Mechelen-Brussels; 1961–1979	Succeeded by Godfried Danneels
Preceded by Teodósio de Gouveia	Cardinal-Priest of the San Pietro in Vincoli; 1962–1996	Succeeded by Jean Marie Balland
