= Episcopal Conference of Belgium =

Assembly of Catholic bishops

Conference logo

The Belgian Bishops' Conference or the Episcopal Conference of Belgium (Dutch: Belgische Bisschoppenconferentie; French: Conférence épiscopale de Belgique; German: Belgische Bischofskonferenz) is the permanent organ of the Roman Catholic bishops in Belgium. It is a member of the Council of European Bishops' Conferences. It includes the bishops, auxiliary bishops and retired bishops of the ecclesiastical province of Belgium.

== Bureau ==
The chairman is the archbishop of Mechelen-Brussels, Luc Terlinden. The Secretary-General is Bruno Spriet.

== Members of the Belgian Bishops' Conference ==
=== Bishops ===
- Luc Terlinden, archbishop of Mechelen-Brussels
- Johan Bonny, bishop of Antwerp
- Lodewijk Aerts, bishop of Bruges
- Jean-Pierre Delville, bishop of Liège
- Frederic Rossignol, bishop of Tournai
- Patrick Hoogmartens, bishop of Hasselt
- Fabien Lejeusne, bishop of Namur

=== Auxiliary bishops ===
- Jean Kockerols, auxiliary bishop of Mechelen-Brussel
- Koenraad Vanhoutte, auxiliary bishop of Mechelen-Brussel

=== Emeriti ===
- André-Joseph Léonard, archbishop emeritus of Mechelen-Brussel
- Jozef De Kesel, archbishop emeritus of Mechelen-Brussel
- Albert Houssiau, bishop emeritus of Liège
- Arthur Luysterman, bishop emeritus of Ghent
- Lucas Van Looy, bishop emeritus of Ghent
- Lode Van Hecke, bishop emeritus of Ghent
- Paul Van den Berghe, bishop emeritus of Antwerp
- Jan De Bie, auxiliary bishop emeritus of Mechelen-Brussel
- Rémy Vancottem, bishop emeritus of Namur
- Jean-Luc Hudsyn, auxiliary bishop emeritus of Mechelen-Brussel
- Pierre Warin, bishop emeritus of Namur
- Guy Harpigny, bishop emeritus of Tournai

== Operation ==
Within the Belgian Bishops' Conference, there are four standing committees and three Episcopal bishops committee. Each of them stands in front of a bishop to be elected as members of two or three bishops, as other members of the clergy and experts can be included. Furthermore, the bishops' conference has a coordination committee. In his work on the commissions and committees are prepared to be further discussed and inter-diocesan projects. This committee is chaired by the chairman of the Bishops' Conference.

== Commissions and committees ==
- Commission on Faith and Church
- Commission on Evangelism
- Commission for the Diocese
- Commission "Gaudium et Spes"
- Committee for Media
- Committee for administrative, legal and financial issues
- Committee for Contacts with the public institutions and local governments
