= Jozef De Kesel =

Belgian Roman Catholic bishop

His Eminence Jozef De Kesel
- Cardinal, Archbishop Emeritus of Mechelen-Brussels
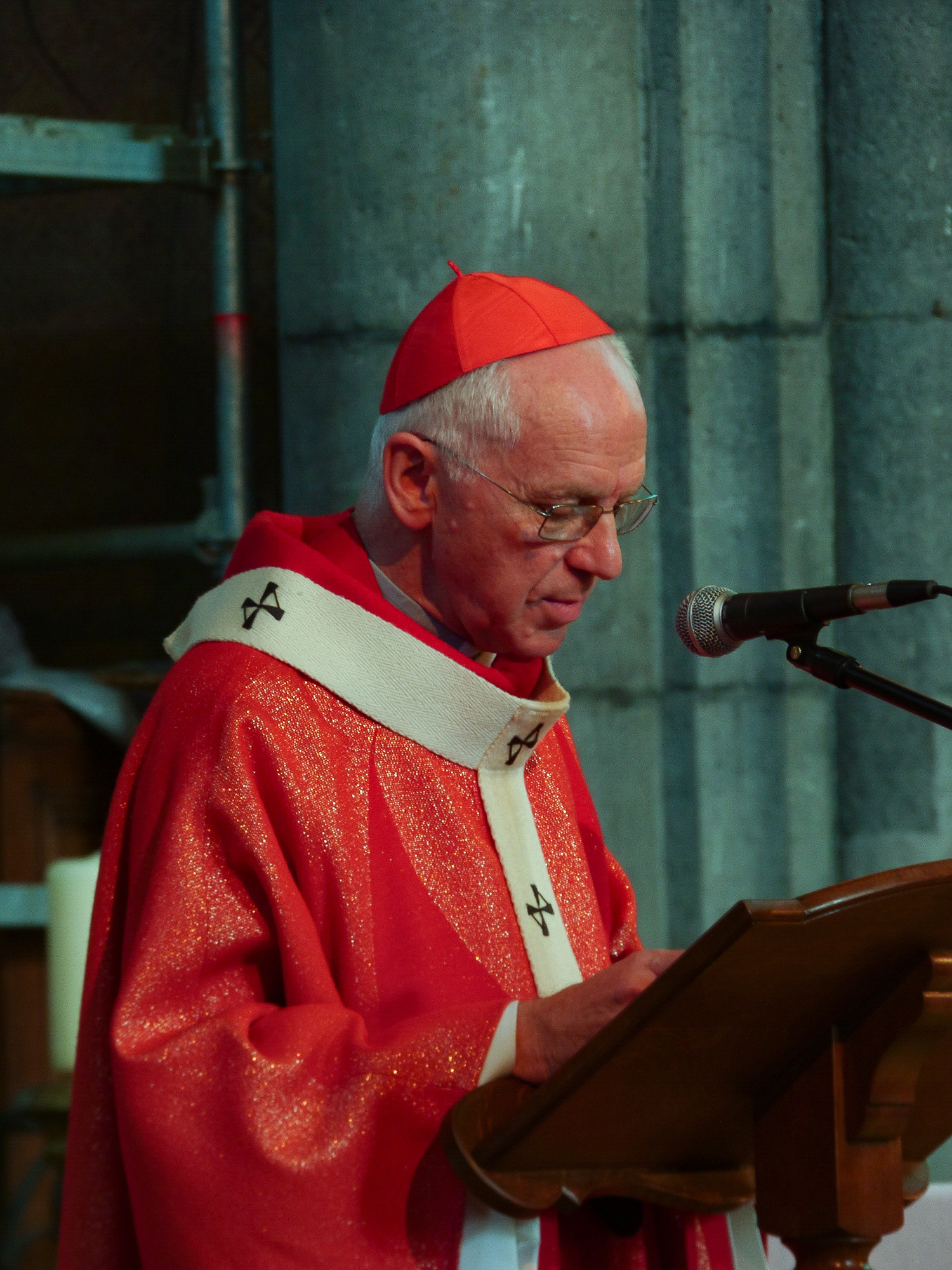
- Church: Roman Catholic Church
- Archdiocese: Mechelen-Brussels
- Appointed: 6 November 2015
- Installed: 12 December 2015
- Term ended: 22 June 2023
- Predecessor: André-Joseph Léonard
- Successor: Luc Terlinden
- Other post: Cardinal-Priest of Ss. Giovanni e Paolo
- Previous post: Bishop of Bruges (2010–2015)

Orders
- Ordination: 26 August 1972 by Leo-Karel De Kesel
- Consecration: 26 May 2002 by Godfried Danneels
- Created cardinal: 19 November 2016 by Pope Francis
- Rank: Cardinal Priest

Personal details
- Born: 17 June 1947 (age 79) Ghent, Belgium
- Education: Catholic University of Leuven; Pontifical Gregorian University
- Motto: Vobiscum Christianus (With you, I am a Christian)
- Coat of arms: Jozef De Kesel's coat of arms

Styles of Jozef De Kesel
- Reference style: His Eminence
- Spoken style: Your Eminence
- Religious style: Cardinal
- Informal style: Cardinal

Ordination history of Jozef De Kesel
History
Episcopal consecration
- Principal consecrator: Godfried Daneels
- Co-consecrators: Arthur Luysterman; Rémy Victor Vancotten
Cardinalate
- Elevated by: Pope Francis
Episcopal succession
Bishops consecrated by Jozef De Kesel as principal consecrator
- Lode Aerts: 4 December 2016
- Koenraad Vanhoutte: 18 May 2018
- Lode Van Hecke: 23 February 2020
- Luc Terlinden: 3 September 2023

Jozef De Kesel (born 17 June 1947) is a Belgian Catholic prelate who served as Archbishop of Mechelen-Brussels from 2015 to 2023. He previously served there as auxiliary bishop from 2002 to 2010. He served as Bishop of Bruges from 2010 to 2015 and was made a cardinal in 2016.

== Early life ==
De Kesel was born on 17 June 1947 in Ghent, the sixth of eleven children. He entered the seminary in 1965, studied philosophy and theology at the seminary of Saint-Paul in Ghent and received his degree in Philosophy and Letters at the Catholic University of Leuven. From 1968 until 1972 he studied theology in Rome at the Pontifical Gregorian University, he gained first his license and then in 1977 his doctorate.

He was ordained a priest for the Diocese of Ghent on 26 August 1972 by his uncle Leo-Karel De Kesel, an auxiliary bishop of Ghent. While in Ghent he taught religious education at the diocesan secondary school in Eeklo from 1974 to 1980 and led courses in religion, philosophical anthropology and contemporary thought at Artevelde University of Applied Sciences (Sociale Hogeschool Gent) from 1977 to 1980. He was professor of fundamental theology and dogmatic theology at the Major Seminary of Ghent from 1980 to 1996 and at the same time, Professor of Theology at the Higher Institute of Religious Sciences in Ghent, where he was also dean. He was professor of Christology at the Catholic University of Leuven from 1989 to 1992. He also had responsibility for the formation of pastoral workers in Ghent from 1983 to 2002 and was episcopal vicar for theological and pastoral training in the diocese of Ghent from 1992 to 2002.

== Bishop ==
Pope John Paul II appointed him titular bishop of Bulna and auxiliary of Mechelen-Brussel on 20 March 2002. As his episcopal motto he chose the words of St. Augustine "Like you I am a Christian". He later explained he dropped the preceding words ("I am a bishop for you") to underscore his "first vocation" as a follower of Christ. He was consecrated on 26 May and appointed Vicar General for the vicariate of Brussels. While serving as auxiliary, in the Belgian bishops' conference he was responsible for the inter-diocesan Commission for Pastoral Liturgy (Flemish and French) and a delegate to the Commission of the Bishops' Conferences of the European Community (COMECE).

When Cardinal Godfried Danneels, Archbishop of Mechelen-Brussels, reached retirement age in 2008, the Nuncio to Belgium, Archbishop Karl-Josef Rauber, recommended De Kesel to succeed him, a candidacy supported by Danneels as well. Pope Benedict XVI ignored Rauber's recommendation and De Kesel remained an auxiliary. The affair was recalled in later years as Pope Francis took a different stance, making Rauber a cardinal, moving De Kesel to Mechelen-Brussels, and then making De Kesel a cardinal as well.

On 25 June 2010, De Kesel was appointed bishop of Bruges after the early resignation of Roger Vangheluwe and installed there on 10 July 2010.

In September 2010 De Kesel said: "I think the Church must ask itself the question of whether it is appropriate to keep the mandatory character of celibacy. We could say that there are celibate priests, but that people for whom celibacy is humanly impossible should also have the chance of becoming priests."

== Archbishop ==
On 6 November 2015 Pope Francis named De Kesel to succeed André-Joseph Léonard as Archbishop of Mechelen-Brussels and Primate of Belgium. He was installed at a Mass attended by Belgium's King Philippe on 12 December 2015. Christopher Lamb calls him "a moderate in comparison with his conservative predecessor". He noted that the Bishop of Antwerp, Johan Bonny, had called for the recognition of same-sex relationships, while De Kesel by contrast said that universal respect, no matter one's sexual orientation, "is a value that the Gospel shares with modern culture." In an interview upon his appointment, De Kesel said he was inspired in his vocation by the theologians Romano Guardini, Charles de Foucauld, Edward Schillebeeckx, Karl Rahner and Willem Barnard, and later Dietrich Bonhoeffer. He said he hoped the Church would accept that it is shrinking even as it "radiates conviction" and addresses social ills. He was disappointed the recent Synod on the Family had not resulted in allowing remarried Catholics to receive Communion, but thought the assembly demonstrated that the Church has a new mentality, adding: "For me, mercy is an important word, but somehow it still has something condescending about it. I like to take a word like respect and reverence for man as my starting point. And that is perhaps a value that we as Christians have in common with the prevailing culture."

De Kesel was elected president of the Belgian Episcopal Conference on 26 January 2016 and served until he retired as archbishop of Mechelen-Brussels in 2023.

Pope Francis made De Kesel a cardinal in the consistory of 19 November 2016.

On 23 December 2017 Pope Francis appointed De Kesel a member of the Dicastery for the Laity, Family and Life. He was named a member of the Pontifical Council for Culture on 11 November 2019.

He has advocated allowing 10-year-olds to both receive their First Communion and be confirmed.

He was treated for cancer in 2020-21.

In 2022, together with other bishops of Flanders, he published a formula for the blessing of same-sex couples, underlining that it is not to be understood as recognizing a different form of marriage. However its clearly at odds with the official Catholic stance that calls people with same-sex attraction to chastity, since it states that these unions "can also be a source of peace and shared happiness for those involved.”

Pope Francis accepted his resignation on 22 June 2023.

He was one of the cardinal electors in the 2025 papal conclave that elected Robert Prevost as Pope Leo XIV.

Catholic Church titles
Preceded by Jan De Bie	Auxiliary Bishop of Mechelen-Brussels; 20 March 2002 – 25 June 2010	Succeeded by Léon Lemmens
Preceded by Joseph Werth	— TITULAR — Titular Bishop of Bulna; 20 March 2002 – 25 June 2010	Succeeded by Jan Sobiło
Preceded by Roger Vangheluwe	Bishop of Bruges; 25 June 2010 – 6 November 2015	Succeeded by Lode Aerts
Preceded by André-Joseph Léonard	Archbishop of Mechelen-Brussels; 6 November 2015 – 22 June 2023	Succeeded by Luc Terlinden
Preceded by André-Joseph Léonard	Military Ordinary of Belgium; 6 November 2015 – 22 June 2023	Succeeded by Luc Terlinden
Preceded by André-Joseph Léonard	President of the Belgian Episcopal Conference; 26 January 2016 – 22 June 2023	Succeeded by Luc Terlinden
Preceded by Edward Egan	Cardinal-Priest of Santi Giovanni e Paolo; 19 November 2016 –	Incumbent
