= Léonce-Albert Van Peteghem =

Belgian Roman Catholic Bishop (1916–2004)

His Excellency Léonce-Albert Van Peteghem
- Episc. Gandavense
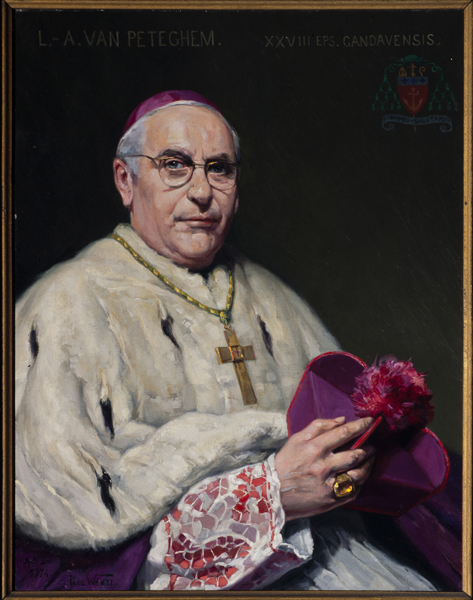
- Diocese: Ghent
- See: St Bavo's
- In office: 1964–1991
- Successor: Arthur Luysterman

Orders
- Consecration: 29 June 1964 by Cardinal Suenens

Personal details
- Born: 7 October 1916 near Ghent, Belgium
- Died: 7 January 2004 (aged 87) Ghent, Belgium
- Buried: Ghent
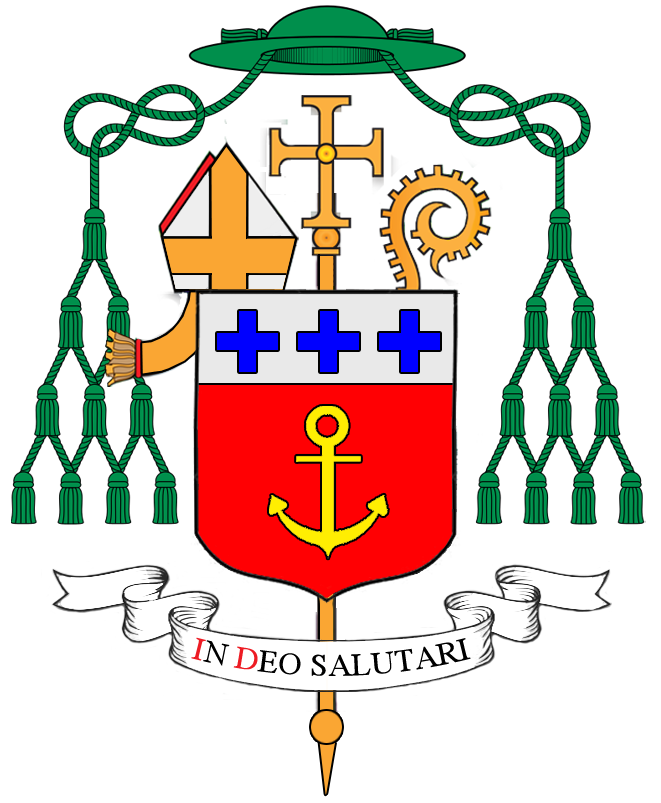
- Coat of arms

Léonce-Albert Van Peteghem (7 October 1916 – 7 January 2004) was the twenty-eighth Bishop of Ghent, Belgium, from 1964 to 1991, an unusually long incumbency.

== Life ==
=== Early years ===
Van Peteghem was born a short distance to the north of Ghent, the youngest of his parents' twelve children. His parents were farm workers. He spent some of his childhood in nearby Lochristi after his parents relocated to obtain work, and more of it in De Pinte (still in East Flanders) for the same reason. He received a Classics and Humanities focused education at Sint-Lievenscollege in Ghent, before undertaking higher level studies at the Seminary in Ghent and at the Catholic (Dutch language) University of Leuven.

He was ordained to the priesthood on 18 August 1940 and graduated Licentiate of Sacred Theology from the Catholic University of Leuven in 1943. On 11 September 1943 he was appointed to a professorship in Fundamental Moral Theology at the Major Seminary of Ghent, where he was also appointed Spiritual Director in 1956.

Under the German occupation of Belgium during World War II, from 1943 to 1945, he was also employed as sub-regent at Pope's College, Leuven. On 31 January 1956 he became a canon of the chapter of St Bavo's Cathedral, Ghent. On 22 January 1960 he became an ecclesiastical judge in the Diocese of Ghent, and Bishop Karel Justinus Calewaert appointed him diocesan Vicar general a year later.

=== The bishop ===
Pope Paul VI appointed Van Peteghem Bishop of Ghent on 28 May 1964, at the relatively young age of 47. He was consecrated in Ghent Cathedral by Cardinal Suenens on 29 June 1964. Van Peteghem took as his episcopal motto In Deo salutari ("In God the saviour"). The three crosses on the episcopal arms he chose recalled, in part, the village of his birth.

He participated for nearly two years in the work of the Second Vatican Council which had started its deliberations in October 1962. He would later come to be seen as unsympathetic to some of The Council's more "liberal" outcomes.

On 1 October 1967 he became an honorary canon of the Chapter of St Bavo's in Ghent's sister bishopric, Haarlem. Ten years later, in 1977, he issued his own catechism supporting religious education in his diocese.

=== Retirement ===
On 13 July 1990 Arthur Luysterman was appointed as Van Peteghem's Coadjutor bishop.

7 October 1991 was Van Peteghem's seventy-fifth birthday. He was the first bishop of Ghent to be affected by the requirements of the 1966 apostolic letter Ecclesiae Sanctae, in which Pope Paul VI had mandated 75 as a retirement age for bishops. Van Peteghem therefore submitted his resignation on his birthday, and after slightly more than two months, Pope John Paul II accepted it on 27 December 1991.

=== Death and celebration ===
Léonce-Albert Van Peteghem died on 7 January 2004 in Ghent. His funeral took place at St Bavo's on 17 January 2004 in the presence of Cardinal Archbishop Godfried Danneels and the city's Socialist mayor, Frank Beke. The service was conducted by Van Peteghem's successor, Arthur Luysterman, and afterwards his mortal remains were buried in the crypt.

== Evaluation ==
Paying tribute to his predecessor, Bishop Luysterman highlighted Van Peteghem's simplicity, warmth and striking honesty. Van Peteghem was steadfast in his loyalty to the church and its teachings through the 1960s, a decade of spiritual turbulence and uncertainty. He was a strong advocate of priests being recognisably and correctly dressed, according to their positions within the church, and he opposed the reconfiguring of church pews in ways that made it impossible to kneel for prayer.
