= Luc Alfons de Hovre =

Luc Alfons de Hovre, S.J., was an auxiliary bishop of Mechelen-Brussels and titular Bishop of Domnach Sechnaill.

Born on 27 February 1926 in Nederbrakel, he was ordained a Jesuit priest on 10 May 1958 at the age of 32. On 15 February 1982, aged 56, he was appointed as auxiliary bishop for Mechelen-Brussels as well as titular Bishop of Domnach Sechnaill. The following month he was consecrated. His principal consecrator was Cardinal Godfried Danneels as well as Bishops Philip Ekka, Paul Constant Schoenmaekers, Leo-Karel Jozef De Kesel and Jean-Baptiste Musty.

He retired on 20 March 2002, aged 76. He died on 4 June 2009, aged 83, from undisclosed causes. He had been a priest for 51 years and a bishop for 27 years.
