= Roger Vangheluwe =

Belgian Catholic prelate (1936–2026)

- Bishop (Note: Vangheluwe was bishop emeritus of Bruges from when he retired in 2010 until he was laicized in 2024.) of Bruges
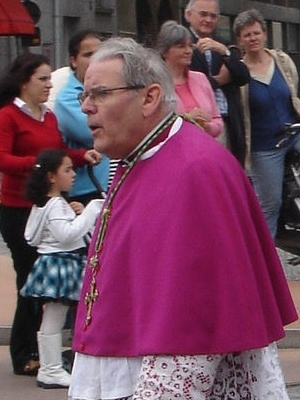
- Vangheluwe in 2007
- Church: Catholic Church
- Diocese: Bruges
- Installed: 3 February 1985
- Retired: 23 April 2010
- Predecessor: Emiel-Jozef De Smedt
- Successor: Jozef De Kesel

Orders
- Ordination: 1 February 1963
- Consecration: 3 February 1985 by Godfried Danneels, Emiel-Jozef De Smedt, Eugeen Laridon, Jean Huard and Rémy Vancottem
- Laicized: 20 March 2024 by Pope Francis

Personal details
- Born: Roger Joseph Vangheluwe; 7 November 1936 Roeselare, Belgium
- Died: 1 July 2026 (aged 89) Solesmes, Sarthe, France
- Education: KU Leuven

Roger Joseph Vangheluwe (7 November 1936 – 1 July 2026) was a Belgian prelate of the Catholic Church. He was Bishop of Bruges from 1985 to 2010, when he resigned after admitting that as a priest and bishop he had sexual relations over 15 years with his nephew, who was a minor when it began. He later described similar behavior with a second nephew, also a minor, over the course of a year. Pope Francis laicized him in March 2024. Belgium's statute of limitations prevented him from being prosecuted.

== Early life and career ==
Roger Vangheluwe was born on 7 November 1936 in Roeselare, the youngest of four children in a family of modest means. He attended the less prestigious local Catholic school instead of the minor seminary attended by his middle-class peers.

He earned a licentiate in theology and biblical languages and a diploma in mathematics at KU Leuven. He was ordained a priest on 1 February 1963 and then fulfilled assignments in education and parish ministry. From 1968 to 1984 he was professor at the Major Seminary in Bruges. He was also vicar for the central district of the diocese beginning in 1969 and was secretary of that vicariate from 1977 to 1984.

Vangheluwe was appointed Bishop of Bruges on 15 December 1984 by Pope John Paul II. He received his episcopal consecration in Bruges on 3 February 1985 from Cardinal Godfried Danneels. He represented the Episcopal Conference of Belgium at KU Leuven and chaired its committee on the diaconate. He had a reputation as a popular and friendly bishop, "not a church servant in an ivory tower, but a true friend of the people". He advocated for a greater role for women in the church but was traditional on questions of divorce and homosexuality. His 25th anniversary in Bruges was marked with a large celebration in February 2010.

When asked during a university lecture on 19 April 2010 how pedophilia should best be discussed in class, Vangheluwe replied: "I think you need to be well informed about these things. In a way, it's not a tougher subject than many others. Yes, it's embarrassing, it's scandalous. But then again, so are many other things. ... Also, there have been some articles that imply that pedophilia is nowhere so little prevalent as in the Church." Two days later, on 21 April 2010, the Catholic periodical Kerk en Leven (Church and Life) published the following quotation taken from his answer: "At present we suffer from the scandals that batter the Church: everywhere there are stories of priests abusing children. It's horrible to see these things surface, and they hurt us deeply. Nevertheless, this shouldn't blind us from the fact that the majority of priests lead exemplary lives and represent a support to many. ... They aspire to imitate Jesus."

== Resignation ==
On 23 April 2010, Pope Benedict XVI accepted Vangheluwe's resignation after his admission that he had repeatedly sexually abused his nephew for 13 years, starting when the boy was five years old. The abuse began when Vangheluwe was a priest and continued after he became a bishop. His was the first episcopal resignation in Belgium relating to the sexual abuse of minors. At the time Vangheluwe was Belgium's longest serving bishop, a year shy of the standard retirement age of 75.

Vangheluwe's resignation was announced at a press conference by Archbishop André-Joseph Léonard. Leonard said that Vangheluwe's resignation shows that the Catholic Church in Belgium wants to "turn over a leaf from a not very distant past".

=== Retirement ===
On 26 April 2010, it was reported that Vangheluwe had retired to Westvleteren Abbey with a state pension of about US$3,600 a month. In September 2010, Vangheluwe announced he was leaving the abbey and that "as of today, I will contemplate my life and future somewhere hidden, outside the bishopric of Bruges". He was reported to be living in an abbey in the Loire Valley in France.

On 4 April 2011, the Reuters news service reported that Belgian authorities were not considering prosecuting Vangheluwe because his crimes occurred too long ago.

On 12 April 2011, the Holy See Press Office announced that the Congregation for the Doctrine of the Faith had ruled that Vangheluwe must leave Belgium and undergo spiritual and psychological treatment. Its statement said that "he is not allowed any public exercise of priestly or episcopal ministry. The psychological treatment is provided by the Congregation to obtain additional information useful for diagnosis and prognosis, to come to a final decision, which remains the responsibility of the congregation itself, and to be approved by the Holy Father. This decision will of course take into account the different aspects of the issue, beginning with the suffering of the victims and the needs of justice. The process is still ongoing and therefore the decision taken so far by the Congregation is provisional and not final."

On 14 April 2011, Vangheluwe gave an interview to Flemish TV station VT4. In the interview, he admitted to abusing another nephew. He also stated that he did not see himself as a pedophile. The interview caused indignation in Belgium. On 24 April 2011, Archbishop André-Joseph Léonard strongly condemned the interview, noting that the Vatican had insisted that Vangheluwe remain silent. He called the interview "shocking".

=== Laicization ===
In a decision made known to Vangheluwe on 20 March 2024, Pope Francis laicized Vangheluwe, as Belgium's bishops had long advocated, on the recommendation of the Dicastery for the Doctrine of the Faith, which had conducted a re-examination of his case, which included hearing testimony from Vangheluwe, following new charges brought against him. The announcement made by the Apostolic Nunciature to Belgium said that the former bishop "asked to be able to reside in a place of retreat, without any contact with the outside world".

== Death ==
Vangheluwe died on 1 July 2026, at the age of 89, and was buried after a private funeral.

== Notes ==
Religious titles
Preceded by Emiel-Jozef De Smedt	Bishop of Bruges; 3 February 1985 – 22 April 2010	Succeeded by Jozef De Kesel
