= Luc Terlinden =

Belgian Catholic bishop

The Most Reverend Luc Terlinden
- Archbishop of Mechelen-Brussels
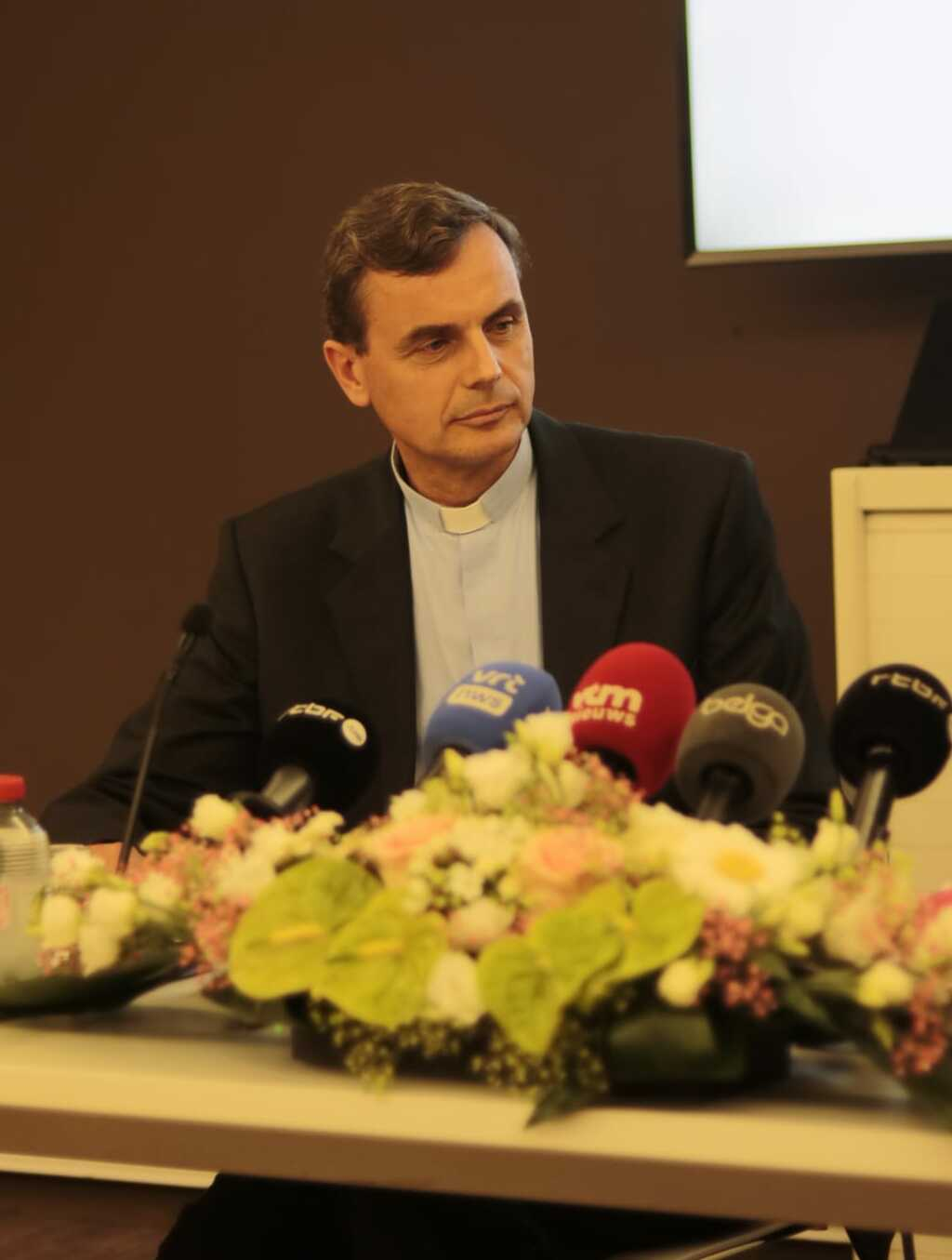
- Terlinden in 2023
- Church: Roman Catholic Church
- Archdiocese: Mechelen-Brussels
- See: Mechelen-Brussels
- Appointed: 22 June 2023
- Installed: 3 September 2023
- Predecessor: Jozef De Kesel
- Other post: Military Ordinary of Belgium (2023–)
- Previous post: Vicar-General of Mechelen-Brussels (2021–23)

Orders
- Ordination: 18 September 1999 by Godfried Danneels
- Consecration: 3 September 2023 by Jozef De Kesel

Personal details
- Born: Luc Christian Joseph Marie Terlinden; 17 October 1968 (age 57) Etterbeek, Belgium
- Parents: Maximilien Terlinden; Geneviève van der Rest
- Education: Catholic University of Louvain; Katholieke Universiteit Leuven; Alphonsian Academy
- Motto: Fratelli tutti ("All Brothers")
- Coat of arms

Luc Christian Joseph Marie Terlinden is a Belgian Catholic prelate who has served as Archbishop of Mechelen-Brussels, Primate of Belgium and head of the Military Ordinariate of Belgium since September 2023. He is president of the Episcopal Conference of Belgium and the second-youngest Primate of Belgium.

== Biography ==
Luc Terlinden was born in Etterbeek on 17 October 1968. He is the youngest of seven children born to Colonel Baron Maximilien Terlinden (1927–2016) and Geneviève van der Rest (1935–2002).

He attended the Institut Saint-Stanislas in Brussels from 1980 to 1986. He began his university work in commercial and management engineering at the Catholic University of Louvain and earned a degree in economics at the Katholieke Universiteit Leuven in 1991, having chosen the latter to perfect his Dutch.

Terlinden completed his military service in Siegen, Germany, as a reserve officer in the 1st Guide Regiment. While in the military, he joined in a pilgrimage to Lourdes. After a brief stint as a teacher, he entered the diocesan seminary. He was ordained a deacon on 16 October 1998 and a priest on 18 September 1999, both by Cardinal Godfried Danneels for the Archdiocese of Mechelen–Brussels. He has described having a profound spiritual experience at World Youth Day in Rome in 2000.

Terlinden then earned a licentiate in moral theology in 2001 at the Alphonsian Academy in Rome and a doctorate in moral theology in 2005. He wrote his doctoral thesis on the internalization of moral sources according to the writings of Charles Taylor and John Henry Newman.

In 2003, Terlinden was appointed vicar for the parish of Saint-François in Louvain-la-Neuve and in 2010 parish priest of the Sainte-Croix pastoral unit in Ixelles. He also founded Pôles Jeunes for young people in Brussels between 18 and 30 years old. From 2005 to 2014 he also had responsibility for the diocesan vocational service. In 2017, he became president of the seminary for the French-speaking dioceses of Belgium, member of the diocesan council for the Archdiocese of Mechelen-Brussels and a canon of the chapter of Saint-Rombaux. He also became a professor at the major seminary of Namur.

In September 2021, Terlinden was appointed vicar general for the Archdiocese of Mechelen-Brussels. He was a member of the Charles de Foucauld fraternity for priests and spiritual advisor of a Équipe Notre-Dame, a spirituality movement for married couples. He was chaplain of the Saint-André scout unit de Coninck.

On 22 June 2023, Pope Francis named Terlinden to succeed Cardinal Jozef De Kesel as Archbishop of Mechelen-Brussels. Terlinden's name had been the one most often mentioned as De Kesel's successor. His appointment follows the tradition of alternating between a native speaker of French and of Dutch when filling this position, though most likely candidates in the modern era are bilingual. He was the first in a century to be named to the position without already being a bishop . On 28 June he was named head of the Military Ordinariate of Belgium. He chose as his episcopal motto "Tous frères", based on the title of Pope Francis's encyclical Fratelli tutti. In anticipation of his installation in September, he received the pallium, the symbol of his office as a metropolitan, from Pope Francis on 29 June. He is ex officio chancellor of his alma maters, Leuven and Louvain.

He received his episcopal consecration on 3 September 2023 in the Cathedral of Saint Rumbold in Mechelen from De Kesel, his predecessor, with Bishops Johan Bonny of Antwerp and François Touvet of Châlons (France) serving as co-consecrators. King Philippe and Queen Mathilde attended the ceremony. At the age of 54, he was the second youngest prelate to assume the title of Primate of Belgium, after Godfried Danneels, who was 46.

On 12 October 2023, he was elected president of the Conference of Belgian Bishops.

== Personal life ==
Terlinden has been a lifelong enthusiast of the scouting movement, beginning as a member in his youth. He enjoys cycling and mountaineering.

== See also ==
- Catholic Church in Belgium
