= Leon Lemmens =

Belgian Roman Catholic auxiliary bishop

His Excellency Leon Lemmens
- Auxiliary Bishop of Flemish Brabant and Mechelen
- Province: Belgium
- Diocese: Archdiocese of Mechelen-Brussels
- Installed: 3 April 2011
- Predecessor: Jozef De Kesel

Orders
- Ordination: 10 July 1977
- Consecration: 3 April 2011

Personal details
- Born: 16 March 1954 Boorsem
- Died: 2 June 2017 (aged 63) Leuven, Belgium
- Denomination: Roman Catholic
- Residence: Mechelen
- Education: KU Leuven, Pontifical Gregorian University
- Motto: Populum humilem et pauperem (A humble and poor people)
- Coat of arms

Leon Lemmens (16 March 1954 – 2 June 2017) was a Roman Catholic auxiliary bishop in Belgium.

Lemmens, a native of Maasmechelen, was ordained a priest on 10 July 1977. He was named an auxiliary bishop to the Archdiocese of Mechelen-Brussels by Pope Benedict XVI on 22 February 2011 and consecrated on 3 April 2011.

== Biography ==
Lemmens followed high school at the Klein Seminarie in Sint-Truiden. He entered seminary in Sint-Truiden (1971-1976) and was ordained to the priesthood to the Diocese of Hasselt on 10 July 1977. He obtained a bachelor in theology at the KU Leuven (1976) and studies moral theology in Rome. He obtained a licentiate in moral theology (1979) and became doctor in theology in 1989.

He worked as a parish priest in Genk (1981-1984). In 1984 he became professor at the seminary in Hasselt. From 1986 to 1997 he was a member of the Interdiocesan Commission on Liturgy and from 1990 to 1995 he was responsible for vocations. In 1994-1995 he took charge of the organisation of the meeting of young people with the pope in Brussels.

In 2004 he became rector of the Romanian College in Rome and in 2005 he was an official at the Sacred Congregation for the Oriental Churches of the Roman Curia.

=== Auxiliary bishop ===
On 22 February 2011, pope Benedict XVI appointed Lemmens as auxiliary bishop in the archdiocese of Mechelen-Brussels, with the responsibility for the vicariate Vlaams-Brabant & Mechelen. He was a Municipa.

He was consecrated on 3 April 2011 in the National Basilica of the Sacred Heart in Koekelberg by archbishop André-Joseph Léonard.

=== Death ===
Lemmens was a member of the Community of Sant'Egidio from 1977 until his death. He died from leukemia on 2 June 2017 in Leuven, Belgium. His funeral service on 10 June was held in St. Rumbold's Cathedral, Mechelen, which was filled to capacity.
