= Military Ordinariate of Belgium =

Catholic ecclesiastical jurisdiction

Coordinates: 50°54′27″N 4°23′35″E

Military Ordinariate of Belgium Dutch: Bisdom bij de Krijgsmacht French: Diocèse aux Forces armées belges

Catholic
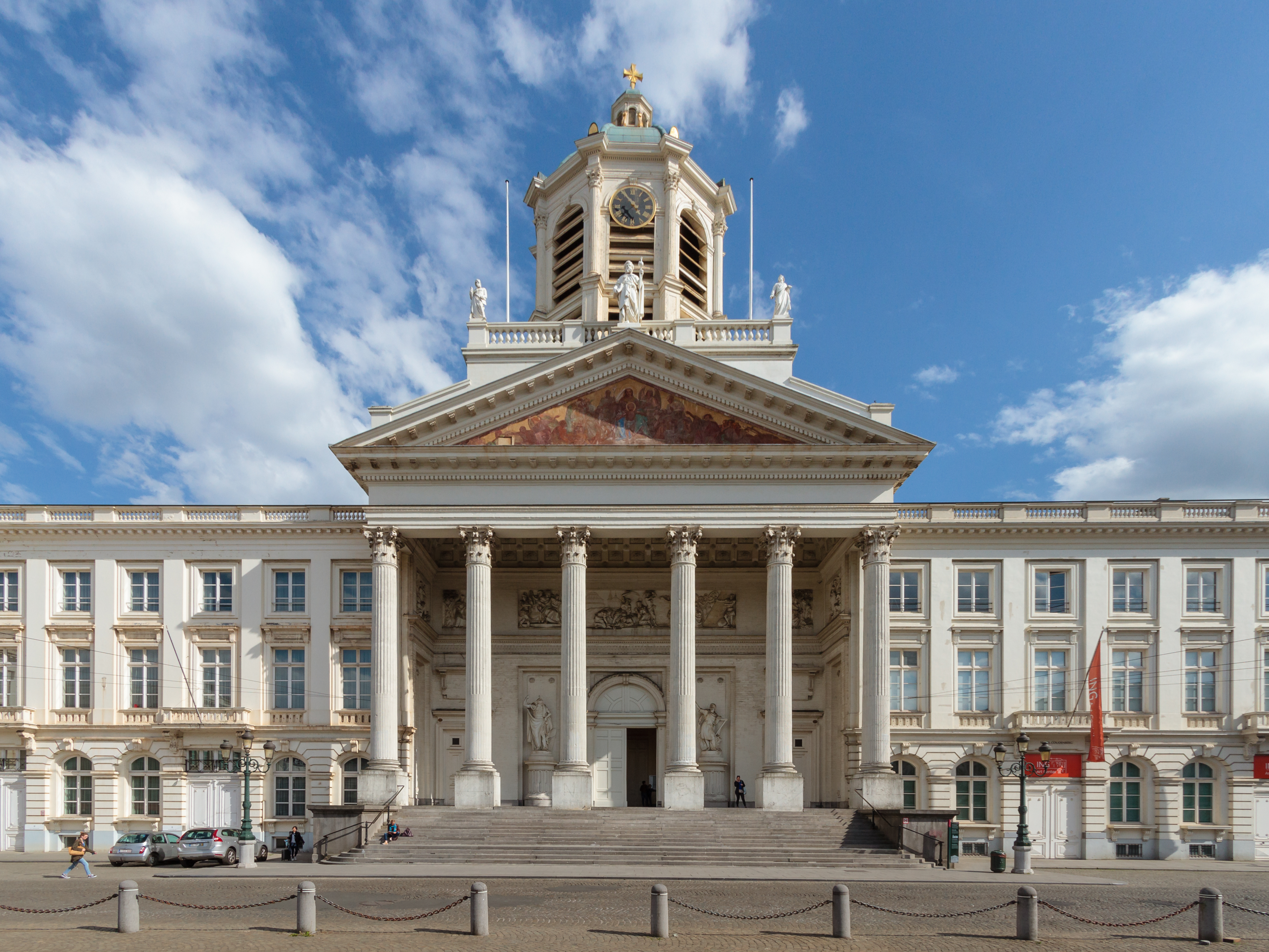
- Church of St. James on Coudenberg

Location
- Country: Belgium
- Ecclesiastical province: Immediately exempt to the Holy See

Statistics
- Parishes: 1
- Churches: 1

Information
- Denomination: Catholic Church
- Sui iuris church: Latin Church
- Rite: Roman Rite
- Established: 7 September 1957 (69 years ago)
- Cathedral: Church of St. James on Coudenberg
- Secular priests: 11

Current leadership
- Pope: Leo XIV
- Archbishop: Luc Terlinden

Website
- Diocèse aux forces armées

The Military Ordinariate of Belgium (Dutch: Bisdom bij de Krijgsmacht, French: Diocèse aux Forces armées belges) is a Latin Church military ordinariate of the Catholic Church in Belgium. Immediately exempt to the Holy See, it provides pastoral care to Catholics serving in the Belgian Armed Forces and their families.

== History ==
The Military Ordinariate of Belgium was established as a military vicariate on 7 September 1957, and elevated to a military ordinariate on 21 July 1986. The Military Ordinary's seat is located at the Church of St. James on Coudenberg in Brussels. The post of Military Ordinary is vested in the Archbishop of Mechelen–Brussels and Primate of Belgium.

== Office holders ==
Flag of the Armed Forces Bishop of Belgium

=== Military vicars ===
- Jozef-Ernest van Roey (appointed 1957 – died 6 August 1961)
- Leo Jozef Suenens (appointed 24 November 1961 – retired 1979)
- Godfried Danneels (appointed 15 September 1980 – became military ordinary 21 July 1986)

=== Military ordinaries ===
- Godfried Danneels (21 July 1986 – 27 February 2010)
- André-Joseph Léonard (27 February 2010 – 6 November 2015)
- Josef De Kesel (6 November 2015 – 28 June 2023)
- Luc Terlinden (28 June 2023 – present)
