= List of schools in Ghent =

Ghent’s list of schools is not comprehensive.

- De Letterdoos
- Atheneum Wispelberg
- Basisschool De Mozaiek
- Basisschool Frans van Ryhove
- Basisschool Het Klaverblad
- Bibliotheekschool
- Bollekensschool
- BSGO Oefenschool Gent
- BuSO Sint-Gerardus
- CBE
- Crombeeninstituut
- De Harp
- De Kolibrie
- De La Sallecollege Gent-Centrum
- De Loods
- De Panda
- De Vlieger
- De Wijze Boom Sint-Amandsberg
- De Wingerd
- EDUGO Scholengemeenschap
- Gaspard de Colignyschool
- Handelsschool Coupure
- Het Trappenhuis
- Hogeschool Gent
- Industrieel Ingenieur BME-CTL
- Instituut Bert Carlier
- Instituut van Gent
- International School Ghent
- Katholieke Hogeschool voor Lerarenopleiding en Bedrijfsmanagement
- Koninklijk Atheneum Gent
- Kunstsecundair Instituut Sint-Lucas Gent
- Methodeschool De Appelaar
- MSGO III Gent
- Nieuwen Bosch
- Nieuwen Bosch Basisschool
- Onze Lieve Vrouw Instituut
- Provinciaal Centrum voor Volwassenenonderwijs
- Provinicaal Instituut voor Haartooi en Schoonheidszorgen; school for hairdressers and beauticians
- S.S.B.O. Reynaertschool
- Scholengemeenschap Gent-Zuid
- Secundair Kunstinstituut
- Sint Pietersinstituut
- Sint-Barbaracollege
- Sint-Bavohumaniora
- Sint-Janscollege
- Sint-Lievenscollege
- Sint-Lievenscollege Basisschool
- Sint-Lievenscollege Sint-Pieters-Buiten
- Sint-Paulusinstituut
- T.I. Tweebruggen
- Toren van Babel
- Universiteit Gent
- UZ-school stad Gent
- Vrije Gesubsidieerde Basisschool
