= Catholic Church in Belgium =

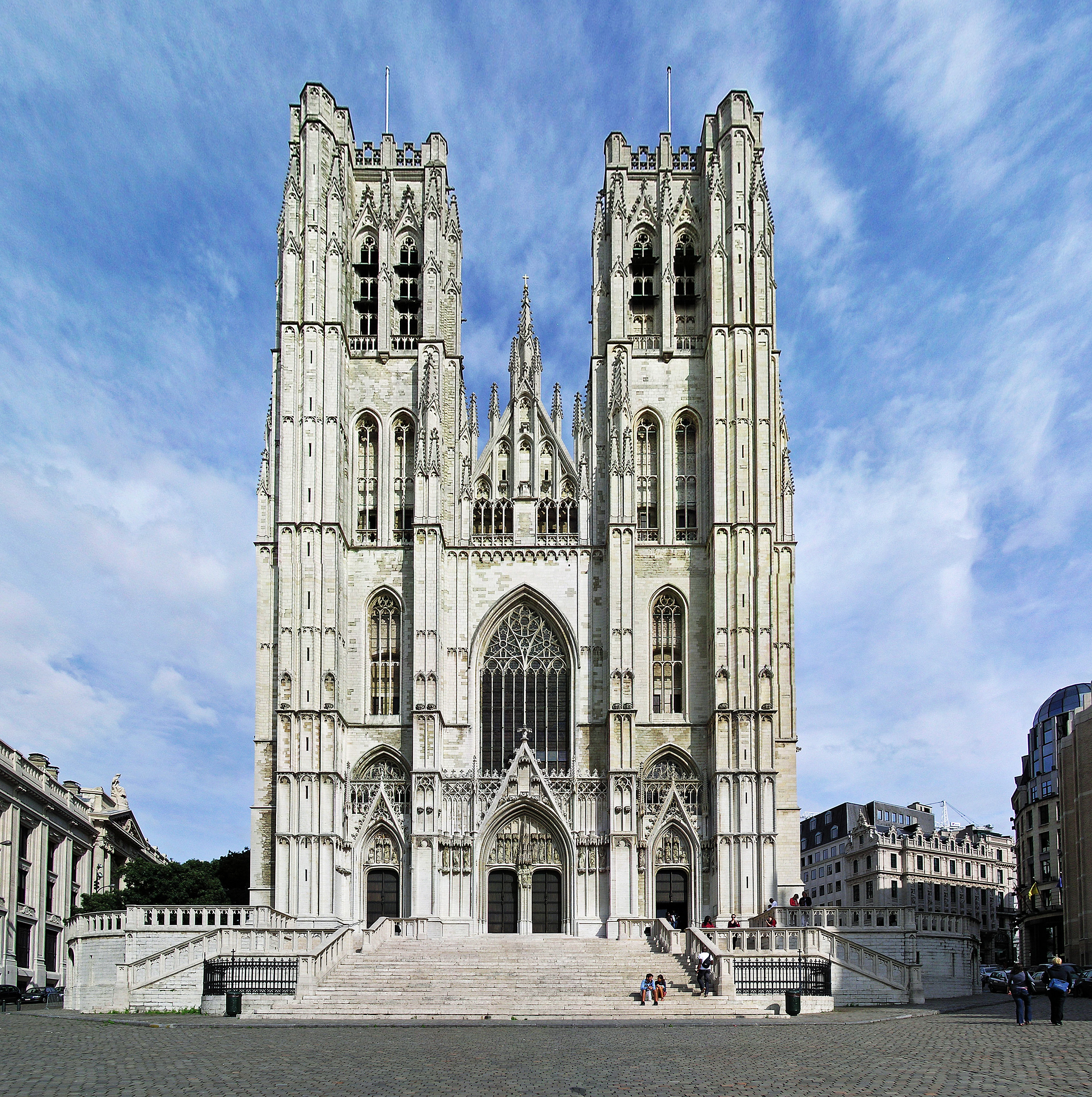
Cathedral of St. Michael and St. Gudula in Brussels

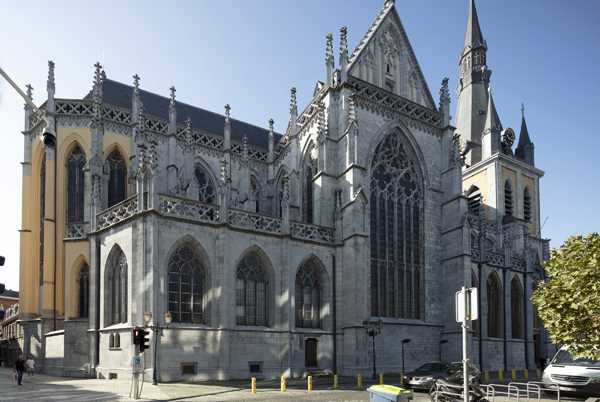
St. Paul's Cathedral in Liège

The Belgian Catholic Church, also known as the Catholic Church in Belgium, is part of the global Catholic Church and is under the spiritual leadership of the Pope, the curia in Rome and the Episcopal Conference of Bishops.

== Dioceses ==
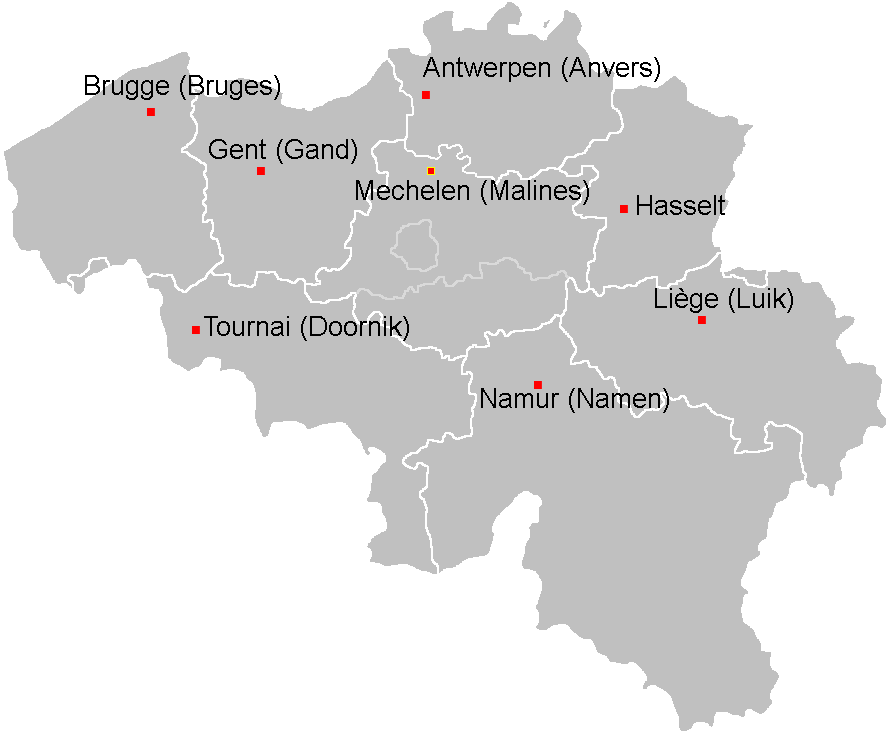
Catholic dioceses in Belgium

There are eight dioceses, including one archdiocese, seat of the archiepiscopal residence and St. Rumbolds Cathedral, located in the Flemish city of Mechelen (Malines in French). The Belgian church also oversees the Basilica of the Sacred Heart, the National Basilica of Belgium.

In 2009, Cardinal André-Mutien Léonard was appointed new Archbishop of Mechelen–Brussels and thus Belgium's new primate, but only after the 450th anniversary celebration of the Mechelen–Brussels archdiocese and the canonisation of Fr. Damien De Veuster of Molokai. Both events were led by Cardinal Godfried Danneels, his predecessor as archbishop and primate between 1979 and 2010. Before his appointment, Léonard was Bishop of Namur.

From 2015 until 2023, Jozef De Kesel was the Archbishop of Mechelen–Brussels and primate of Belgium. Luc Terlinden is the current archbishop.

Archdiocese / diocese	Est.	Cathedral	Co-cathedral	Weblink
Archdiocese of Mechelen–Brussels	1559	Cathedral of St. Rombald	Cathedral of St. Michael and St. Gudula	
Diocese of Antwerp	1961	Cathedral of Our Lady		
Diocese of Bruges	1834	Cathedral of the Saviour and St. Donat		
Diocese of Ghent	1559	Cathedral of St. Bavo		
Diocese of Hasselt	1967	Cathedral of St. Quentin		
Diocese of Liège	720	Cathedral of St. Lambert		
Diocese of Namur	1559	Cathedral of St. Alban		
Diocese of Tournai	450	Cathedral of Our Lady of Tournai		

== Education ==
The Belgian church established the Catholic University of Louvain in 1834, nowadays split into the Université catholique de Louvain and the Katholieke Universiteit Leuven (acronymic KU Leuven), which together comprise the largest university in Belgium. According to World University Ranking, KU Leuven is the best university in Belgium. The archbishop of Mechelen-Brussels is an ex officio member of the board of trustee in virtue of being the Grand Chancellor of both universities. Founded in Mechlin by the bishops of Belgium in 1834, the Catholic University moved to Leuven in 1835 to replace the State University of Leuven which was closed the same year. Some of its most notable graduates include Georges Lemaître, priest, astronomer, and proposer of the Big Bang theory, Otto von Habsburg, former head of the Habsburg family, Saint Alberto Hurtado, Chilean Jesuit priest who was canonised in 2005, Charles Jean de la Vallée-Poussin, mathematician who proved the prime number theorem, Christian de Duve, winner of the Nobel Prize in Medicine in 1974, among others.

Catholic schools in Belgium include:

- Brussels International Catholic School
- Collège Matteo Ricci, Brussels
- Collège Notre-Dame de la Paix, Namur
- Collège Saint-Paul (Godinne)
- Collège Saint-Servais (Liège)
- Collège Saint-Stanislas, Mons
- Collège Saint-François-Xavier, Verviers
- Flône Abbey
- Heilige Drievuldigheidscollege
- John of Ruysbroeck College, Laeken
- Our Lady College, Antwerp
- Sint-Barbaracollege
- Sint-Hubertuscollege
- St John Berchmans College
- St Joseph College, Aalst
- St Joseph College, Turnhout
- Sint-Leocollege (Brugge)
- Sint-Lievenscollege
- Sint-Lodewijkscollege (Lokeren)
- St Michael College, Brussels
- Xaverius College

== Health care and Catholic hospitals ==
Belgium has a mixed private and public health care system. Catholic institutions provide three-quarters of the hospital beds in Flanders and 42% in Wallonia, French-speaking Belgium. The Church also runs about a third of the nursing homes in the country.

== Demographics ==
Catholics in Belgium
year	Sunday Mass Attendance (%)	baptism (%)
1967	42.9%	93.6%
1973	32.3%	89.3%
1980	26.7%	82.4%
1985	22.0%	-
1990	17.9%	75.0%
1995	13.1%	-
1998	11.2%	64.7%
2006	7% (Flanders only)	56.8%
2009	5%

About 57% of Belgians identify as Catholic, though actual involvement in the church might be much lower. Like elsewhere in Northwest Europe, many no longer profess faith in the Church; Sunday church attendance has dropped well below 10% as per latest research such as from the "Centrum voor politicologie" of the Catholic University Leuven. Although sources are quoting different figures between 4 and 9%, a church attendance of 6% in 2009 seems to be the most likely figure. Sources are quoting a drop in attendance of 0,5% yearly and in 1998 (the last year during which mass attendance was measured), attendance was just above 11%. Early 2008, the Belgian Catholic Church announced it would gather and publish adherence figures though the current usual Sunday attendance statistics did not seem to bother Cardinal Godfried Danneels (1933-2019), who said he was more concerned with the declining number of new priests.

As of 2010, there were about 1900 priests in the archdiocese of Malines-Brussels, but most of them were either retired or on the verge of retirement. Only two were ordained in 2007.

A poll in 2017 found that 83% of Belgian Catholics supported legal same-sex marriage and 10% opposed it.

== Clerical sex abuse scandal ==
Like several other countries since the mid-1990s, Belgium has been affected by a clerical sex abuse scandal. Priests have been found guilty of sexual conduct with minors.

In 1992, Louis Dupont, the parish priest of Kinkempois, in Liège, was sentenced to five years in prison for the statutory rape of a 14-year-old girl. Dupont was allowed to serve his time under ecclesiastical supervision in a monastery.

In 1996, Louis André, parish priest of the hamlet of Ottré was arrested for the rape of two boys. He was set free eight months later. He was then ordered by Church authorities to leave his post and retire to a monastery, but he successfully resisted the order, supported by a group of his parishioners. Four years later, however, André was accused of several additional acts of sexual contact and rape, dating to between 1964 and 1996, including the rape of several girls under 10 years old, one of whom was his own niece. Although he denied any wrongdoing, he was convicted and served three years in prison before dying of cancer in 2003.

In 1997, a Belgian priest in Brussels, André Vanderlyn, was arrested for raping a minor, and he subsequently confessed to having intercourse with seven other people between 1968 and 1997.

In January 1998, Luc De Bruyne of the "Broeders van Dale" in Torhout was arrested for sexual abuse of four mentally disabled boys, while as a guidance counsellor in a "medico-pedagogic institute". He came to the attention of the institute in 1995, and was fired from his post. His religious order then sent him to Rwanda on the orders of the bishop of Bruges. In November 2005, De Bruyne and his colleague "brother Roger H." were sentenced to ten years in prison for abusing more than 20 mentally disabled people over 16 years. De Bruyne denied the allegations and appealed the verdict. At the time of the verdict he was no longer a member of the religious order, and he was married with two children.

In 1998, it was reported that a catechism textbook for Belgian children called Roeach 3 showed comic-book-style pictures of toddlers asking sexual questions and engaging in sexual play. The Belgian Catholic hierarchy stated that the textbook was intended for adolescents, and that the pictures were meant to convey the idea that young children experience lust, a prevalent theory in contemporary psychology. Nevertheless, the textbook was withdrawn after public protests by Catholics, which elicited media coverage as well as support from Church officials around the world. The editors of Roeach were Prof. Jef Bulckens of the Catholic University of Leuven and Prof. Frans Lefevre of the Seminary of Bruges. The name "Roeach" refers to the Hebrew word Ruach (Hebrew: רוח), meaning "spirit" or "breath".

In 2006, and in January 2010, Robert Borremans, who had officiated at the marriage of the prince and princess of Belgium, was convicted and found guilty of sexual conduct with two boys of 6 and 11 years old over a period of seven years from 1994.

On 27 November 2009, Bart Aben of the Diocese of Ghent was arrested for and admitted sexual conduct with two mentally disabled minors.

In April 2010, Roger Vangheluwe, Bishop of Bruges, resigned after allegedly admitting that he had sexually abused an unnamed boy in his "close entourage". The acts remain undisclosed and no criminal charges were against Vangheluwe, who has since retired to a Trappist monastery in Westvleteren.

After the resignation of Vangheluwe, the Catholic Church launched an investigating commission into allegations of clerical child abuse in Belgium, headed by the independent psychologist Peter Adriaenssens. The commission's work came to an abrupt end on 24 June 2010, when the Belgian police raided the offices of the Catholic Church in Belgium and sealed them. There were four raids in all, with thousands of documents seized. One of the raids involved drilling into the tombs of two cardinals. The Vatican was reported as being 'indignant' over the raids, saying they had led to the "violation of confidentiality of precisely those victims for whom the raids were carried out".

Nonetheless, the Adriaenssens commission published a 200-page report on 10 September 2010. According to the report, the commission heard allegations from 488 complainants, concerning incidents that took place between 1950 and 1990. The report contained testimony from 124 people, cited 320 alleged abusers, of whom 102 were known to have been clergy members from 29 congregations. Two-thirds of the complainants were men. Thirteen of the alleged victims committed suicide. In the years 2010 to 2016, 12,442 people in Flanders formally left the Catholic Church; half of these "debaptisms" were in 2010.

== Blessings for same sex couples ==
In 2022, the Flemish bishops approved a blessing ceremony for homosexual couples. The three-page document noted that "such a prayerful moment can be quite simple. The difference with what the Church understands as a sacramental marriage must also be clear." The document frequently quoted the apostolic exhortation, Amoris Laetitia, of Pope Francis. The intent of the initiative, the bishops said, was to welcome homosexuals and instruct dioceses to appoint a contact person "for pastoral work with them."

== Eastern Catholicism ==
There is a small Eastern Catholic community in Belgium, mainly Chaldo-Assyrians and Byzantines. On 18 February 2024, the first Byzantine rite ordination to the diaconate in Belgium was performed by bishops Johan Bonny (Latin rite) and Petro Holiney (Byzantine rite).

== See also ==
- List of Catholic churches in Belgium
- List of Christian monasteries in Belgium
- Forced adoption of children through the Catholic Church in Belgium
- Catholic Church by country
- Belgian Pontifical College
- Religion in Belgium
