= Jean Kockerols =

Auxiliary bishop to the Archdiocese of Mechelen-Brussel

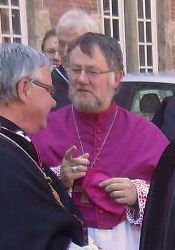
Jean Kockerols (with beard) accompanied by, amongst others, Frans Daneels at the Procession of the Holy Blood in 2011

Jean Kockerols (born 13 August 1958) is an auxiliary bishop of the Catholic Church in Belgium.

Kockerols was born in Brecht, Belgium. He was ordained a priest on 18 September 1993 and was later the Dean of Brussels-South. He was appointed auxiliary bishop of the Archdiocese of Mechelen-Brussel and titular bishop of Ypres by Pope Benedict XVI on 22 February 2011 and consecrated on 3 April 2011.

He is the former Grand Prior of the Belgian Lieutenancy of the Equestrian Order of the Holy Sepulchre of Jerusalem.

Coat of arms of Jean Kockerols
