= Jean-Luc Hudsyn =

Coat of arms of Jean-Luc Hudsyn

Jean-Luc Hudsyn (born 26 February 1947 in Uccle, Belgium) is a Roman Catholic auxiliary bishop in Belgium.

Hudsyn was ordained a priest on 25 June 1972. Later, he was episcopal vicar for Walloon Brabant (Brabante Vallone). He was appointed Auxiliary Bishop of the Archdiocese of Mechelen-Brussel and titular bishop of Apt by Pope Benedict XVI on 22 February 2011 and consecrated on 3 April 2011.
