= Paul Lanneau =

Belgian Roman Catholic bishop

Paul Lanneau (22 July 1925 – 26 January 2017) was a Roman Catholic bishop.

Ordained to the priesthood in 1949, Lanneau served as auxiliary bishop of the Roman Catholic Archdiocese of Mechelen-Brussels, Belgium from 1982 to 2002.
