= Jean-Marie Van Cauwenbergh =

Jean-Marie Van Cauwenbergh (1879–1950) was a Belgian auxiliary bishop and vicar general of the archdiocese of Mechelen.

== Life ==
Van Cauwenbergh was born in Lier on 28 March 1879, the eldest of a large family. His father, Florent Van Cauwenbergh, a notary, was mayor of Lier and would later serve as a member of parliament (1894–1921) and senator (1921–1923).

Jean Van Cauwenbergh was one of Désiré Mercier's first students at the Higher Institute of Philosophy and Leo XIII Seminary at the Catholic University of Leuven. He graduated Doctor of Philosophy in 1899, and then pursued theology at the Major Seminary, Mechelen, followed by studies at the Faculty of Theology in Leuven, graduating Bachelor of Sacred Theology in 1905. He was then appointed professor of dogmatic theology at the Major Seminary, as well as being responsible for student discipline. From 1911 to 1918 he was Vice-Rector of Leuven University.

During the sack of Leuven, he was held as a hostage by the invading Germans. In 1918 he was appointed dean of St Peter's Church, Leuven, leading the post-war restoration of the church.

In 1920, Cardinal Mercier appointed him vicar general of the archdiocese. In 1931 he was consecrated titular bishop of Synaus and auxiliary bishop to Cardinal van Roey. As vicar general he worked to establish new parish churches in the suburbs of expanding towns and cities.

He died in Leuven on 14 April 1950.
