= Godfried Danneels =

Belgian Roman Catholic Church cardinal

His Eminence Godfried Danneels
- Cardinal, Archbishop Emeritus of Mechelen-Brussels
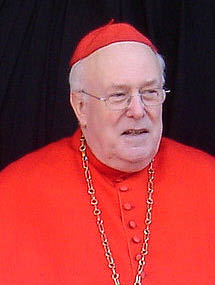
- Archdiocese: Mechelen-Brussels
- Province: Mechelen-Brussels
- See: St. Rumbold's Cathedral, St. Michael and St. Gudula Cathedral, Santa Anastasia al Palatino
- Appointed: 19 December 1979
- Term ended: 18 January 2010
- Predecessor: Leo Joseph Suenens
- Successor: André-Joseph Léonard
- Other post: Cardinal-Priest of Sant'Anastasia al Palatino
- Previous posts: Bishop of Antwerp (1977–1979); Bishop of the Military Ordinariate of Belgium (1980–2010)

Orders
- Ordination: 17 August 1957 by Emiel-Jozef De Smedt
- Consecration: 18 December 1977 by Leo Jozef Suenens
- Created cardinal: 2 February 1983 by Pope John Paul II
- Rank: Cardinal-Priest

Personal details
- Born: Godfried Maria Jules Danneels; 4 June 1933 Kanegem, Tielt, Kingdom of Belgium
- Died: 14 March 2019 (aged 85) Mechelen, Kingdom of Belgium
- Denomination: Roman Catholic
- Occupation: Theologian
- Education: Catholic University of Leuven, Pontifical Gregorian University
- Coat of arms: Godfried Danneels's coat of arms

Styles of Godfried Danneels
- Reference style: His Eminence
- Spoken style: Your Eminence
- Informal style: Cardinal
- See: Mechelen-Brussels

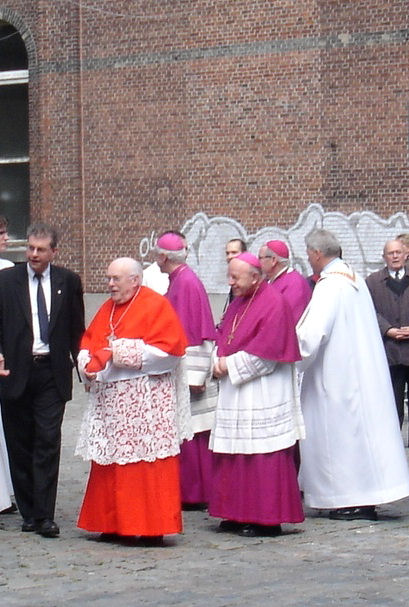
Cardinal Danneels in choir dress (left)

Godfried Maria Jules Danneels (4 June 1933 – 14 March 2019) was a Belgian Catholic prelate who served as Archbishop of Mechelen-Brussels and the chairman of the Episcopal Conference of Belgium from 1979 to 2010. He was elevated to the cardinalate in 1983.

== Early life and studies ==
Born in Kanegem, West Flanders, Godfried Danneels was the eldest of six siblings. He owed his vocation to the priesthood to a priest he had as a teacher in high school, Daniel Billiet. Like a few other bright candidates for the priesthood from West Flanders, Danneels did not enter the episcopal Seminary of Bruges after he finished high school, but was sent directly to the Higher Institute of Philosophy of the Catholic University of Leuven, there to follow a three-year course of Neo Scholastic philosophy (1951–1954). Leuven, with which he remained "in love" his entire life, opened the world for him intellectually. From Leuven he was sent to Rome, where he studied Catholic theology at the Pontifical Gregorian University whilst living in the Belgian Papal College (1954–1959). With a few exceptions, he judged the quality of his courses there inferior to those in Leuven, but Rome greatly enriched him culturally. Danneels obtained his bachelor's degree in June 1956, his license in 1958, and his doctorate in 1961.

His results as a student were uniformly very good, including an A− for canon law, and a magna cum laude for his license.

== Ordination ==
Well before the end of his studies, he was ordained to the priesthood by Emiel Jozef De Smedt, Bishop of Bruges, in a ceremony in the Kanegem parish church on 17 August 1957, the 25th wedding anniversary of his parents.

== Professor and pastor ==
In 1959, De Smedt appointed him spiritual director of the Bruges episcopal seminary and at the same time professor of liturgy and spirituality. In 1960 he also took over Frans Neirynck's course on the sacraments.

His study of the literature on liturgy made him evolve from a Rome-educated and initially conservative liturgist into a modern one, and a well-known one, thanks to his articles in the Dictionary of the Liturgy. The claim that he was actively involved in writing Sacrosanctum Concilium is dubious, for he did not attend the Second Vatican Council. But he did play a very active role in the implementation of the liturgical reforms of Sacrosanctum Concilium, not only in the Bruges diocese, but in all of Belgium and even abroad. He was very much taken with these reforms, for in Belgium and the Netherlands many had been foreshadowed in liturgical experiments. However, he did not call for liturgical revolution in his writings and talks, favoring steady and measured innovation instead. Even so, from the middle sixties he felt pressurized by Rome (in particular by cardinal Giacomo Lercaro), which was trying get a firmer grip on the liturgical journals in which he wrote.

On 8 July 1969, Danneels was appointed assistant professor at the Faculty of Theology of the Catholic University of Leuven. Initially the appointment was for two years, but Danneels was to stay until 31 January 1978, shortly after he was consecrated bishop. In Leuven he became thoroughly interested in what was to become his "hobby horse", the interlocking of theology and humanism, which he was to develop throughout his life in both his academic and his pastoral writings. The latter too were numerous and important, for when he was relieved of his spiritual directorship at the Bruges seminar in the summer of 1967, he was put in charge of the continuing education of the priests of the Bruges diocese.

== Bishop ==
Ordination history of Godfried Danneels
History
Episcopal consecration
- Consecrated by: Leo Joseph Suenens
- Date: 18 December 1977
- Place: St. James' Church, Antwerp
Cardinalate
- Elevated by: Pope John Paul II
- Date: 2 February 1983
Episcopal succession
Bishops consecrated by Godfried Danneels as principal consecrator
- Paul Van den Berghe: 1980
- Paul Lanneau: 1982
- Rémy Vancottem: 1982
- Luc De Hovre: 1982
- Roger Vangheluwe: 1985
- Albert Houssiau: 1986
- Jan De Bie: 1987
- André-Joseph Léonard: 1991
- Arthur Luysterman: 1991
- Aloys Jousten: 2001
- Cardinal De Kesel: 2002
- Guy Harpigny: 2003
- Luc Van Looy: 2004
- Johan Bonny: 2009

On 4 November 1977, Danneels was named Bishop of Antwerp by Pope Paul VI. He received his episcopal consecration on the following 18 December from Cardinal Leo Joseph Suenens; co-consecrators were his predecessor Jules Victor Daem and his Bruges bishop De Smedt. The consecration, in a Dutch-language rite in whose development Danneels himself had been involved as a liturgist, took place in St. James', as the Antwerp cathedral was being restored at the time.

Three days after his consecration he invited Catholics to write him personally with suggestions for their new bishop and he made the rounds of his diocese to consult with people. He used the media, extensively and successfully, to expound his vision of Christian humanism. In this he can be claimed to have been "modern". But in many ways he was traditional and careful of what Rome desired. From the beginning of his episcopacy, he faced an acute problem of numerous priests leaving their ministry. In spite of this, he energetically defended the traditional demand of the Church that priests remain celibate. In July 1978 he was appointed a member of the Curial Congregation for the Doctrine of the Faith, just at the time when Edward Schillebeeckx was first investigated by the Congregation. In the face of great pressure from the Leuven Faculty of Theology, he did not intervene on Schillebeeckx's behalf.

Encouraged and aided by his predecessor, Danneels began to build what was to become a very extensive network, which included numerous Belgian politicians. This would be important for his work in the next station of his life.

== Archbishop and cardinal ==
=== Promotion to archbishop and creation as cardinal ===
Danneels was promoted to the Archbishopric of Mechelen-Brussels on 19 December 1979. He thus became Primate of Belgium, president of the Belgian Conference of Catholic Bishops, chancellor of the Katholieke Universiteit Leuven and the Université catholique de Louvain and head of the nation's Catholic military ordinariate, at first as vicar, from 1987 as bishop.

Pope John Paul II followed the tradition that the Mechelen archbishop be made a cardinal, and created him Cardinal-Priest of Santa Anastasia in the consistory of 2 February 1983.

=== Survey of his career as cardinal and archbishop ===
There are two rather distinct periods in Danneels' career as cardinal and archbishop. In its first ten to fifteen years, Danneels' relations with Rome were excellent. He was appointed to a number of pontifical congregations and councils. In addition to the Congregation for the Doctrine of the Faith, to which he had already been appointed in 1978, he was a member of:

- the Congregation for Bishops
- the Congregation for the Clergy
- the Congregation for the Evangelization of Peoples
- the Congregation for Catholic Education
- the Congregation for Divine Worship and the Discipline of the Sacraments
- the Pontifical Council for Dialogue with Non-Believers

He was also a member of the permanent secretariat of the episcopal synod and participated in a number of synods But his own enthusiasm about the government of the Church by the Vatican waned. He did not approve of the way Pope John Paul II restricted the role of bishops' conferences such as CELAM (1992) and especially of CCEE (1993), in which he played a prominent role until 1993. The bishops' synods were being reduced to rubber stamping the decisions of Rome, and neither the bishops' collegiality nor Vatican centralism could be discussed.

The result of this change was threefold:

- As Rome was perceived to turn to the right, Danneels, who considers himself an "extreme centrist", was more and more perceived as a leftist or a liberal, in spite of himself.
- As Danneels gradually increased the distance between himself and Rome, his popularity at home increased and he became the face of the Catholic Church in Belgium, to the local issues of which he devoted more and more of his time.
- He also devoted more and more of his time to international tasks, which often involved his diplomatic abilities as well as his prestige.

After the 2013 conclave he again felt at ease in Rome, but by then he had already retired as archbishop.

=== Danneels and the Belgian court ===
As primate of Belgium, Danneels officiated at every great ceremony at the royal court.

==== Royal baptisms ====
- 1986: Archduke Amedeo of Austria-Este, later Prince of Belgium
- 2001: Princess Elisabeth of Belgium, later Duchess of Brabant
- 2003: Prince Gabriel of Belgium
- 2005: Prince Emmanuel of Belgium
- 2008: Princess Eleonore of Belgium

==== Royal funerals ====
- 1983: King Leopold III of Belgium
- 1993: King Baudouin I of Belgium
- 2002: Princess Lilian of Belgium, Princess of Réthy
- 2014: Queen Fabiola of Belgium

==== Royal marriages ====
- 1984: Princess Astrid of Belgium and Archduke Lorenz of Austria-Este
- 1999: Prince Philippe of Belgium, Duke of Brabant, later King of Belgium and Jonkvrouw Mathilde d'Udekem d'Acoz
- 2003: Prince Laurent of Belgium and Miss Claire Coombs
- 2008: Archduchess Marie-Christine of Austria (granddaughter of Princess Joséphine-Charlotte of Belgium, Grand Duchess of Luxembourg) and Count Rodolphe of Limburg Stirum
- 2014: Prince Amedeo of Belgium, Archduke of Austria-Este and Nob. Elisabetta Rosboch von Wolkenstein

Danneels' relations with the court were good, but not particularly close. He even denied having a close relationship with King Baudouin, whom he saw often and whom he greatly admired.

=== Synods ===
Danneels participated in a number of synods of bishops and played a prominent role in some of them, notably in:

==== Special Assembly for the Netherlands (14–31 January 1980) ====
Danneels chaired this synod, on "The Pastoral Situation in the Netherlands", together with cardinal Johannes Willebrands. Its central task was to overcome the divisions that were plaguing the Catholic Church in the Netherlands and the widening gap between Rome and many Dutch Catholics. Its final document was signed by all participants, but it was poorly received in the Netherlands, and the conflicts between the Dutch bishops among themselves and between some of them and their flocks continued.

==== Fifth Ordinary General Assembly (26 September – 25 October 1980) ====
Its theme was "The Christian Family". In a speech ("My best synod speech ever") Danneels stressed the values that were the foundations of Humanae vitae, but called for objectively analyzing the reasons why so many Catholics refused its teachings, and pointed out that many divorced Catholics no longer saw how canon law could be reconciled with the demands of God's mercy. Toward the end of the synod, on 24 October, his prestige was such that he was elected a member of the general secretariat of the bishops' synods with 124 votes, outpolling even Cardinals Joseph Aloisius Ratzinger (121 votes) and Basil Hume (110 votes).

==== Second Extraordinary General Assembly (25 November – 8 December 1985) ====
Devoted to "The Twentieth Anniversary of the Conclusion of the Second Vatican Council", its discussions revolved around the question "Shall we put the brakes on Vatican II, or shall we continue or even go beyond it?" Danneels was appointed its General Relator (rapporteur), and in this task he was assisted by Walter Kasper, then still a theology professor. Their final report was praised by the Pope and accepted almost unanimously. But its conclusions could be, and were, interpreted in both directions, and it left many decisions up to Rome, thus putting no stop to the centralizing tendencies in the Church.

==== Special Assembly for Europe (1–23 October 1999) ====
Its theme was "Jesus Christ, Alive in His Church, Source of Hope for Europe". Danneels' speech attacking the cultural pessimism prevalent among a number of Roman prelates impressed many council fathers as well as Pope John Paul II, who allowed him to go beyond the allotted time.

==== Third Extraordinary General Assembly (5–19 October 2014) ====
This was popularly known as the "Synod on the Family"; officially it was about "Pastoral Challenges of the Family in the Context of Evangelization". Danneels' intervention was brief, but his presence at the synod was notable, as it followed a personal invitation by Pope Francis.

=== Danneels and liberation theology ===
Danneels was aware of the risks of liberation theology and its political dimension. But when on 6 August 1984, the Congregation for the Doctrine of the Faith published Libertatis nuntius, its Instruction on Certain Aspects of the "Theology of Liberation" without even consulting him, though he was a member, he publicly denounced it in several interviews, for its procedure and, more importantly, for its overly intellectual approach of the concept of freedom, which failed to take seriously the pains caused by poverty and by political and military oppression. He was instrumental in preventing a condemnation of his friend Gustavo Gutiérrez, and he was pleased that the follow-up of Libertatis nuntius, Libertatis conscientia, the Congregation's "Instruction of Christian Freedom and Liberation", did not proclaim a definitive condemnation of liberation theology.

=== Danneels and the Belgian constitutional crisis over abortion ===
In March and April 1990, King Boudewijn's refusal to sign the law liberalizing abortion, drafted by Roger Lallemand and by Lucienne Herman-Michielsens and approved by Parliament, provoked a constitutional crisis. Both Danneels and Prime Minister Wilfried Martens had foreseen the King's refusal, and in the spring of 1989, Danneels had offered Martens to mediate in case of just such a crisis. Danneels had often discussed the moral dilemma the King faced, but denies mediating after the King's decision was taken. The words of two Ministers of State, Philippe Moureaux and Mark Eyskens, have been interpreted as meaning that he did. But neither Moureaux ["On évoquait une discrète et prudente intervention du cardinal" (A discreet and prudent intervention of the cardinal was recalled)] nor Eyskens ["Maar geen enkel resultaat" (But no result whatsoever)] say this in so many words. They may just as well have alluded to the earlier talks between Danneels and the King.

In a number of reactions to the VTM broadcast it has been claimed that Danneels counseled the King to sign the Lallemand–Herman Michielsens law. However, whatever Danneels said in conversations with the King, before, during or after this constitutional crisis, he has always respected any "colloque singulier" he had with the King. Since King Boudewijn is dead, Danneels took the secret of what he told the King to his grave. The claim that he advised the King to sign is pure speculation.

Danneels flatly denied he did: "Ik heb alvast nooit geprobeerd hem om te praten" (I certainly never tried to talk him [the King] round). Shortly after the law was published in the Belgian official journal, the Belgian bishops, including Danneels, issued a declaration in which they distinguished what is legally acceptable and what is morally desirable, and they unambiguously rejected the law morally. Danneels has never wavered from the conviction that "a society that encourages abortion of those that are born in the margins of society or that do not have the chance to be loved abandons its humanizing role and ultimately condemns itself".

=== Member of the group of Sankt Gallen ===
On 3 January 1999, Danneels became a member of St. Gallen Group, in which he was to play a prominent role.

=== Danneels' view on homosexuality and same-sex marriage ===
Danneels always objected to discrimination against homosexuals and he was always in favor of a juridical statute for stable relations between partners of the same sex. He said as much on 11 April 2003 in a private letter to Guy Verhofstadt, whose government had approved this. But he has always been opposed to calling such a statute "marriage". He repeated these views ten years later, in a newspaper interview in which he said:

[The Church] has never opposed the fact that there should exist a sort of 'marriage' between homosexuals, but one therefore speaks of a 'sort of' marriage. But it is not true marriage, that between a man and a woman, therefore you have to put another word in the dictionary. But that it is lawful, that the law can legitimately provide for it, that's something about which the Church has nothing to say.

=== Danneels' view on euthanasia ===
Long before Belgium liberalized its law on euthanasia, in a press conference on 31 January 1994, Danneels gave voice to the Belgian bishops' opposition to the idea. The issue resurfaced again, with a vengeance, in the spring of 2008, when famous Belgian author Hugo Claus chose euthanasia on 19 March and when three days later Danneels devoted his homily during the Easter Vigil to "the problem of suffering and death", without, however, mentioning Claus by name. Even so, this homily was widely interpreted as criticism of Claus' choice and heavily criticized. But shortly afterwards, on 13 April 2008, Danneels doubled down in "Het Braambos", a broadcast of the "Katholieke Televisie- en Radio-Omroep" (Catholic Television and Radio Broadcasting Organization):

"... [whether or not to liberalize the law on euthanasia] is a choice between two civilizations, a civilization of people who are, or want to be, in complete control of themselves, and a civilization in which there is still room for a God and for what transcends man ... I think it is an excrescence of a typical evolution, I would almost say a cancerous growth of consciousness, which was happy waking up during the Renaissance but which has taken almost cancerous proportions now, which is running amok."

=== Ecumenical activities ===
From the beginning of his archbishopric, Danneels kept cultivating the good contacts between "Mechelen" and Anglicanism that were started by Cardinal Mercier in the 1920s.

Likewise from the beginning of his archbishopric, Danneels made almost yearly visits to the Taizé Community. He mediated with the Vatican to make Pope John Paul II's visit to Taizé on 5 October 1986 happen. He regularly met with Brother Roger, on whom the Catholic University bestowed an honorary doctorate in 1990. But after Brother Roger's death, too, he kept fostering relations with Taizé, and from 29 December 2008 through 2 January 200 he hosted the 31st European Taizé meeting in Brussels.

Danneels was a member of the World Council of Religions for Peace, on which he sat until 2004. Starting in the summer of 2002, he was also active in one of its projects, the European Council of Religious Leaders, in which he remained involved through the first decade of the 21st century.

=== Diplomatic activities ===
Danneels was involved in the negotiations about the convent of the Carmelite nuns at Auschwitz after father Werenfried van Straaten had proposed, in 1985, to convert its temporary location in the former theater building into a full-fledged convent. Danneels involvement lasted until 1989, when Rome decided the issue and promised the nuns would move out. (But they remained until 1993, and left behind the Auschwitz cross.)

Between 1990 and 1999, Danneels was the international president of Pax Christi.

Danneels was a consistent and strong supporter of bishop (later cardinal) Monsengwo's attempts to foster democracy in Zaire, mediating between Belgium, Rome and Kinshasa. He was instrumental in Monsengwo's being awarded an honorary doctorate by the Catholic University of Leuven on 2 February 1993 and he gave the Laudatio himself.

Danneels worked long and hard to thaw the relations between China and the Catholic Church. In November 1985 he invited a delegation of official Chinese bishops, who had been invited to Leuven by the Catholic University, to lunch in his residence in Mechelen. A return invitation followed, but problems caused by the coexistence of the official and the underground Catholic Church in China led to Danneels having to postpone his visit. When it finally happened, in March 2005, Danneels had to cut it short, owing to the death of pope John Paul II on 2 April. But on 3 April the Chinese government issued a communiqué lauding Pope John Paul's efforts to recognize the Church's errors. Pope Benedict encouraged Danneels to continue his efforts and in March 2008 Danneels again went to China, where he addressed the Chinese Academy of Social Sciences and where he was allowed to encounter a number of rural Catholic communities.

=== Dealing with child sex abuse in the Belgian Church ===
Danneels was first confronted with the problem of sexual abuse in the Church in the aftermath of the Dutroux affair, when the authorities' call for victims of abuse to come forward revealed that there had also been cases of abuse in the Church. (But see also the Vangheluwe affair, below.)

The first to formally organize a contact point for victims of sexual abuse within the Belgian Church was Arthur Luysterman, the bishop of Ghent. That contact point was the model of the "Commission for Complaints about Sexual Abuse in Pastoral Relations", which the conference of the Belgian bishops (chaired by Danneels) organized on 4 November 1999.

Early in 1998 it became known that a priest of the archdiocese had raped a minor in 1968. Danneels volunteered to testify in court, the first time ever that a cardinal had appeared before a secular court in Belgium. Danneels said that he had known nothing about the abuse. The court held that the Catholic Church in Belgium—not the archbishop himself nor his auxiliary bishop—was guilty of failing to protect the victim, was civilly responsible, and imposed a fine of half a million Belgian francs (now ± €12,500 ). On appeal this verdict was quashed and only the abusive priest was held guilty.

On 6 December 1999 the authorities began proceedings against Robert Borremans, a priest of the archdiocese, well known because he had been the choral conductor at the marriage of Philippe and Mathilde (now King and Queen). Danneels relieved him of his pastoral tasks and had him struck from the government's payroll. Though convicted at first, Borremans was cleared in the end, when the allegations against him were found to be false.

==== Vangheluwe affair and its aftermath ====
From 1973 to 1986, Roger Vangheluwe, a priest since 1963 and the Bishop of Bruges since early 1985, sexually abused a nephew of his. Rik Devillé, a priest who had had a couple of conflicts with Danneels, said, after the scandal broke on 23 April 2010, that he had warned Danneels about Vangheluwe in the mid-1990s. In 2010, Danneels said that he did not remember this. But Danneels certainly knew about Vangheluwe's crime before the scandal broke because, in the beginning of April 2010, Vangheluwe had himself told Danneels that he had had a sexual contact with a minor. What Danneels did, or did not do, in the few weeks before the scandal broke, earned him a great deal of criticism, both at home and abroad. On 8 April, Vangheluwe pressured Danneels to accept a meeting with himself, his victim and the victim's relatives. At that meeting Danneels advised the victim to delay a public statement until Vangheluwe had retired. Speaking through a spokesman, Toon Osaer, Danneels explained that he had been unprepared for this meeting and that his proposal that the victim remain silent was "an improvisation". Danneels did not reveal this conversation to the Belgian bishops. At another meeting Vangheluwe, in Danneels' presence, made a private apology which the victim rejected. In the night of Monday 19 to Tuesday 20 April all Belgian bishops received an e-mail exposing Vangheluwe. This resulted in Vangheluwe's resignation on 22 April and its immediate acceptance by the Vatican on 23 April, as was revealed on the same date by Danneels' successor as archbishop, André-Mutien Léonard, at a press conference. In a press communiqué, likewise on 23 April, Vangheluwe publicly admitted his guilt and publicly apologized.

In the weeks after Vangheluwe's resignation, the "Commission for Complaints about Sexual Abuse in Pastoral Relations" (now often called the Adriaenssens Commission, after its chairman, child psychiatrist Peter Adriaenssens) received no fewer than 475 complaints about sexual abuse. On 24 June, in an operation code named Kelk ("Chalice") organized at the request of the Office of the Public Prosecutor, the archiepiscopal palace, Danneels' private apartment, the Leuven seat of the Adriaenssens Commission and even St. Rumbold's Cathedral (where the graves of Cardinal Mercier and Cardinal Suenens were broken into) were simultaneously searched for documents about cases of sexual abuse that could still be prosecuted (unlike that of Vangheluwe, beyond the statute of limitation). On 6 July, Danneels was subjected to an all-day interrogation by the Brussels branch of the Judicial Police. Later the search was judged to have been illegal and all documents seized were returned. Great damage to Danneels's reputation was caused by the publication in De Standaard and Het Nieuwsblad on 28 August 2010 of the transcript of tape recordings, made secretly, of the two meetings Danneels had had with the victim and his family. The transcripts revealed that the victim felt that he was not being understood and considered Danneels' manner to be inept.

For Danneels, the final chapter of the affair was his appearance, on 21 December 2010, before a parliamentary committee investigating sexual abuse in hierarchical relations. He emphatically stated that there had never been a policy of covering up or denying, let alone tolerating sexual abuse, that justice had to be done and that the Church must cooperate.

But even if that is accepted, Danneels was widely reproached for inaction in a matter in which the public expected him to be decisive. As an editorial in De Standaard of 1 September 2010 put it: "For days he kept the shock of Vangheluwe's confession to himself. He did not contact the ex-bishop again to convince him of what was inevitable: his immediate resignation. He did not refer the matter to the Adriaenssens Commission. And he did not involve his own successor, archbishop Léonard."

== Papal conclave of 2005 ==
Upon the death of Pope John Paul II in 2005, Danneels was listed as a possible successor (or papabile) although with weakened credentials due to the fact that he was an archbishop of a country where abortion, euthanasia and same-sex unions had recently been legalized and where, under his watch, church attendance and pastoral vocations have dropped to historical lows.

Danneels participated in the 2005 papal conclave. The pre-conclave discussions pointed out the direction which the conclave was to take. It elected Pope Benedict XVI. In a TV interview directly after this election, which he had promised—"foolishly", he said, because keeping this promise prevented him from attending the dinner with the pope and the other cardinals, and because he was tired—his body language indicated he was not enthusiastic, which was widely interpreted as indicating he was an opponent of the new pope. Danneels denies this: "That is not true, but I'll have to bear that charge until I die."

== Retirement and succession ==
On 4 June 2008, Danneels reached the mandatory age of retirement; his succession took time and did not go smoothly. The three names on the terna (list of three) of possible successors Karl-Josef Rauber, the papal nuncio, sent to Rome, were rejected, and so were the names on a second terna Rauber sent. It was not until 18 January 2010 that Rome imposed its own candidate and replaced Danneels as Archbishop of Mechelen-Brussels by André-Mutien Léonard, whom Rauber openly said "non era 'del tutto adatto' per Bruxelles" (was not totally suitable for Brussels).

== Papal conclave of 2013 ==
Danneels was not considered "papabile" before the 2013 conclave, in which he participated. Naturally he also participated in the cardinals' pre-conclave discussions, which he called "the most interesting discussions in all my life as cardinal", as they were far more open than those preceding the 2005 conclave, and as their main theme was the need for collegiality.

The conclave elected Cardinal Jorge Mario Bergoglio (whom Danneels, as a member of the St. Gallen Group, supported). The newly elected pope Francis invited Danneels to appear with him on the balcony when he first appeared after the Habemus Papam, as customary for the most senior cardinal-priest.

At Pope Francis' inauguration, Danneels pronounced the formal prayer for the new pope in the absence of the protopriest, Cardinal Paulo Evaristo Arns. He later described the result of this conclave as "een persoonlijke verrijzeniservaring" (a personal resurrection experience).

== Death ==
Danneels died on 14 March 2019 in Mechelen. His funeral services, with the King, Queen, other members of the royal family and numerous politicians attending, were held on 22 March 2019 in St. Rumbold's Cathedral in Mechelen, where he was buried in the crypt of the cathedral.

== Honors ==
- Danneels was awarded honorary doctorates by the Catholic University of Tilburg (2 September 2002) and by Georgetown University (3 March 2003).
- On 20 December 2003 Danneels won the "Castar", an award bestowed by CAnvas, De STAndaard and Radio 1 on "the man or the woman whose cultural, social, political or socio-economic contributions have been positive and remarkable."
- Danneels was ranked #90 in Les plus grands Belges (2005).
- To celebrate his 75th birthday, the Faculty of Theology of the Catholic University of Leuven organized a symposium in his honor.
- On 18 June 2010 he was made an honorary citizen of Mechelen.

== Miscellaneous ==
- His mother tongue was Dutch (both Standard Dutch and the Kanegem dialect, barely mutually comprehensible), and he also spoke English, French, German and Italian fluently, as well as Latin (at least during his studies in Rome).
- In addition to a minor dip toward the end of 1959, Danneels twice had serious health problems. In the spring of 1971, he suffered a depression, resulting from overworking himself in combination with failing to rest and recuperate from eye surgery. A prolonged period of rest in Kanegem, imposed by his bishop, put him back on his feet. On 4 March 1996, a routine medical check-up revealed life-threatening stenosis of the blood vessels around his heart and he underwent bypass surgery the same day.
- His Marian devotion was very strong. He even insisted on attending the Marian Hanswijk procession in May 1996, though still recovering from his surgery on 4 March.
- He was an ardent lover of art, in all its forms, and his taste is eclectic. In music, for example, he appreciated "the three Bs, Bach, Beethoven and the Beatles".

Catholic Church titles
Preceded by Jules Victor Daem	2nd Bishop of Antwerp; 1977–1979	Succeeded by Paul Van den Berghe
Preceded by Leo Jozef Suenens	2nd Archbishop of Mechelen-Brussels; 1979–2010	Succeeded by André-Mutien Léonard
Preceded by Leo Jozef Suenens	Primate of Belgium; 1979–2010	Succeeded by André-Mutien Léonard
Preceded by Leo Jozef Suenens	Bishop of military ordinariate of Belgium; 1980–2010	Succeeded by André-Joseph Léonard
Preceded by James Francis McIntyre	Cardinal-Priest of Santa Anastasia; 1983–2019	Succeeded by Eugenio Dal Corso
Preceded by Franz König	International President of Pax Christi; 1990–1999	Succeeded by Michael Sabbah
