= Collège Saint-Stanislas =

Saint Stanislas College
- Collège Saint Stanislas
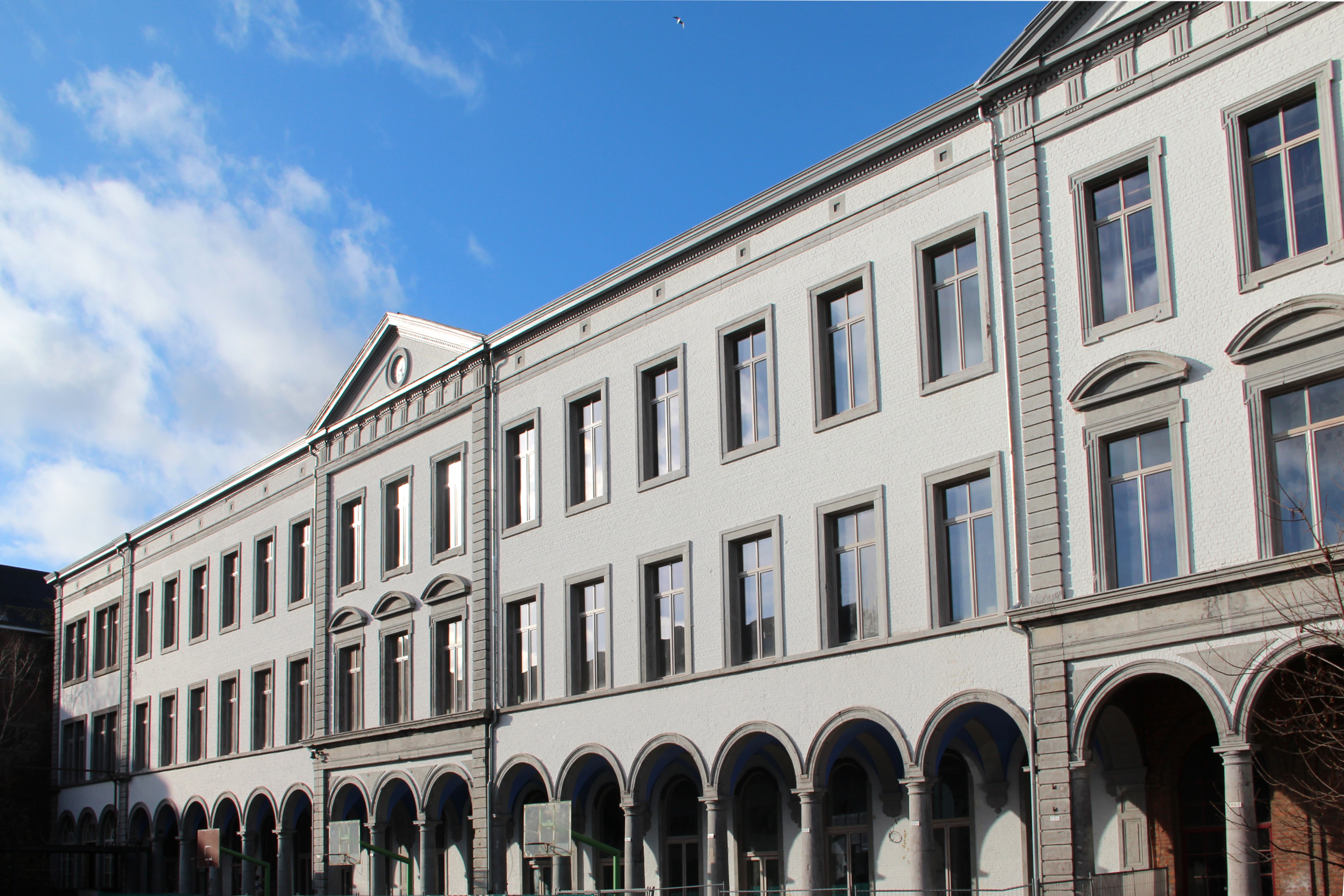

Location
- Mons; Belgium
- Coordinates: 50.457647°N 3.950342°E

Information
- Type: Secondary school
- Religious affiliation: Catholic
- Established: 7 October 1851
- Director: Thierry Heroufosse
- Affiliation: Jesuits
- Website: saintstanislas.be

Collège Saint-Stanislas is a mixed Catholic secondary school in Mons, Belgium. It was founded in 1851 by the Jesuits. It is located on Rue des Dominicains in the centre of Mons. Despite some disruption during the two world wars, the college has continued to have classes over the entire course of its history.

== History ==
After the restoration of the Society of Jesus and the independence of Belgium the Jesuits came to Mons in 1840 and worked on what is now Rue de Fétis. In 1845, they bought the old hotel of the Val de Beaulieu. They converted it into a school, added some temporary buildings, built a chapel and opened the school on 7 October 1851. From 1851 to 1879 more nearby buildings were bought and added to the school. On 8 November 1893, a fire destroyed some of the buildings in the area. After a week of repair work, classes resumed. Reconstruction work was done in the summer of 1894. In 1906, the neighbouring Rouwez Hotel was purchased, adding more space to the school.

During the First World War the school buildings were requisitioned at various times by the two sides. It mostly was used as a hospital by German and French forces. At the end of the war, it was a barracks for Canadian and New Zealand soldiers. Nevertheless, teaching continued in some form in other buildings of the school.

During the Second World War and the German invasion of Belgium in 1940, the college welcomed refugees and when the city was bombarded, the Jesuit community lived in the cellar, said Mass in the basement, but the buildings survived and were not damaged. While the city was occupied by German forces, classes continued and were fully subscribed during term time. The college was used by the occupying forces during the summer months of 1940 and the Christmas break of 1941.

After the war, from 1947 to 1950, the school was renovated, and again from 1966 to 1967. In 1971, female teachers began working at the school and in 1979 the school became mixed. The buildings on Rue des Dominicains and the church were demolished and between 1968 and 1979. Again, more renovation work was done between 2011 and 2015.

== See also ==
- Ratio Studiorum
- List of Jesuit sites in Belgium
- Diocese of Tournai
