= Arthur Luysterman =

Belgian Roman Catholic Bishop (born 1932)

His Excellency Arthur Luysterman
- Bishop emeritus of Ghent
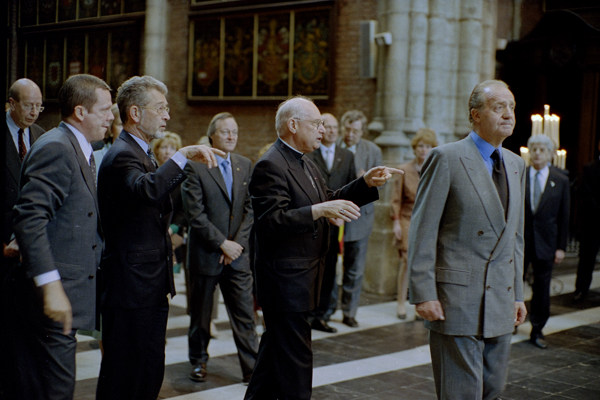
- Luysterman and Spanish king Juan Carlos in Gent
- Diocese: Ghent
- See: St Bavo's
- Predecessor: Léonce-Albert Van Peteghem

Personal details
- Born: 18 March 1932 (age 94) Meerbeke, Belgium
- Education: KU Leuven

Arthur Luysterman (born 18 March 1932) is a Belgian Roman Catholic Bishop. He served as the twenty-ninth Bishop of Ghent between 1991 and 2003.

== Life ==
Arthur Luysterman was born in Meerbeke, a village in the intensively developed countryside between Ghent and Brussels. He was the eldest of his parents' four children.

He attended school locally, obtaining a grounding in Graeco-Latin humanities at the St Aloysius College in Ninove and Our Lady's College, Dendermonde before abandoning an earlier ambition to become a lawyer and entering the seminary of Ghent in 1950: he was ordained into the priesthood on 26 August 1956.

He received a degrees and a doctorate in Canon law from the Catholic University of Louvain in 1959. After this he joined the military seminary in Aalst the produced military chaplains ("Centre d’Instruction de Base" / CIBE), initially as Professor of Moral Theology and later with more general responsibilities. However, over the years the number of candidates coming forward for training reduced, and in the end the institution was closed. After this, on 1 February 1973 he became chief chaplain to the Belgian armed forces, a post he retained till 13 July 1990.

On 13 July 1990 (a Friday) Pope John Paul II appointed Luysterman coadjutor bishop of Ghent. He was consecrated a bishop by Léonce-Albert Van Peteghem, the Bishop of Ghent, on 21 October of the same year. Just over a year later, when Van Peteghem retired on 27 December 1991, Luysterman succeeded him. He took as his episcopal motto "Et in terra pax" ("and Peace on Earth").

He was the founder of the Fund for Church Buildings in the Diocese of Ghent. During his time the number of seminarians declined and the episcopal seminary was closed, but he insisted that the quality of candidates for ordination was more important than their quantity. On 28 August 1994 he was a principal co-consecrator of the Flemish born Bishop André de Witte as bishop of Ruy Barbosa, Bahia in Brazil. On 11 October 2003 he was principal consecrator for Cardinal Joos.

After reaching the age of 70, Arthur Luysterman offered his resignation to the pope. This was accepted on 19 December 2003. Since then, as an emeritus bishop, he has nevertheless continued as a member of the Belgian Bishops' Conference.
