= Lode Aerts =

Belgian prelate of the Catholic Church (born 1959)

His Excellence, Mgr. Lode Aerts
- Bishop of Bruges
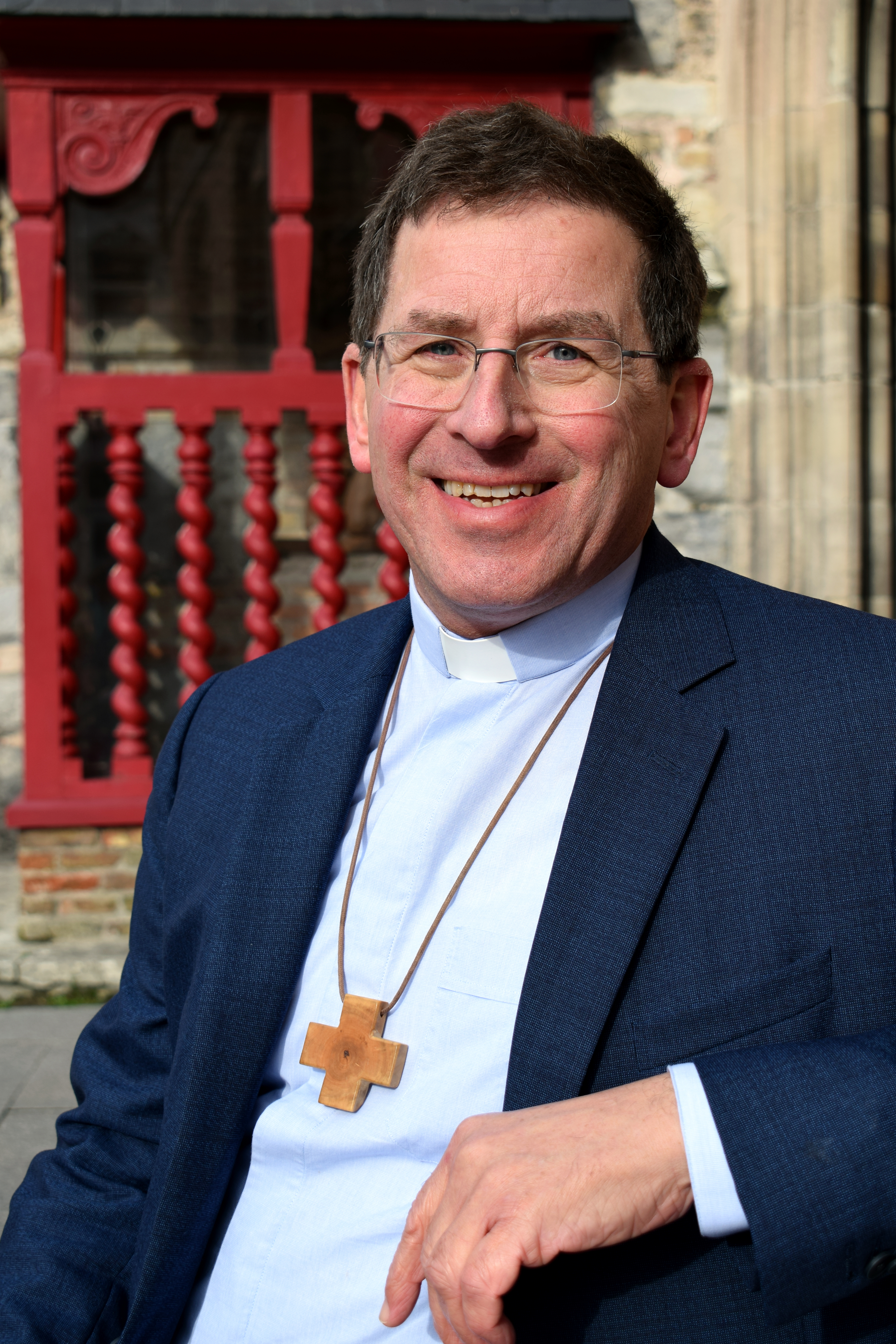
- Church: Latin Church
- Diocese: Roman Catholic Diocese of Bruges
- Appointed: 5 October 2016
- Predecessor: Jozef De Kesel
- Previous posts: Canon of St-Bavon, Dean of Ghent

Orders
- Ordination: 7 July 1984
- Consecration: 4 December 2016 by Cardinal Jozef De Kesel

Personal details
- Born: Lodewijk Aerts; 2 October 1959 (age 67) Geraardsbergen
- Education: Katholieke Universiteit Leuven; Pontifical Gregorian University
- Motto: Pretiosus in Oculis Suis (Precious in His eyes)
- Coat of arms

Lode Aerts (born 2 October 1959), identified also as Lodewijk Aerts, is a Belgian prelate of the Catholic Church who has been Bishop of Bruges since December 2016.

== Biography ==
Lode Aerts is a native of Geraardsbergen, diocese of Ghent. He attended secondary school in Eeklo and entered the Diocesan Seminary in Ghent in 1977. He studied philosophy at the Katholieke Universiteit Leuven and Theology at the diocesan seminary. He was ordained priest on 7 July 1984 and in 1988 obtained a doctorate in theology at the Pontifical Gregorian University. He taught at the seminary in Ghent from 1988 to 2002, when he became a canon of St Bavo's Cathedral, Ghent, and the diocesan vicar for vocations. In the summer of 2016 he became dean of Ghent Cathedral.

On 5 October 2016, Pope Francis appointed him to succeed Jozef De Kesel as Bishop of Bruges. As his motto he chose Pretiosus in Oculis Suis (Precious in His eyes). He was consecrated on 4 December by Cardinal de Kesel, in the Cathedral of Saint Saviour.

== Publications ==
- Nieuwkomers bij de bron: Als de Kerk naar jongeren luistert (Halewijn, 2003); French translation: Quand l’Eglise écoute les jeunes (2004)
- Drinken aan de bron: De smaak van het christelijk geloof (Halewijn, 2012).

Catholic Church titles
Preceded by Jozef De Kesel	Bishop of Bruges; 4 December 2016 – present	Succeeded by incumbent
