= Johan Bonny =

Belgian Catholic bishop

His Excellency Johan Bonny
- Bishop of Antwerp
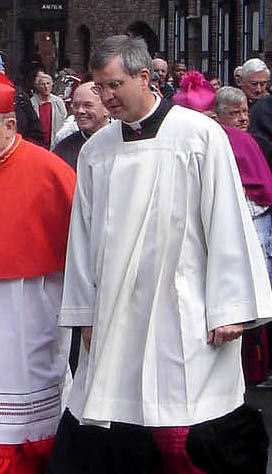
- Province: Belgium
- Diocese: Antwerp
- Installed: 4 January 2009
- Predecessor: Paul Van den Berghe
- Previous post: Pontifical Council for Promoting Christian Unity

Orders
- Ordination: 20 July 1980 by Emiel-Jozef De Smedt
- Consecration: 4 January 2009 by Godfried Danneels

Personal details
- Born: 10 July 1955 (age 70) Gistel, Belgium
- Denomination: Roman Catholic
- Coat of arms

Johan Jozef Bonny (born 10 July 1955) is a Belgian Catholic prelate who has served as Bishop of Antwerp since 2009.

== Biography ==
Johan Bonny was born in Moere (Gistel) on 10 July 1955, the oldest of five children born to Gustaaf Bonny and Marie-Jeanne Lootens, farmers. He attended primary school in Eernegem and Moere, lower secondary school at the Onze-Lieve-Vrouw Gistel College and higher secondary education at Sint-Janscollege in Meldert. In 1973 he entered the Bruges seminary.

== Priest ==
On 20 July 1980, he was ordained priest by Emiel-Jozef De Smedt, Bishop of Bruges. Bonny helped found a l'Arche community in Moerkerke and remained attached to it as a priest.

He obtained a bachelor's degree in philosophy in 1976 from the Katholieke Universiteit Leuven, a bachelor's degree in theology in 1979 from the Grand Seminary in Bruges, and in 1981 a licentiate in theology from the Pontifical Gregorian University in Rome. De Smedt then appointed him archivist and professor at the Seminary in Bruges, where he taught Church history, dogmatic theology, ecumenism and spirituality. At the same time, he worked with the renowned expert in Christian mystics Albert Deblaere. In 1988, he obtained a doctorate in theology from the Gregorian with a thesis on the Flemish mystic John of Ruysbroeck, entitled "Het ghemeyne leven in de werken van Jan van Ruusbroec" (English: The "common life" in the works of John of Ruysbroeck). In 1985 Roger Vangheluwe appointed him director of the department of theology and, in 1991, spiritual director of the Bruges seminary.

On 5 June 1997 he was appointed collaborator to the Pontifical Council for Promoting Christian Unity, where he was responsible for ecumenical relations between the Catholic Church and the Orthodox churches, mainly in the Middle East. He took part in theological dialogue with the Oriental Orthodox Churches, including the Coptic, Syriac, Armenian and Malankara Orthodox Syrian Church) and the Assyrian Church of the East. He also maintained the relationship between the council and a number of communities or movements, such as Taizé and L'Arche. While he was working in Rome, Cardinal Godfried Danneels and the Belgian bishops appointed him rector of the Belgian Pontifical College in Rome to succeed Werner Quintens.

== Bishop ==
On 28 October 2008, Pope Benedict XVI appointed Bonny bishop of the Diocese of Antwerp. He chose as his bishop's motto The Lamb will be their shepherd (Latin: Agnus pascet illos). On 4 January 2009, Bonny was consecrated a bishop in the Our Lady Cathedral by Danneels, assisted by Bishops Paul Van den Berghe and Roger Vangheluwe in presence of various religious and civil dignitaries, including Cardinal Walter Kasper and Archbishops Wim Eijk and André-Joseph Léonard.

In December 2014 Bonny called for Church recognition of gay relationships. He said: "There should be recognition of a diversity of forms. We have to look inside the Church for a formal recognition of the kind of interpersonal relationship that is also present in many gay couples. Just as there are a variety of legal frameworks for partners in civil society, one must arrive at a diversity of forms in the Church....The intrinsic values are more important to me than the institutional question. The Christian ethic is based on lasting relationships where exclusivity, loyalty, and care are central to each other." In September he wrote a letter in preparation for the Synod on the family that October. He stressed that the Church urgently needs to connect with contemporary society, showing more respect for homosexuality, divorced people and modern kinds of relationships.

In January 2015 he received an award from çavaria, the association of Flemish LGBT organisations, for his call for acceptance. Bonny however said the award was unnecessary.

Bonny had said that because Pope Francis did not voice specific opposition to the Flemish bishops' decision to bless same-sex unions, he has taken that as tacit approval. Bonny said he had "two conversations" with Francis from which he inferred he knew that the Flemish bishops were "not going against the Pope".

Bonny said Fiducia supplicans “helps us move forward.”

In March 2026 on the issue of priestly celibacy, Bonny stated that “The question is no longer whether the Church can ordain married men as priests, but when it will do so, and who will do it.” saying that he believes and is planning for his diocese to have married clergy by 2028.
