= Archdiocese of Mechelen–Brussels =

Latin Catholic ecclesiastical territory in Belgium

Archdiocese of Mechelen–Brussels Archidioecesis Mechliniensis–Bruxellensis Aartsbisdom Mechelen-Brussel (in Dutch) Archidiocèse de Malines-Bruxelles (in French)

Catholic
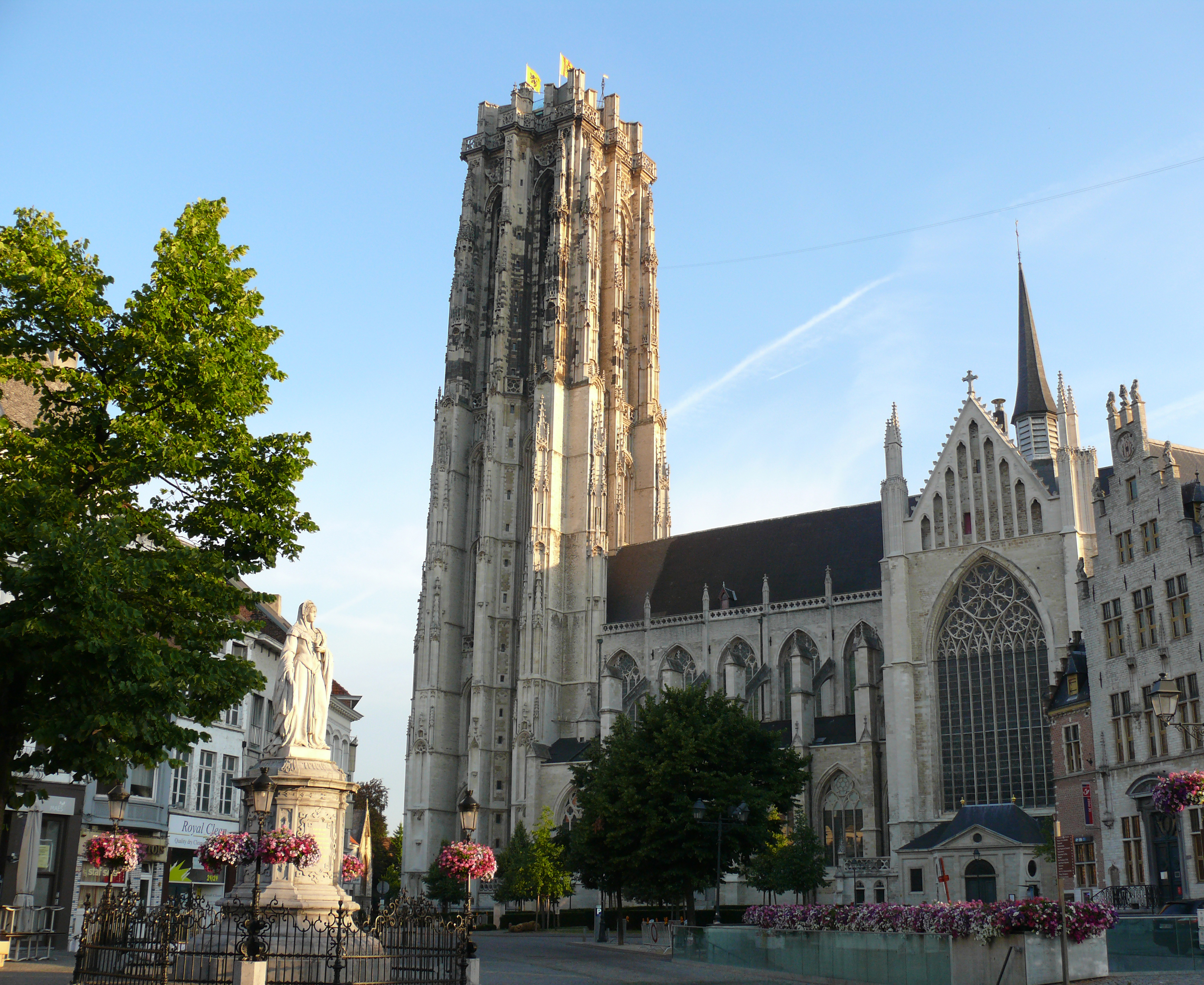
- St. Rumbold's Cathedral in Mechelen

- Coat of arms

Location
- Country: Belgium
- Territory: Mechelen, the Brussels-Capital Region, Flemish Brabant and Walloon Brabant
- Ecclesiastical province: Mechelen-Brussels
- Coordinates: 51°1′48.4″N 4°28′43.6″E

Statistics
- Area: 3,700 km^{2} (1,400 sq mi)
- Population: Total; Catholics: (as of 2019); 2,950,000; 1,886,000 (63.9%)
- Parishes: 593

Information
- Denomination: Catholic Church
- Sui iuris church: Latin Church
- Rite: Roman Rite
- Established: 12 May 1559
- Cathedral: St. Rumbold (Mechelen) (Primatial cathedral)
- Co-cathedral: St. Michael and Gudula (Brussels)
- Patron saint: Saint Rumbold of Mechelen
- Secular priests: 1812

Current leadership
- Pope: Leo XIV
- Archbishop: Luc Terlinden
- Suffragans: Antwerp; Bruges; Ghent; Hasselt; Namur; Tournai; Liège
- Auxiliary Bishops: Jean Kockerols; Jean-Luc Hudsyn; Koenraad Vanhoutte
- Vicar General: Etienne Van Billoen
- Bishops emeritus: André-Joseph Léonard; Jan De Bie; Jozef De Kesel

Map
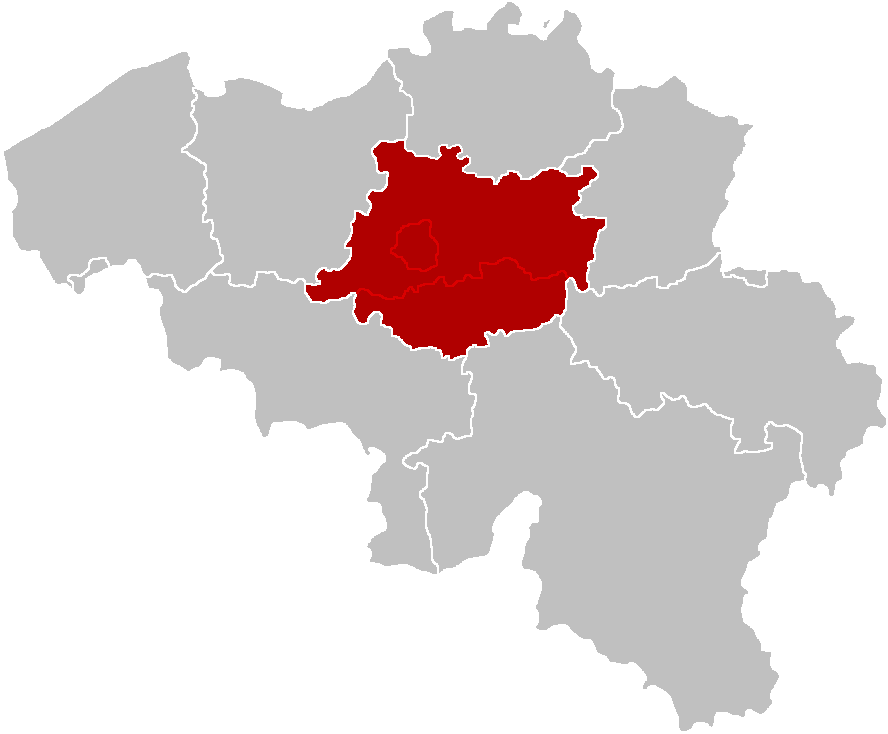
- Territorial extent of the Archidiocese of Mechelen-Brussels

Website
- www.cathobel.be/dioceses/archidiocese-de-malines-bruxelles/

The Archdiocese of Mechelen–Brussels (Latin: Archidioecesis Mechliniensis–Bruxellensis) is a Latin Church ecclesiastical territory or archdiocese of the Catholic Church in Belgium. It is the primatial see of the whole of Belgium. Additionally it is the centre of the local ecclesiastical province governed by the Archbishop of Mechelen–Brussels, which covers the middle of the country corresponding to the now defunct Belgian Province of Brabant and a few other municipalities adjacent to it.

The Archdiocese was formed in 1559, and the bishop has a seat in two cathedrals, St. Rumbold's Cathedral in Mechelen and the Cathedral of St. Michael and St. Gudula in Brussels. The current archbishop is Luc Terlinden, who was installed in September 2023.

== Overview ==
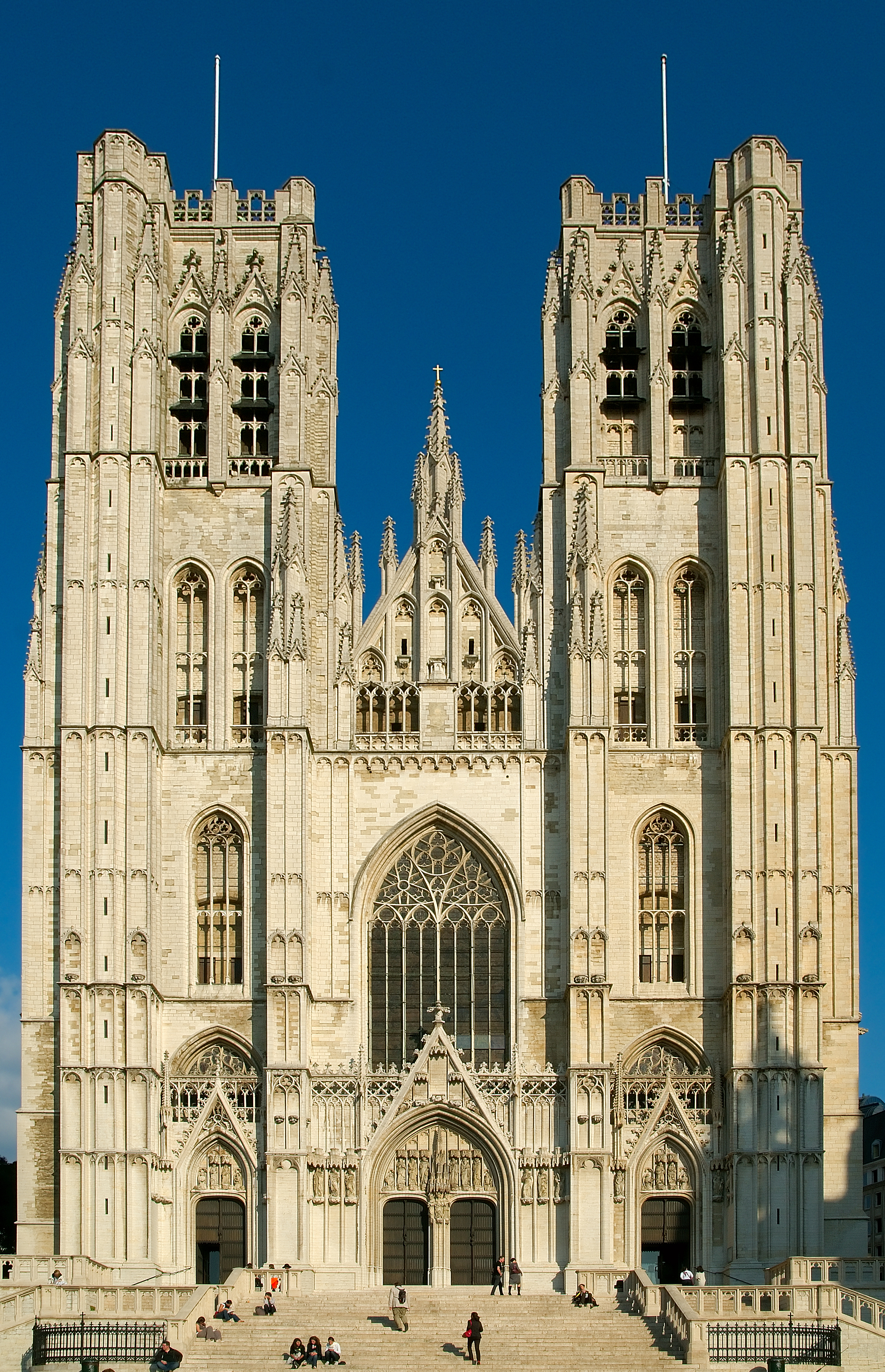
St. Michael and St. Gudula Cathedral, Brussels

The Archdiocese of Mechelen–Brussels consists of an area corresponding to the former Province of Brabant in addition to eight municipalities in the Province of Antwerp, including Bonheiden, Duffel, Mechelen and Sint-Katelijne-Waver.

In 1995, then existing Province of Brabant was split into three areas in a Belgian government reorganization:

- the Dutch-speaking province of Flemish Brabant;
- the bilingual Brussels-Capital Region;
- the French-speaking province of Walloon Brabant.

The Church did not form new dioceses to fit with this; instead, three vicariates general were created, with their own auxiliary bishop, to accommodate the three regional entities.

== Language issues ==
The name differs in the diocese's two languages; the Dutch name of the see is Mechelen–Brussel and in French, it is called Malines–Bruxelles.

Mechelen was traditionally called Mechlin or Malines in English, but in recent decades the modern Dutch variant has become the norm.

== Cathedrals ==
The duality of the Belgian archbishopric is also reflected in its status with two active co-cathedrals: with St. Rumbold's in Mechelen and St. Michael and St. Gudula in Brussels.

== Collegiate churches and chapters ==
Former chapters in the archdiocese.

- Chapter of Our-Lady: Cathedral of Mechelen
- Chapter of Saint-Peter: Leuven
- Chapter of Saint John the Baptist: Diest
- Chapter of Saint-Sulpicius: Diest
- Chapter of Our-Lady: Aarschot
- Chapter of Saint-Leonard: Zouleeuw
- Chapter of Saint-Germanus: Tienen
- Chapter of Saint-Michael and Gudule: Brussels Cathedral
- Chapter of Saint-Peter: Anderlecht
- Chapter of Our Lady and Saint-Martin: Aalst
- Chapter of Saint-Peter: Ninove
- Chapter of Saint-Peter: Rosmay
- Chapter of Saint-Hermes
- Chapter of Saint-Berland: Meerbeek
- Chapter of Saint-Paul: Nivelles
- Chapter of Saint-Gertrud: Nivelles

== Abbeys ==
In the territory of the diocese important abbeys can be found:

- Averbode Abbey
- Affligem Abbey
- Bornem Abbey
- Forest Abbey
- Grimbergen Abbey
- Groenendael Priory
- Dieleghem Abbey
- St. Bernard's Abbey, Hemiksem
- Keizersberg Abbey
- Kortenberg Abbey
- La Cambre Abbey
- Park Abbey
- Rouge-Cloître Abbey
- Vlierbeek Abbey
- Sheen Anglorum Charterhouse

== History ==
The Archbishop of Mechelen was historically primate of the whole of the Low Countries following the 1559 reorganisation creating fifteen dioceses. Over time, the two other ecclesiastical provinces broke from Mechelen's primacy. Cambrai was already in France and its kings managed gradually to annex southern French Flanders, and Utrecht and its suffragans in the Dutch republic (later kingdom) would long have their hierarchy suspended because the northern state broke away to be the champion of "anti-papist" Calvinism. The Napoleonic 1801 concordat re-drew the whole map again.

The country, by tradition, has the Archbishop of Mechelen made a cardinal.

Pope Gregory XVI wrote to François-René Boussen, Bishop of Bruges in Belgium, on 28 May 1845, commending the latter's diocese for an initiative whereby couples who were living together (i poveri concubinari) were encouraged to consider entering into a sacramental Catholic marriage. The Pope's letter referred to a similar initiative in the Mechelen diocese.

The Archdiocese of Mechelen was renamed the Archdiocese of Mechelen–Brussels on 8 December 1961 as part of a restructuring of the Catholic dioceses in Belgium. Two new dioceses were created. On the same day, the Diocese of Antwerp was created from areas previously administered by the Archdiocese of Mechelen. Six years later the Diocese of Hasselt was also created. This meant that the new dioceses largely corresponding to the provinces of Belgium. Most of the Catholic Church's presence in the Province of Antwerp (except in the municipality of Mechelen) was made into the Diocese of Antwerp.

Archbishop André-Joseph Leonard succeeded Cardinal Danneels in January 2010. On 22 February 2011, Pope Benedict XVI appointed Fr. Jean Kockerols, Fr. Jean-Luc Hudsyn, and Fr. Leon Lemmens as auxiliary bishops of the Archdiocese of Mechelen-Brussels. Upon reaching 75 years Leonard tendered his resignation, which was accepted. In the autumn of 2015 Pope Francis appointed the bishop of Bruges, Jozef De Kesel, as the new archbishop, who was created Cardinal in 2016. De Kesel was succeeded on 3 September 2023 by Luc Terlinden.

== Heraldry ==
Coat of arms of Archdiocese of Mechelen–Brussels
Adopted 1961, when the name of the archdiocese was changed. Escutcheon Quarterly 1st and 4th, Or a lion rampant Gules armed and langued Azure within a double tressure flory-counter-flory of the second (Scotland), 2nd and 3rd quarterly, Gules St-Michael Or, slaying the demon Sable (the City of Brussels). Previous versions From 1559 to 1961: Or a lion rampant Gules armed and langued Azure within a double tressure flory-counter-flory of the second (Scotland)

== Bishops ==
=== Ordinaries ===
==== Archbishops of Mechelen ====
1. Cardinal Antoine Perrenot de Granvelle (1561–1582)
2. Joannes Hauchin (1583–1589)
3. Mathias Hovius (1596–1620)
4. Jacobus Boonen (1621–1655)
5. Andreas Creusen (1657–1666)
6. Joannes Wachtendonck (1667–1668)
7. Alphonse de Berghes (1670–1689)
8. Humbertus Guilielmus de Precipiano (1690–1711)
9. Thomas-Philippe d'Alsase (1715–1759) (Cardinal in 1719)
10. Joannes-Henricus von Franckenberg (1759–1801) (Cardinal in 1778)
11. Jean-Armand de Bessuéjouls Roquelaure (1802–1809)
12. Dominique-Georges-Frédéric Dufour de Pradt (1809–1817)
13. François Antoine Marie Constantin de Méan et de Beaurieux (1817–1831)
14. Engelbert Sterckx (1832–1867) (Cardinal in 1838)
15. Victor-Auguste-Isidore Dechamps (1867–1883) (Cardinal in 1875)
16. Pierre-Lambert Goosens (1884–1906) (Cardinal in 1889)
17. Desiré-Félicien-François-Joseph Mercier (1906–1926) (Cardinal in 1907)
18. Jozef-Ernest van Roey (1926–1961) (Cardinal in 1927)

==== Archbishops of Mechelen-Brussels ====
1. Leo Joseph Suenens (1962–1979), see name changed 2 weeks after 1961 appointment (Cardinal in 1962)
2. Godfried Danneels (1979–2010) (Cardinal in 1983)
3. André-Joseph Léonard (2010–2015)
4. Jozef De Kesel (2015–2023) (Cardinal in 2016)
5. Luc Terlinden (2023–present)

=== Coadjutor Archbishop ===
- Christoph Bartholomäus Anton Migazzi Von Waal Und Sonnenthurn ( 1751-1756), resigned (did not succeed to this see), and soon appointed Bishop of Vác, Hungary; future Prince-Archbishop of Vienna (1757-1803 ) and Cardinal (1761)

=== Auxiliary Bishops ===
- Charles André Anthonis (1868-1893)
- Étienne Joseph Carton de Wiart (1934-1945), appointed Bishop of Tournai
- Jan De Bie (1987-2009)
- Luc Alfons De Hovre, S.J. (1982-2002)
- Josef De Kesel (2002-2010), appointed Bishop of Bruges; later returned here as Archbishop; future Cardinal
- Emiel-Jozef De Smedt 1950–1952), appointed Bishop of Bruges
- Jean-Luc Hudsyn (2011-)
- Jean Kockerols (2011-)
- Paul Lanneau (1982-2002)
- Louis Joseph Legraive (1907-1940)
- Léon Lemmens (2011-2017)
- Pepin de Rosa, O.P. (1562-1569)
- Paul Constant Schoenmaekers (1952-1986)
- Leo Jozef Suenens (1945-1961), appointed Archbishop here; future Cardinal
- Jean-Marie Van Cauwenbergh (1930-1950)
- Victor-Jean-Joseph-Marie van den Branden de Reeth (1879-1909)
- Josephus Franciscus van der Stappen (1893-1908)
- Honoré Marie Van Waeyenbergh (1954-1971)
- Rémy Victor Vancottem (1982-2010), appointed Bishop of Namur
- Koenraad Vanhoutte (2018-)
- Ghislain de Vroede (1570-1579)
- Antoine Alphonse de Wachter (1909-1932)

=== Other priests of this diocese who became bishops ===
- Joseph-Léon Cardijn, appointed titular archbishop and Cardinal in 1965
- Amédée Marie Léon Crooy (Crooij), appointed Bishop of Tournai in 1915
- Victor-Auguste-Isidore Dechamps, C.SS.R. (priest here, 1834–1836), appointed Bishop of Namur {Namen} in 1865; later returned here as Archbishop; future Cardinal
- Maximilien de Fürstenberg, appointed apostolic delegate and titular archbishop in 1949; future Cardinal
- Louis-Joseph Delebecque, appointed Bishop of Ghent in 1838
- Pierre-Lambert Goossens, appointed Coadjutor Bishop of Namur in 1883; later returned here as Archbishop; future Cardinal
- Jean Jadot, appointed apostolic delegate and titular archbishop in 1968
