= Jean Mone =

Brabant sculptor (c. 1500 – c. 1548)

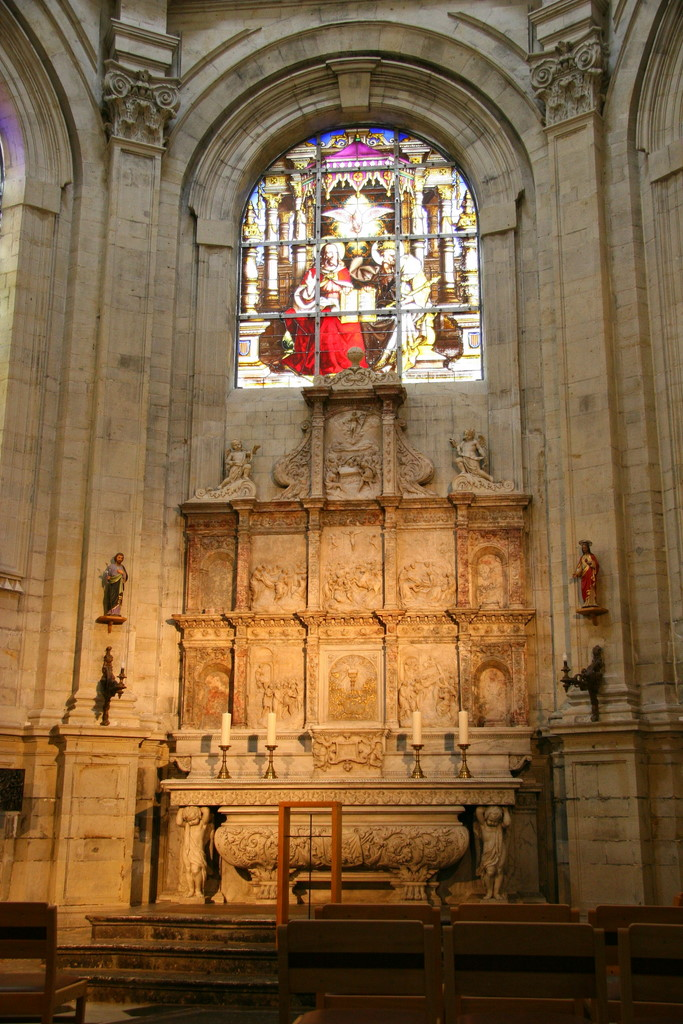
The alabaster altar in the Maes Chapel of the Cathedral of St. Michael and St. Gudula in Brussels. This shows the Passion of Christ and was made around 1538–1541 by Jean Mone. This is one of the first reredos in stone on the Low Countries, all previous examples were carved in wood.

Jean Mone (c. 1500 – c. 1548) was a Brabant sculptor, summoned from Spain to the Netherlands by Holy Roman Emperor Charles V in 1520.

Mone was born in Metz. He worked to introduce Italian Renaissance style to Brabant's sculpture. Mone spent most of his career in the Netherlands and worked in Brussels, Antwerp and Mechelen. The high altar near Brussels (1533) was one of his first works for the Emperor. He did also the statues of St Peter and Paul in the King's House in Brussels. He died in Brussels.
