= List of cathedrals in Belgium =

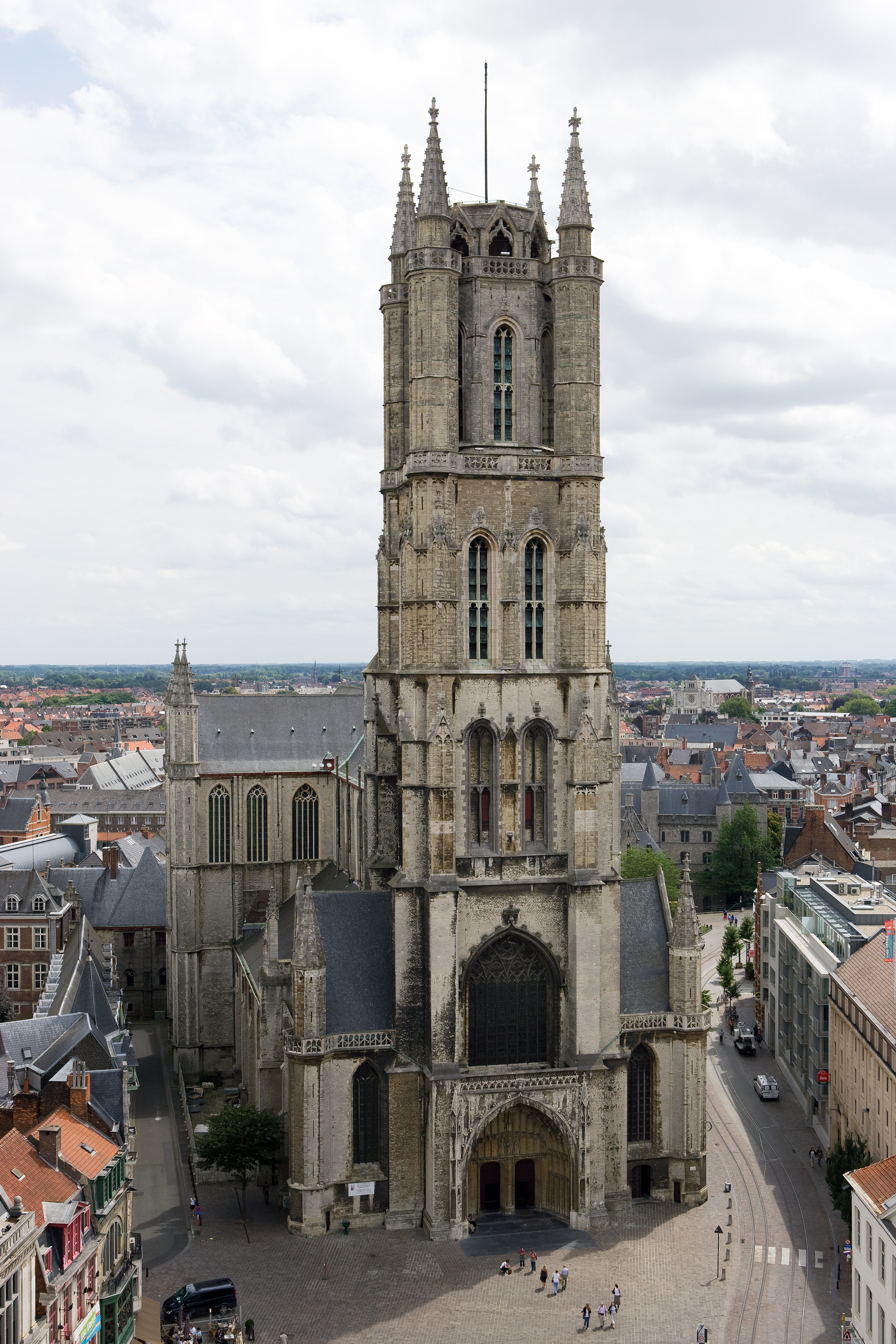
St. Bavo's Cathedral in Ghent

This is the list of cathedrals in Belgium sorted by denomination.

== Catholic ==
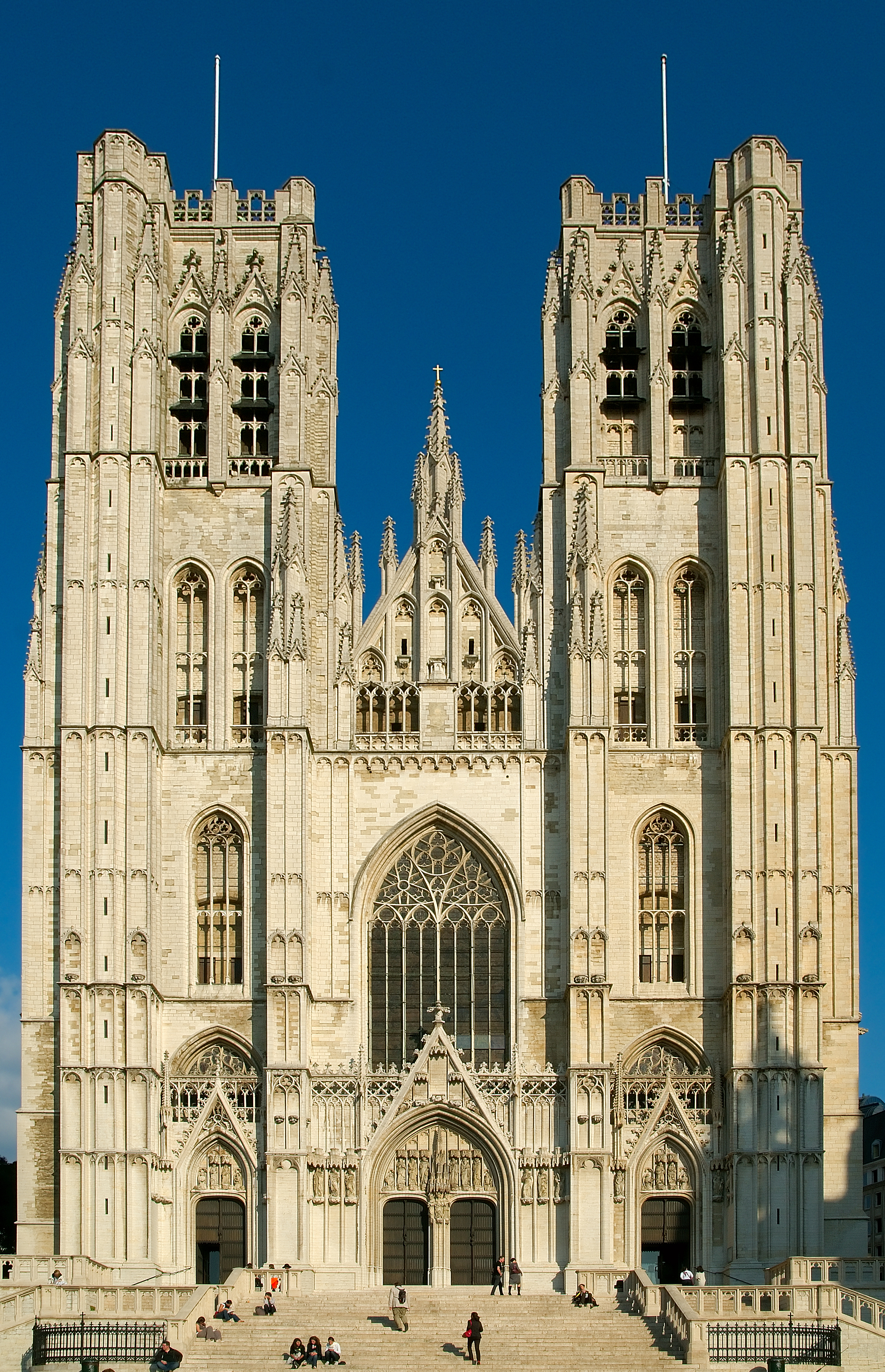
Co-Cathedral of St. Michael and St. Gudula in Brussels

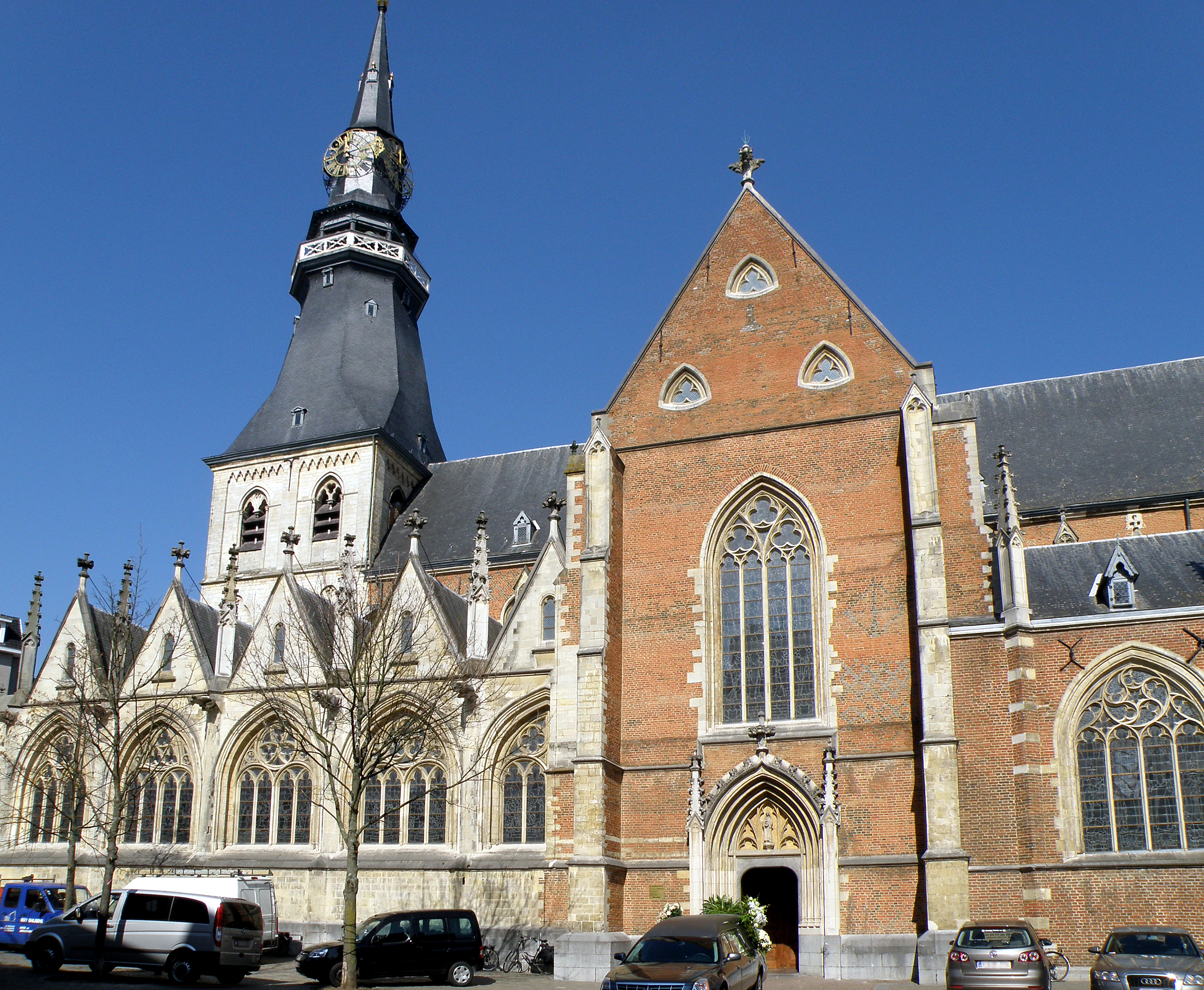
St. Quentin's Cathedral in Hasselt

Catholic cathedrals in Belgium:

- Cathedral of Our Lady in Antwerp
- Abbatial Cathedral of St. James on Coudenberg in Brussels (of the Military Ordinariate of Belgium)
- Co-Cathedral of St. Michael and St. Gudula in Brussels
- St. Salvator's Cathedral in Bruges
- St. Bavo's Cathedral in Ghent
- St. Quentin's Cathedral in Hasselt
- St. Paul's Cathedral in Liège
- St. Rumbold's Cathedral in Mechelen
- St. Aubin's Cathedral in Namur
- Cathedral of Our Lady in Tournai

== Anglican ==
Church of England cathedrals in Belgium:

- Holy Trinity Pro-Cathedral in Brussels

== Eastern Orthodox ==
Russian Orthodox cathedrals in Belgium:

- The Cathedral Church of St. Nicholas in Brussels

Greek Orthodox (Patriarchate of Constantinople) cathedrals in Belgium:

- Cathedral of the Holy Archangels Michael and Gabriel in Brussels

== See also ==
- List of cathedrals
