= Torrentius =

Torrentius may refer to:

- Johannes Torrentius, alias of Johannes van der Beeck (1589–1644), Dutch painter
- Laevinus Torrentius, Flemish humanist, Neo-Latin poet and second bishop of Antwerp born Lieven van der Beke (1525–1595)
