= Son en Breugel =

- Municipality
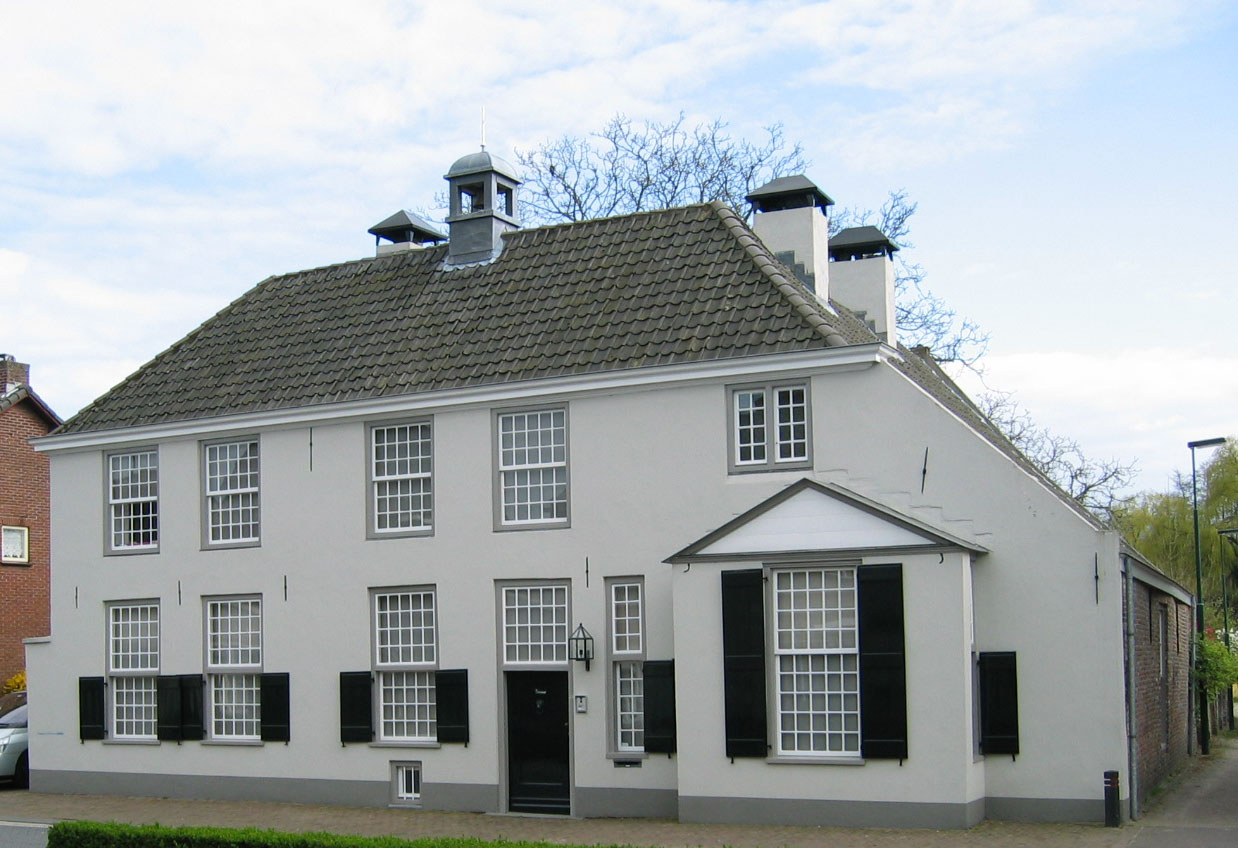
- Monumental home in Son

- Flag Coat of arms

- Location in North Brabant
- Coordinates: 51°31′N 5°30′E
- Country: Netherlands
- Province: North Brabant

Government
  - Body: Municipal council
  - Mayor: Suzanne Otters-Bruijnen (VVD)

Area
  - Total: 26.51 km^{2} (10.24 sq mi)
  - Land: 25.95 km^{2} (10.02 sq mi)
  - Water: 0.56 km^{2} (0.22 sq mi)
- Elevation: 16 m (52 ft)

Population (January 2021)
  - Total: 17,552
  - Density: 676/km^{2} (1,750/sq mi)
- Time zone: UTC+1 (CET)
  - Summer (DST): UTC+2 (CEST)
- Postcode: 5690–5694
- Area code: 0499
- Website: www.sonenbreugel.nl

Son en Breugel (Dutch pronunciation: [ˈsɔn ɛm ˈbrøːɣəl]) is a municipality in the southern Netherlands just outside Eindhoven. The municipality covers an area of 26.51 km^{2} (10.24 sq mi) of which 0.56 km^{2} (0.22 sq mi) is water. It had a population of 17,552 in 2021. Son en Breugel used to be two different villages: 'Son' and 'Breugel', with the stream of the Dommel separating the two villages. Son en Breugel also borders the following larger municipalities: Eindhoven, Meierijstad, Nuenen, Gerwen en Nederwetten, and Best. The spoken language is North Meierijs (an East Brabantian dialect, which is very similar to colloquial Dutch).

== Population centres ==
- Breugel
- Son

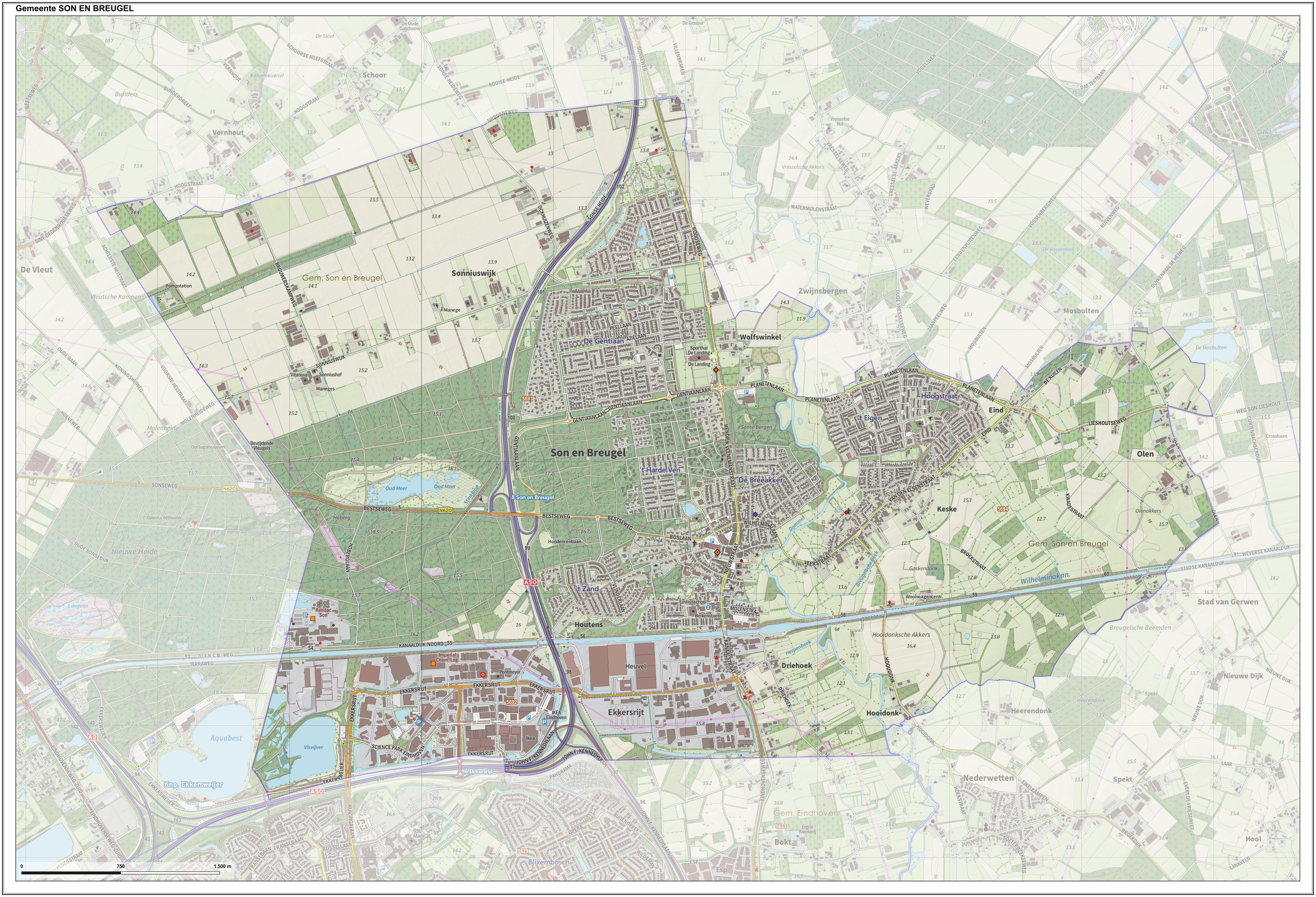
Map of the municipality of Son en Breugel, June 2015

== History ==
The villages of Son and Breugel were founded between the 12th and 14th centuries. The villages developed quickly; some 300 households (150 household for each village) occupied the two villages during the 15th century.

According to Karel van Mander's 1604 Schilder-boeck, the painter Pieter Bruegel the Elder was born in the village of Breugel.

Both Son as well as Breugel were hit badly during the Eighty Years' War, and the number of households in the two villages shrank down to approximately 140 (which translates to approximately 600 - 800 inhabitants). However, both villages managed to recover from this setback.

During the reign of Napoleon, both villages were combined into one municipality. Until the beginning of the 20th century, the population stayed relatively stable at about 1,500 inhabitants. However, between 1910 and 1940 the population increased from 1,600 to 3,500 inhabitants when people started moving to the village for economic reasons. It was the scene of heavy fighting at the end of the Second World War, particularly during Operation Market Garden. From 1960 onwards, Son en Breugel continued to grow. As of January 1 2024, the number of inhabitants was estimated at 17,000.

== Future ==
Currently, the number of households in Son en Breugel has reached 6,000. The combined village is expected to grow by about 3,000 households in the coming years, a growth of 50% (to be confirmed after a MER investigation as of March 2008), the result of which would prevent the municipality from being absorbed within the larger neighbouring municipality of Eindhoven.

Starting early 2009, a new neighbourhood will be developed within the combined village. This neighbourhood, called 'Sonniuspark', will contain 600 households and will be finished in 2013.

== Politics ==
This municipality has a local council of 17 seats. After the 2026 municipal elections this had the following distribution:

Party	Seats
DorpsVISIE	5 / 17
People's Party for Freedom and Democracy	5 / 17
Christian Democratic Appeal	3 / 17
Democrats 66	2 / 17
Labour Party-GreenLeft	2 / 17

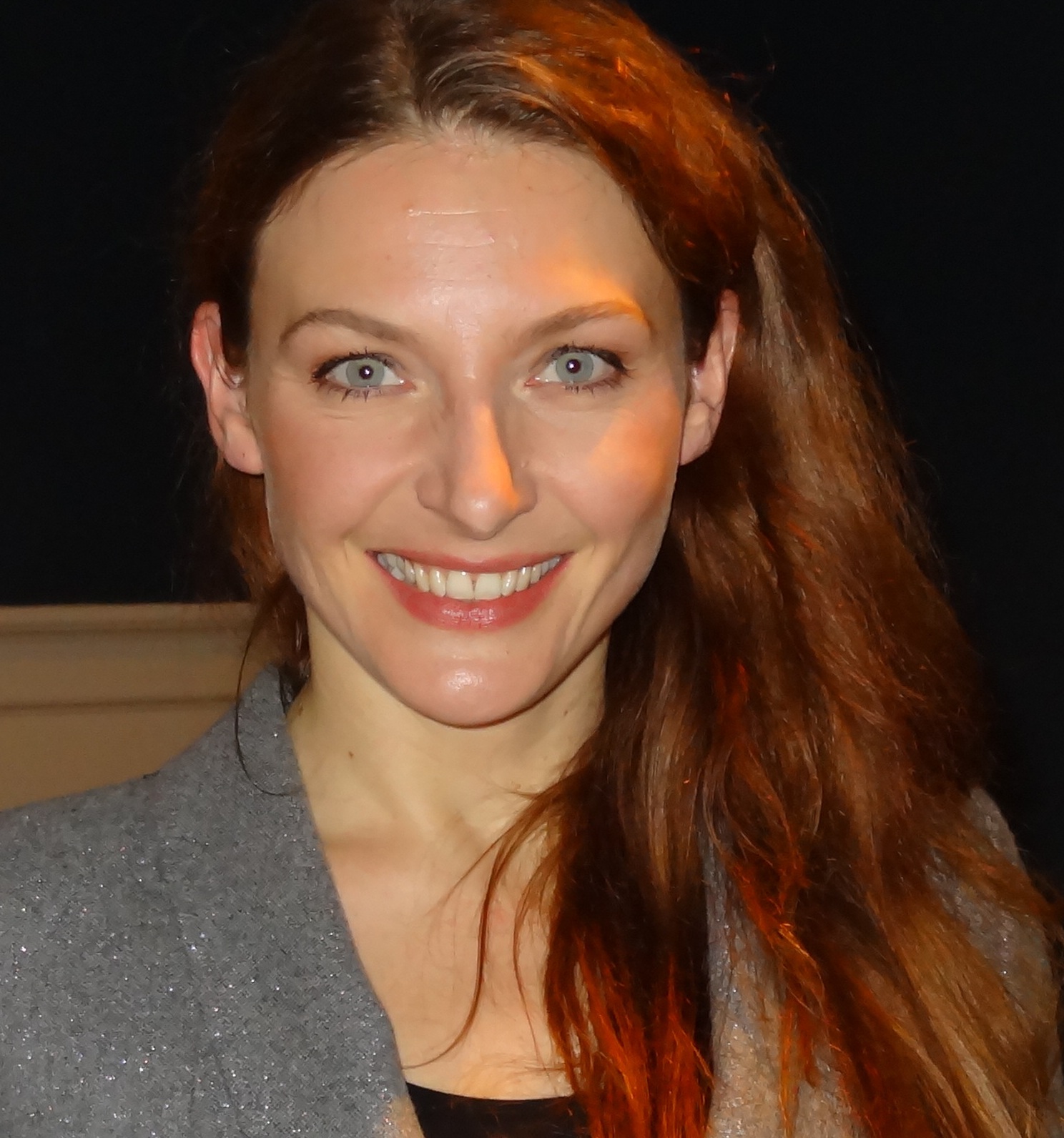
Willemijn Verkaik, 2012

== Notable people born in Son en Breugel ==
- Heymericus de Campo (1395–1460) - philosopher and theologian of the 15th century
- Franciscus Sonnius (1506–1576) - theologian, first Bishop of 's-Hertogenbosch and later first Bishop of Antwerp
- Antoon van de Ven (1867–1934) - farmer and mayor
- Jos van de Ven (1872-1947) - politician and beer brewer
- Wilhelmus van de Ven (1793–1882) - first dean of Tilburg
- Frans van Beeck (1940-2009) - CDA politician
- Menno Oosting (1964–1999) - professional tennis player
- Bart Oomen|nl (1964) - Dutch actor
- Adri Vogels (1941–2022) - soccer player and coach
- Michiel de Vaan (1973) - Dutch linguist and Indo-Europeanist
- Willemijn Verkaik (1975) - Dutch singer and actress

== Gallery ==
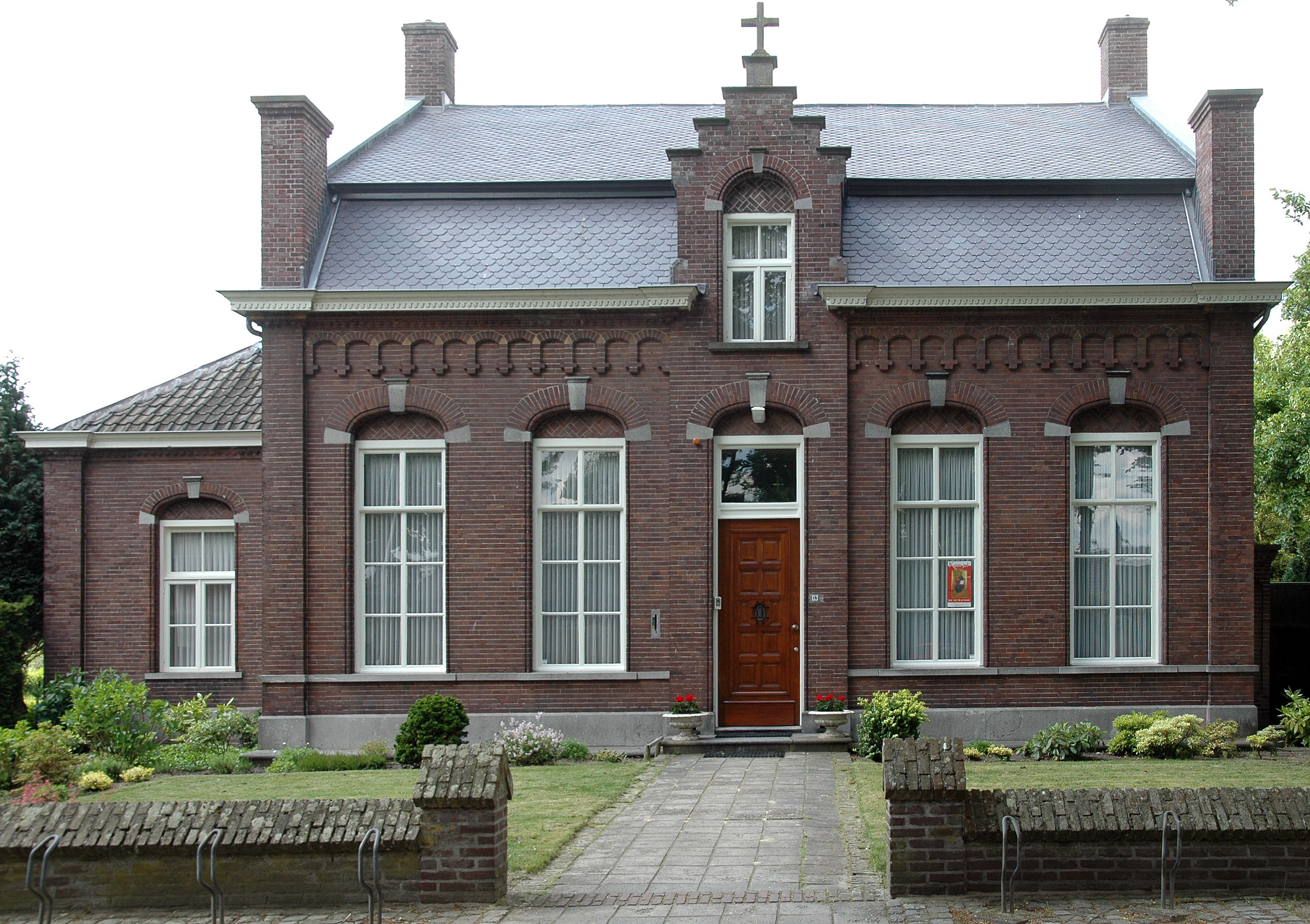
Genovevapastorie-Breugel

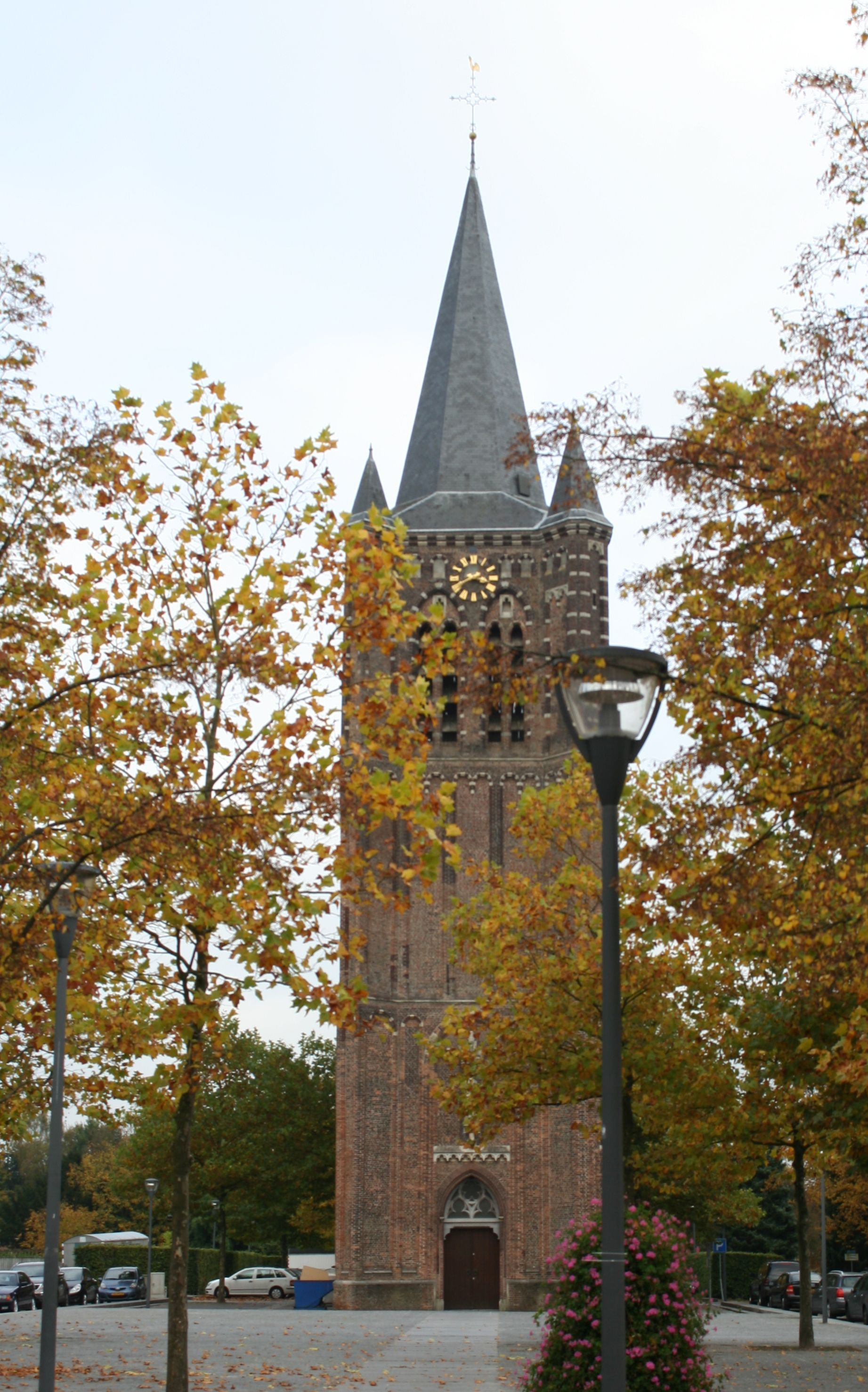
SonenBreugel

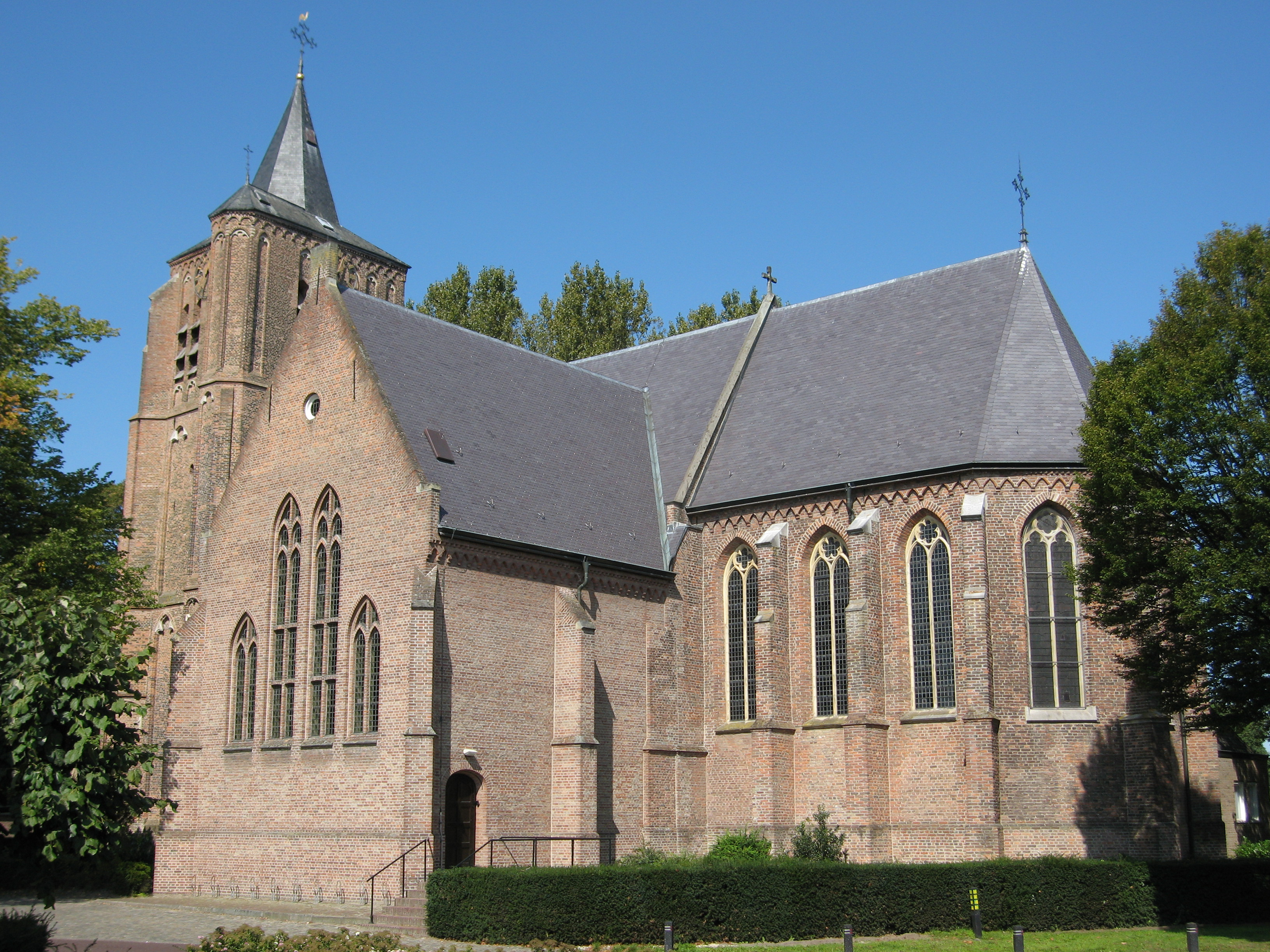
Breugel St. Genoveva Catholic church

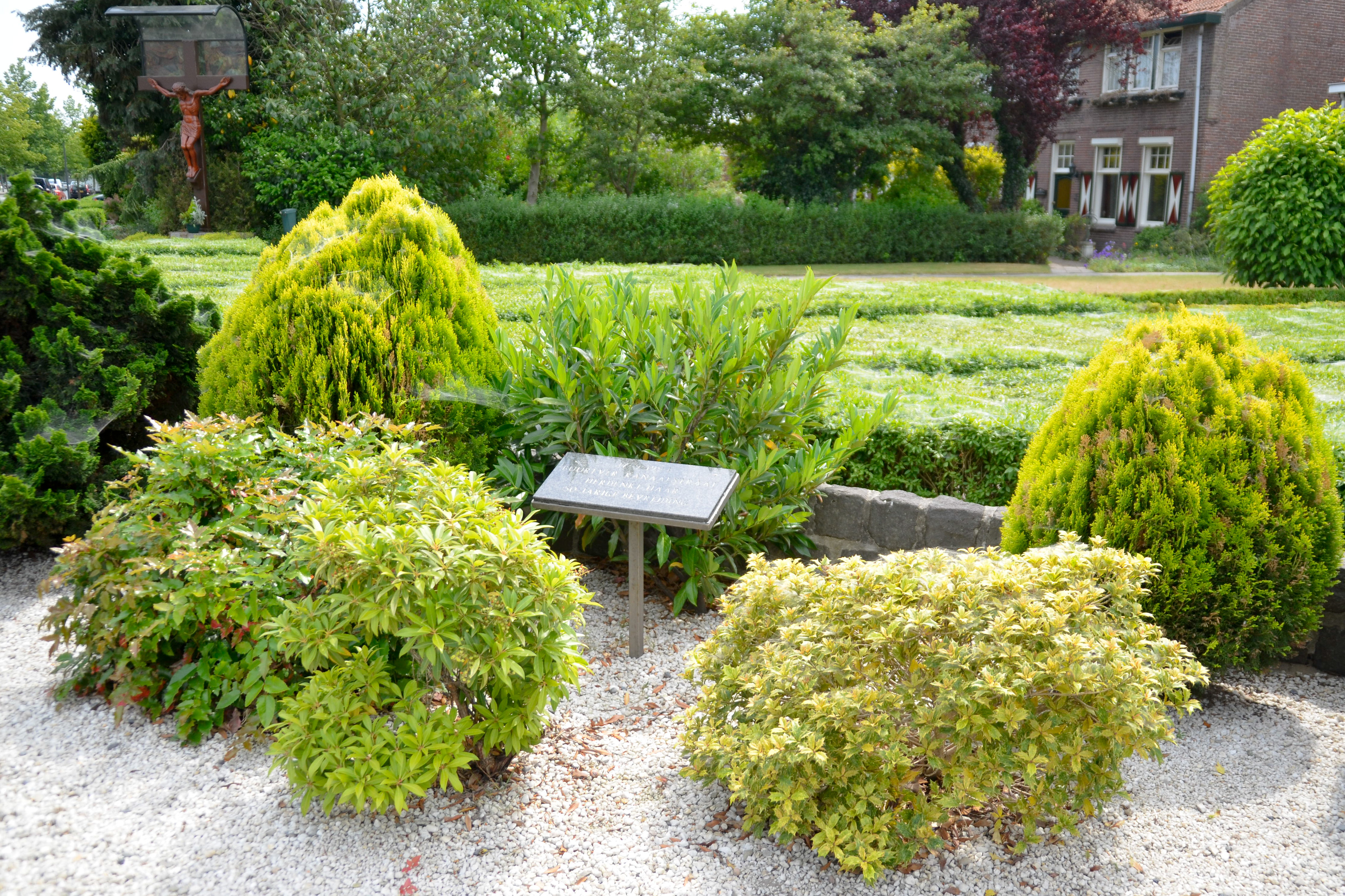
Plaque near Son bridge
