= Major Seminary, Mechelen =

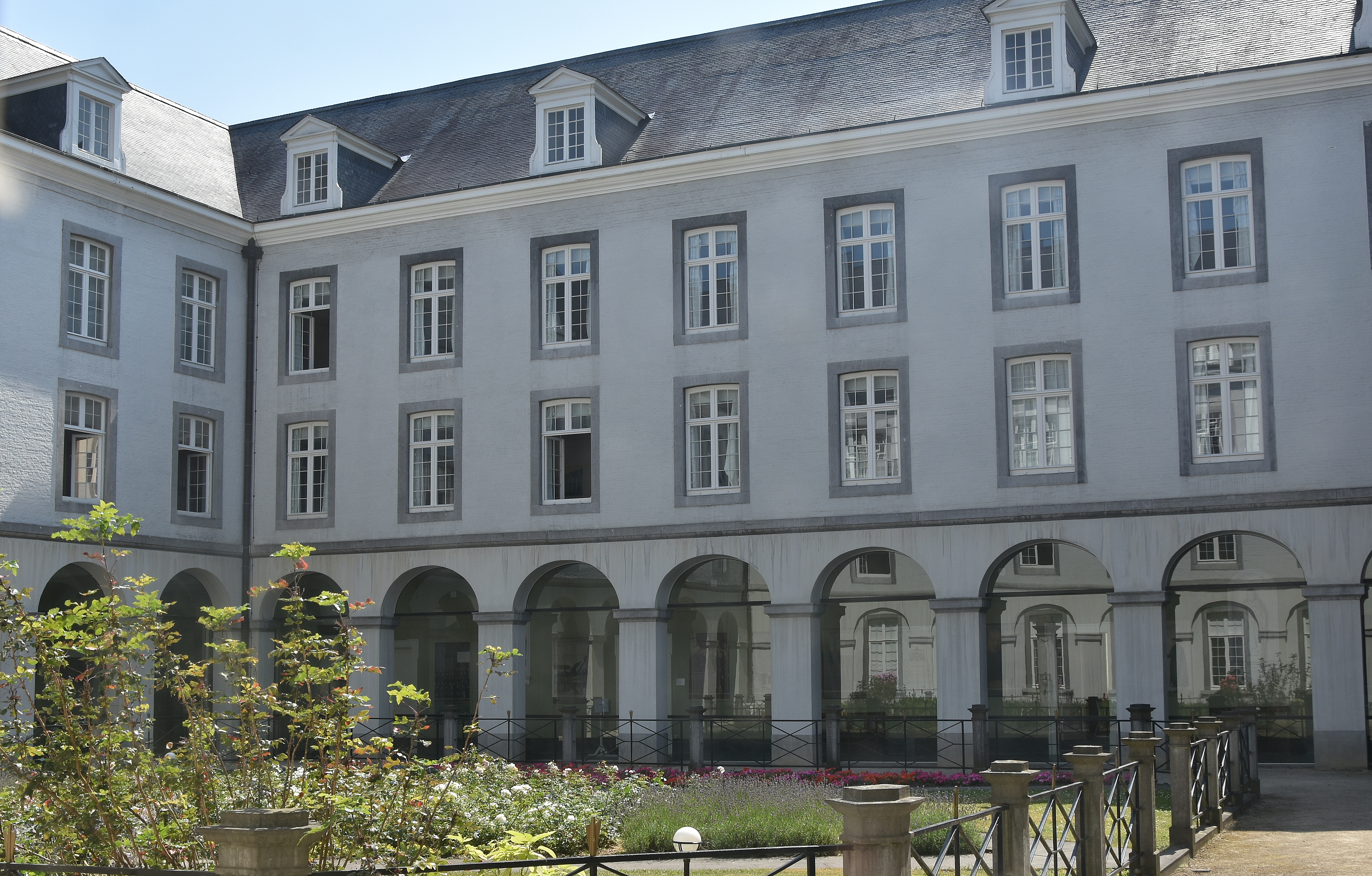
The former Major Seminary in Mechelen, now the Diocesan Pastoral Centre

The Diocesan Pastoral Centre Mechelen is a centre for pastoral activities and ecclestical administration, which also houses the diocesan archive of the Archdiocese of Mechelen-Brussels. It is located on the two-acre (8,861 square metres) site of what was formerly the Major Seminary in Mechelen, an institution for the training of Catholic clergy in the archdiocese from 1595 to 1970. Since 1936, increasingly extensive parts of the site have been listed with the status of a protected monument.

== History ==
Archbishop Mathias Hovius founded the seminary in 1595 in accordance with the 1563 decree on seminaries of the Council of Trent. Earlier attempts to establish a seminary had been prevented by the disturbances of the Dutch Revolt. The seminary was first located in a boarding house founded by Jan Standonck in 1500 for poor youths being educated at the city's Latin School. Candidates for the priesthood were to complete their humanities at the Latin School before receiving theological education at the seminary.

Between 1746 and 1761, Cardinal d'Alsace had a new building erected to house the seminary, with a chapel and four three-floor buildings built around a central courtyard. The new chapel was consecrated on 22 July 1753.

The seminary was closed down by the government of the Austrian Netherlands in 1787, pursuant to a decree of Emperor Joseph II, but reopened in 1789 after the Brabant Revolution. It was again closed down in 1798, during the French period, and in 1799 the buildings were sold. They were rented back by the archdiocese in 1803, after the Concordat of 1801, and bought back in 1806. The government of the United Kingdom of the Netherlands again closed the seminary in 1825, and it was again reopened in September 1830, with a Junior Seminary established for the preparatory courses and the Major Seminary reserved to students of Philosophy and Theology. By the middle of the 19th century, the 18th-century buildings were becoming too small and in the 1840s and 1850s these were extended upwards with an additional floor. New buildings were added in 1887 to house a larger refectory and a large lecture theatre, and in 1900 a new wing was added. By the 1930s, the seminary was again too small, and a new seminary was established in Sint-Katelijne-Waver to provide two years of Philosophy and a first year of Theology before seminarians moved to Mechelen to complete their training in Theology. In 1948 a new wing was added to the seminary in Mechelen and in 1955 a larger chapel was consecrated.

With declining numbers of candidates for the priesthood, Cardinal Suenens closed the seminary in Sint-Katelijne-Waver in 1964, and in 1970 transferred the training of priests for the Archdiocese of Mechelen-Brussels to the John XXIII Seminary, Leuven. The seminary library was transferred to Leuven, forming one of the core collections of the Maurits Sabbe Library of the Faculty of Theology, Catholic University of Leuven. Over the subsequent decades, the former seminary was renovated and transformed into the Diocesan Pastoral Centre.

entrance

chapel
