= Joannes Miraeus =

Fourth bishop of Antwerp

- Bishop of Antwerp
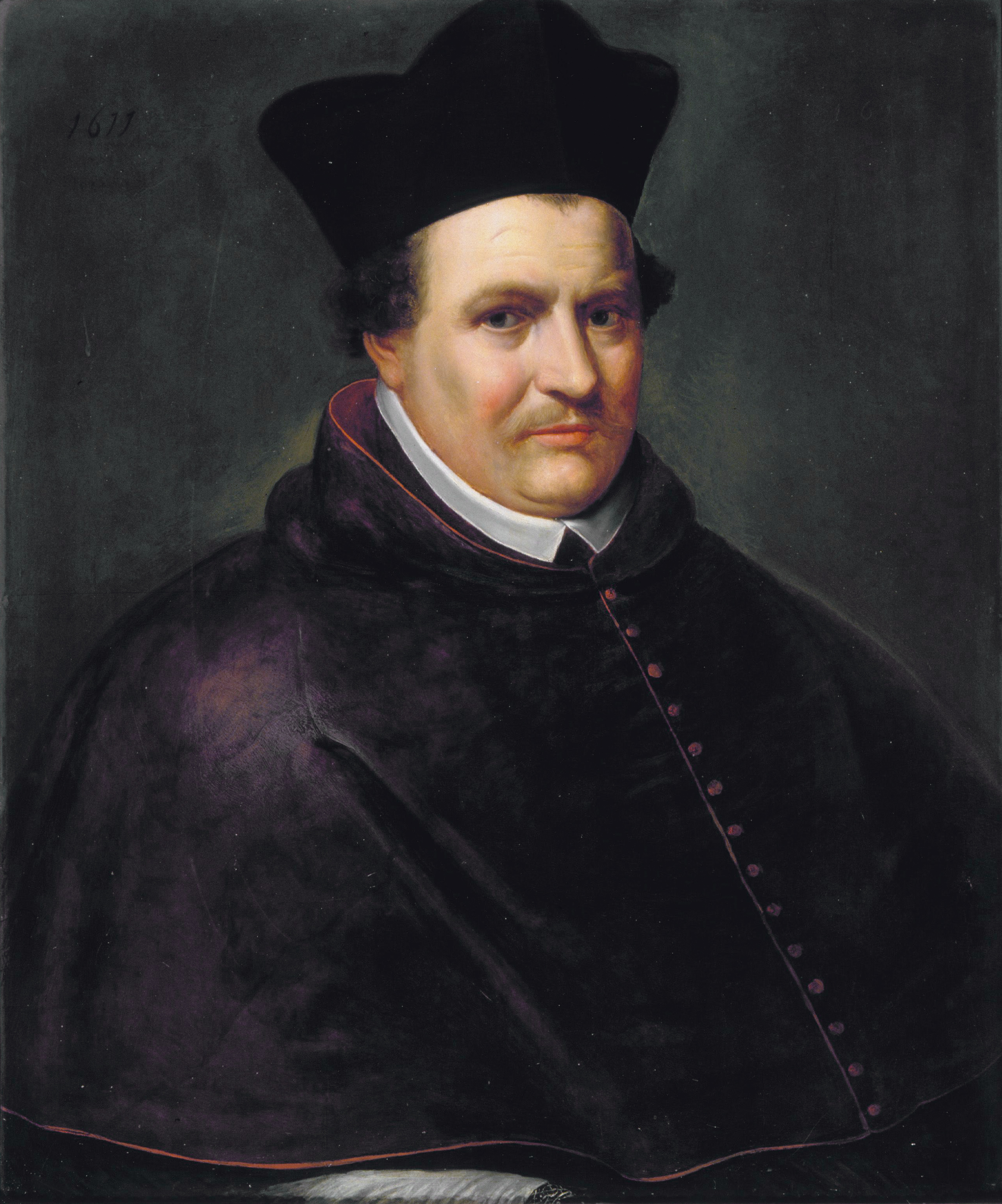
- Portrait by Otto van Veen, 1611
- Church: Catholic
- Diocese: Antwerp
- See: Cathedral of Our Lady (Antwerp)
- Appointed: 26 July 1603
- Term ended: 1611
- Predecessor: Guillaume de Berghes
- Successor: Johannes Malderus
- Previous post: Canon of the Church of St. Gudula

Orders
- Consecration: 30 May 1604

Personal details
- Born: Jean Le Mire; 6 January 1560 Brussels, Duchy of Brabant, Habsburg Netherlands
- Died: 12 January 1611 (aged 51) Brussels, Duchy of Brabant, Habsburg Netherlands
- Education: Philosophy, Theology
- Alma mater: Douai University

Joannes Miraeus, Latinized from Jean Le Mire (1560–1611) was the fourth bishop of Antwerp.

== Life ==
Le Mire was born in Brussels on 6 January 1560. He was educated in the city, and began studies at Louvain University, but due to the unsettled condition of the city during the Dutch Revolt moved to Douai University instead. At Douai he completed his Liberal Arts degree, taught Greek, and in 1588 graduated Licentiate of Sacred Theology. In 1591 he was appointed to the Church of St. James on Coudenberg in Brussels, and not long afterwards became a canon of the Church of St. Michael and St. Gudula (now the cathedral).

On 26 July 1603 he was appointed to the see of Antwerp, and on 30 May 1604 he was consecrated bishop by Mathias Hovius. As bishop he founded a diocesan seminary in Antwerp, and in 1610 called a synod to restore ecclesiastical order in the diocese. He also made efforts to support the Catholic population in the parts of his diocese under the hostile control of the Dutch Republic, and promoted the cult of Our Lady of Scherpenheuvel. He died of an apoplexy in Brussels in the night of 11–12 January 1611, having travelled to the city for the wedding of the Count of Hoogstraten to the daughter of the Count of Berlaimont.

Catholic Church titles
| Preceded by Guillaume de Berghes | Bishop of Antwerp; 1604–1611 | Succeeded by Johannes Malderus |
