= Breugel, Netherlands =

Village in the Netherlands

Breugel
- Village
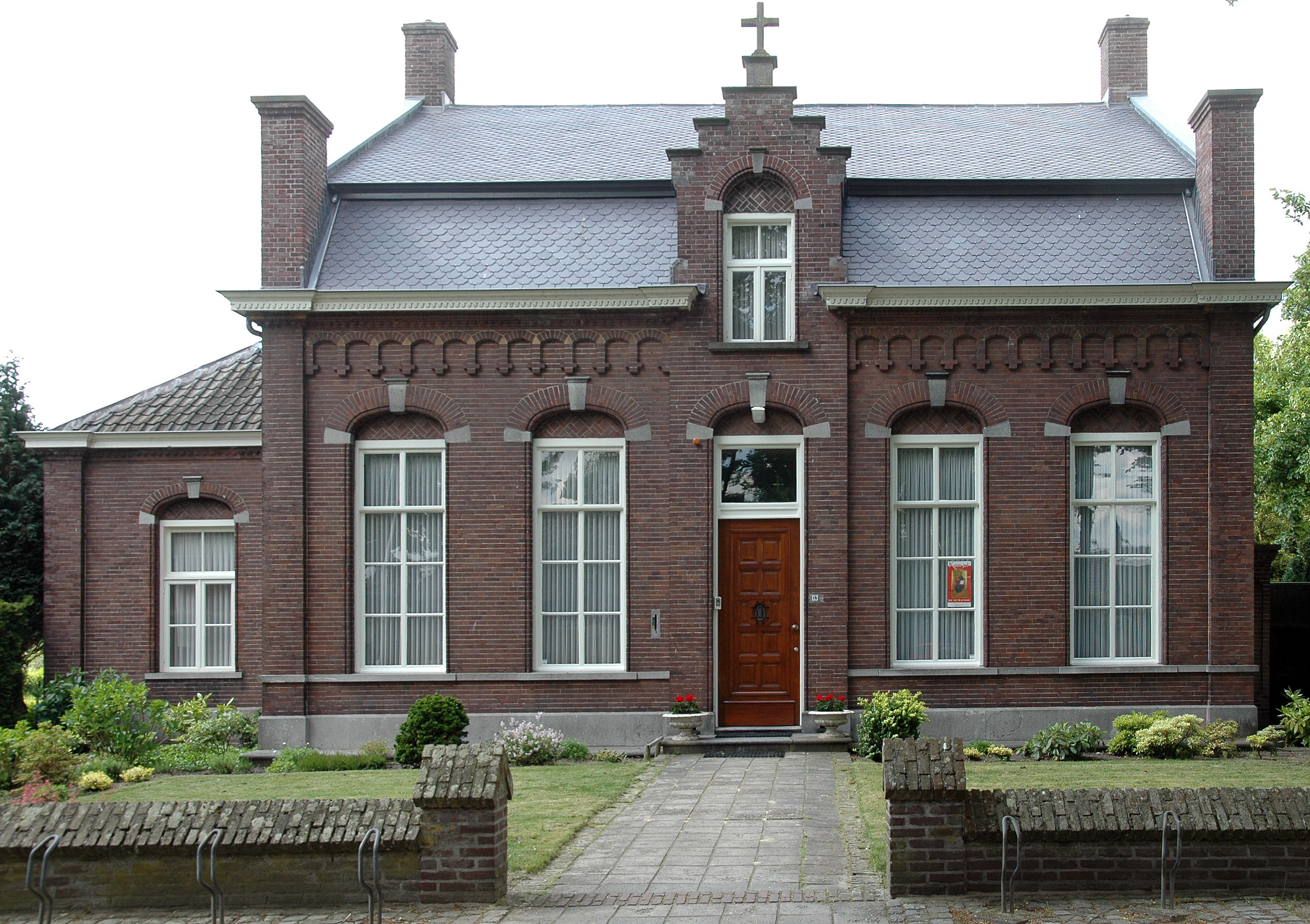
- Clergy house

- Location in the province of North Brabant in the Netherlands Breugel (Netherlands)
- Coordinates: 51°31′N 5°31′E
- Country: Netherlands
- Province: North Brabant
- Municipality: Son en Breugel

Area
  - Total: 6.60 km^{2} (2.55 sq mi)
- Elevation: 14 m (46 ft)

Population (2021)
  - Total: 4,820
  - Density: 730/km^{2} (1,890/sq mi)
- Time zone: UTC+1 (CET)
  - Summer (DST): UTC+2 (CEST)
- Postal code: 5694
- Dialing code: 0499

Breugel is a village in the Dutch province of North Brabant, in the municipality of Son en Breugel.

Breugel lies east of the river Dommel and north of the Wilhelmina Canal.

== History ==
The village was first mentioned in 1288 as Brogele, and means "enclosed area".

The St Genoveva Church dates from the 15th century. It used to have a 25 metres (82 ft) tall tower, that was destroyed in a storm in 1800. In 1821, a much smaller tower was built. It was renovated in 1960 and 1978.

Breugel was home to 335 people in 1840.

== Gallery ==
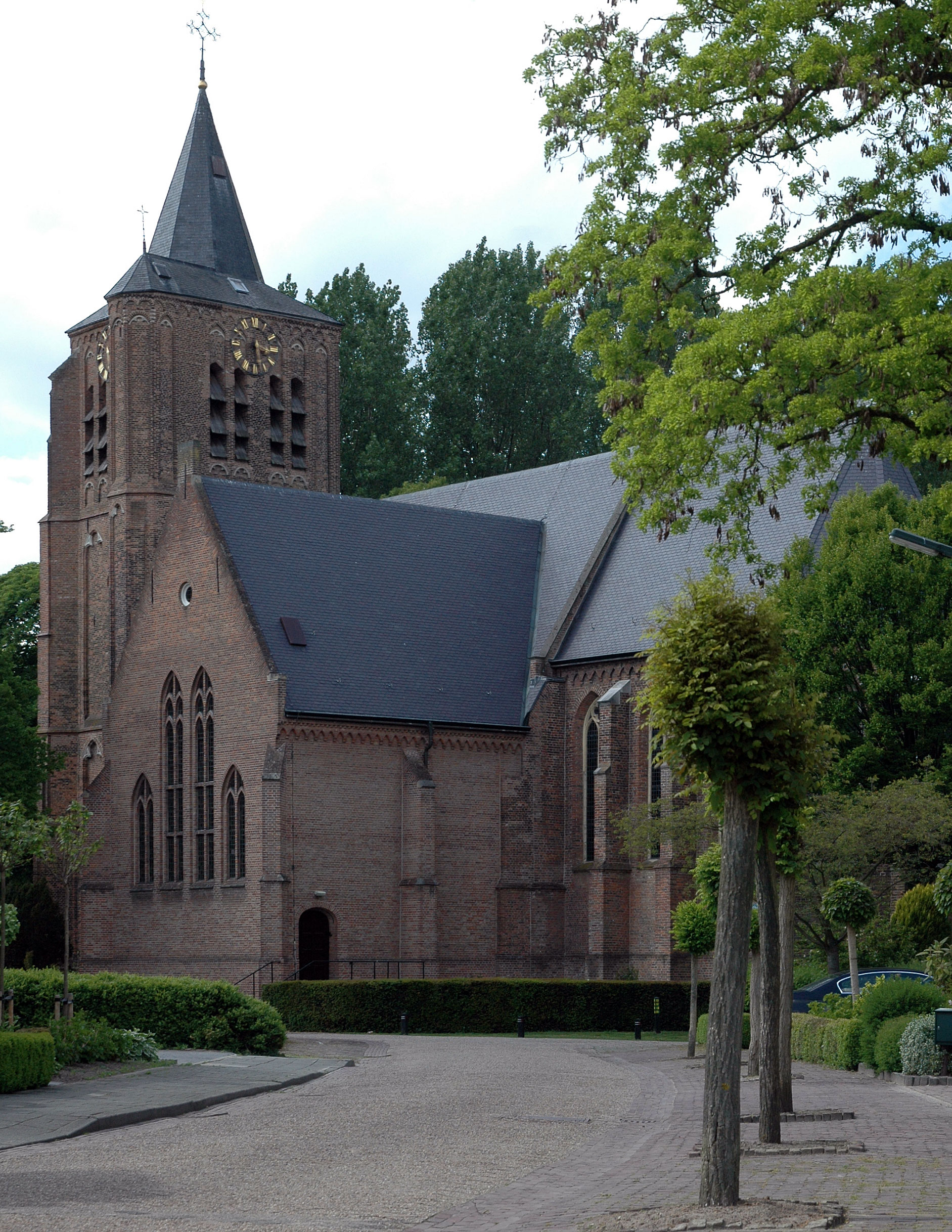
St Genoveva Church

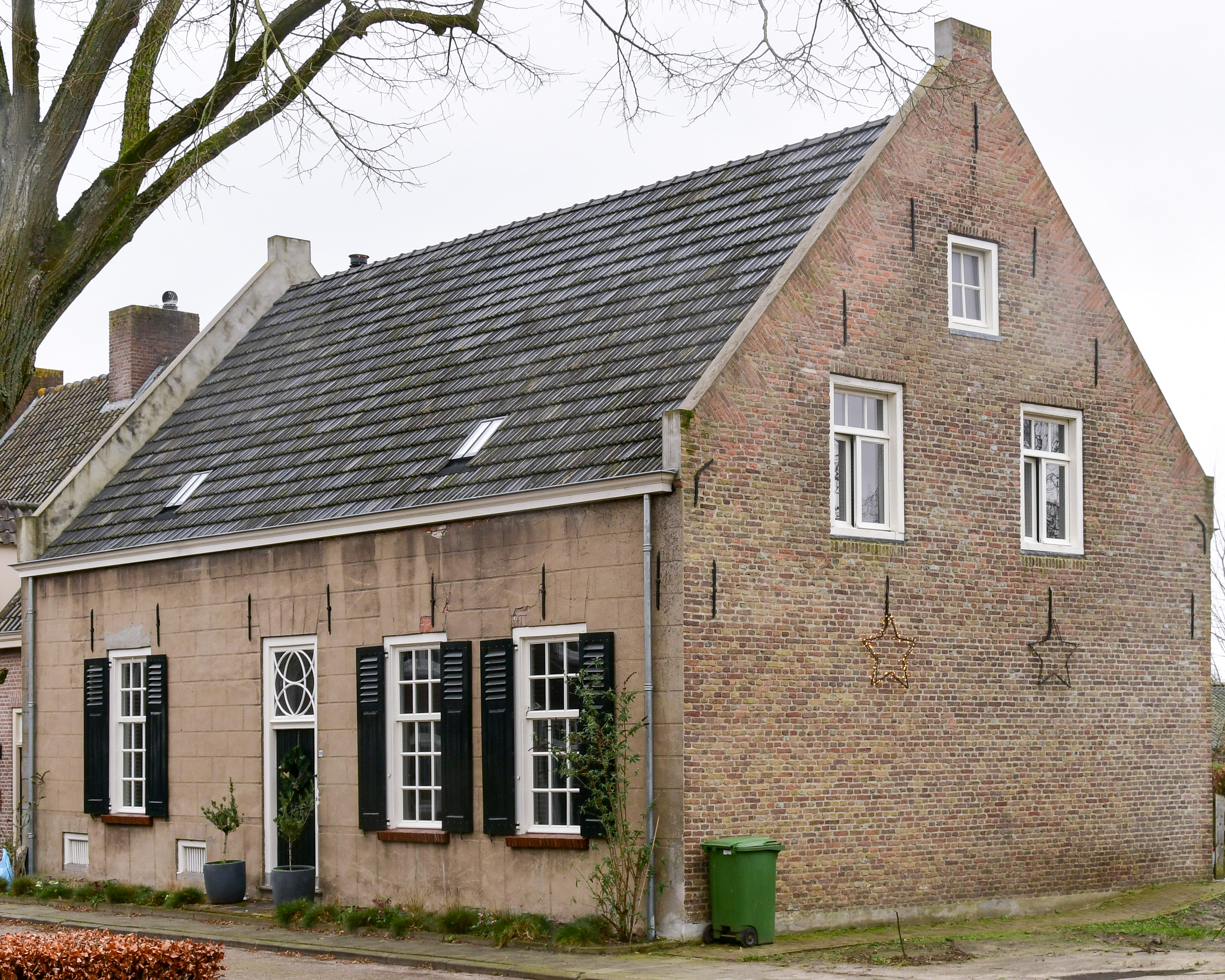
House in Breugel

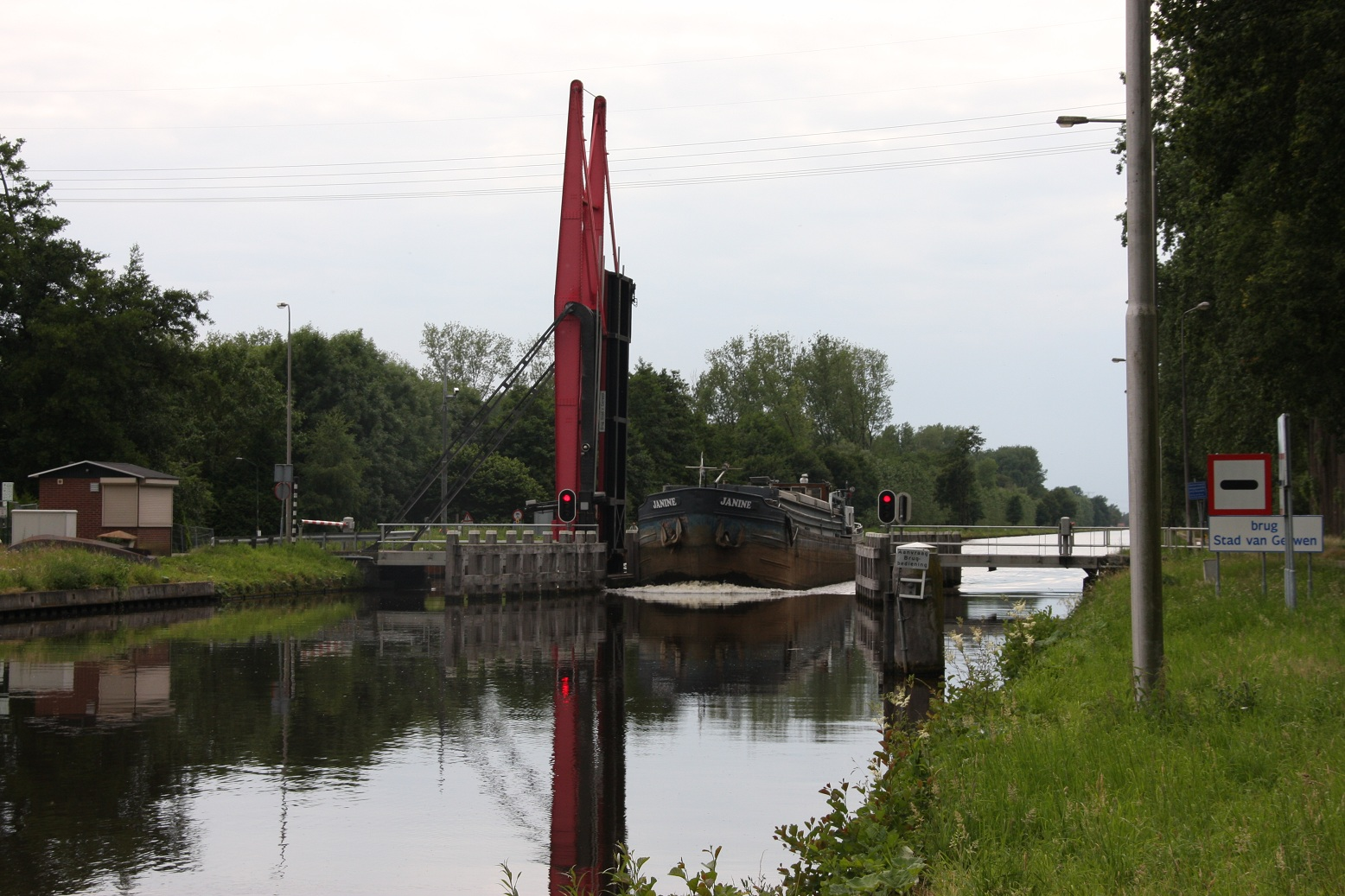
Bridge in Breugel
