= Jacob Thomas Jozef Wellens =

Msgr. Jacob Wellens
- Antwerp
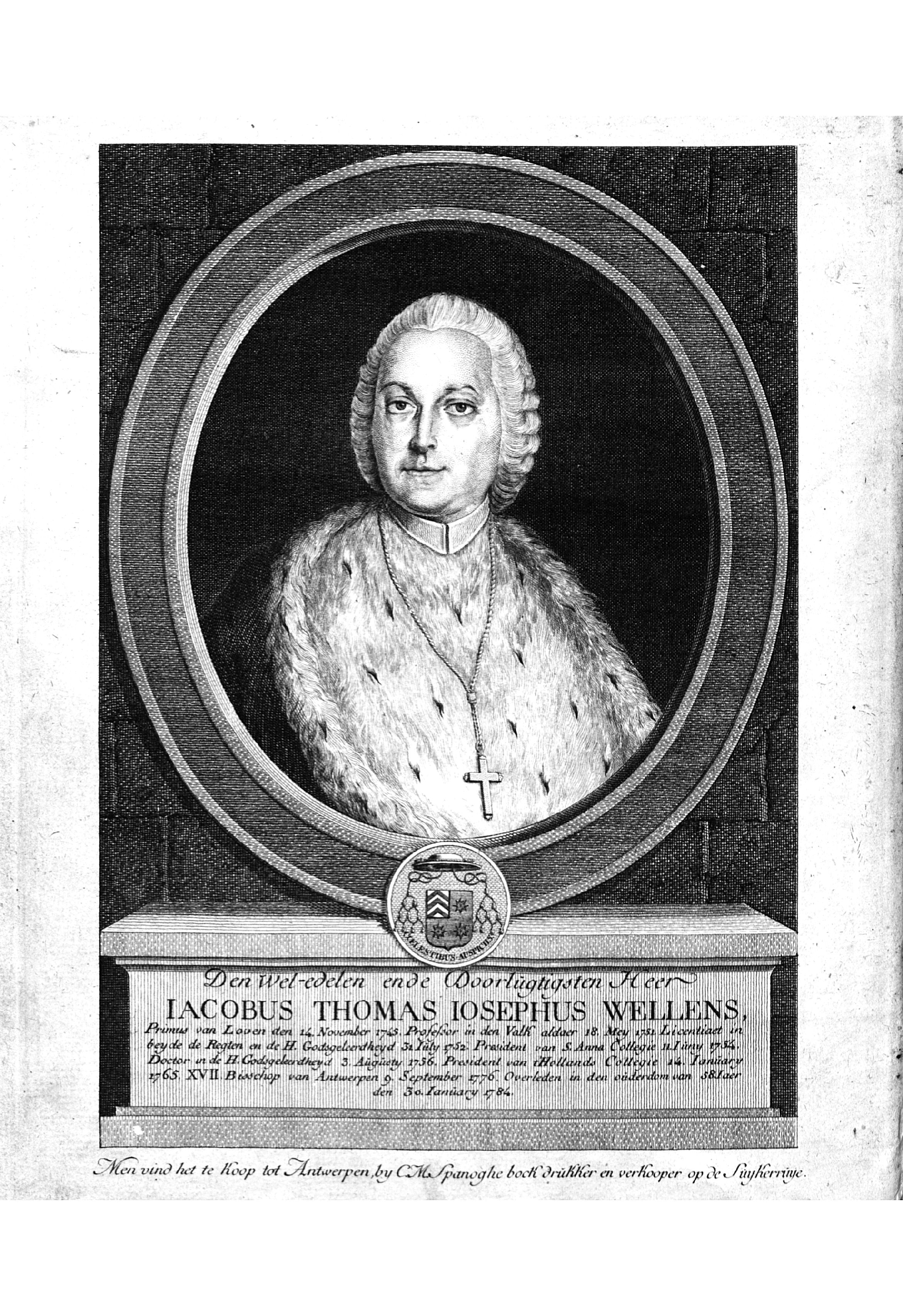
- Portret of J.T.J. Wellens as bishop of Antwerp, published after his death by C.M. Spanoghe
- Province: Belgium
- Diocese: Antwerp
- See: Cathedral of Our Lady (Antwerp)
- Installed: 8 September 1776
- Predecessor: Hendrik Gabriel van Gameren
- Successor: Cornelius Franciscus Nelis

Personal details
- Born: 3 September 1726 Antwerp
- Died: 30 January 1784
- Denomination: Roman Catholic

Jacob Thomas Jozef Wellens (Antwerp, 3 September 1726 - 30 January 1784) was the 17th bishop of Antwerp, Belgium, from 1776 till his death in 1784.

== Biography ==
Wellens was born in Antwerp in 1726. He studied at the Augustinians college in his birth town and at the University college of Leuven, where he became licentiate in both laws (Civil and Canon Law) in 1752 and he obtained a doctorate in theology in 1756. He worked in Leuven and Antwerp in several, mostly religious, offices, until he became bishop of Antwerp in 1776. He was given his mitre at Mechelen on 8 September 1776 and was lauded the next day as the 17th bishop of Antwerp. He passed on 30 January 1784.

== Bibliography ==
After his passing several of his works were published:

- Algemeyne verzaemelinge van de werken van S. Doorl. Hoogw. J. Th. Jos. Wellens, Bisschop van Antwerpen (Antwerp 1884)
- Verzameling van alle de Herderlijke Brieven, Vasten-Bullen, enz., uytgegeven door wylen Zijne Doorl. Hoogw. J.T.J. Wellens, Bisschop van Antwerpen (Antwerp 1784)

== See also ==
- Catholic Church in Belgium
