= Gérard Dominique Azevedo Continho y Bernal =

Gérard Dominique Azevedo Continho y Bernal (1712–1782) was a clergyman, antiquary and genealogist in the Austrian Netherlands.

== Life ==
Born in Mechelen on 4 August 1712, Azevedo Continho y Bernal was educated at the Oratorian College in Mechelen. His parents were Jean-Baptiste Azevedo Continho y Bernal, an infantry captain, and Jeanne-Marie Corten. In 1730, aged 18, was appointed to a canonry of the Basilica of Our Lady of Hanswijk. He was ordained to the priesthood on 24 September 1735. He served as provost of the chapter from 1763 until his death on 22 February 1782.

He was generous to the poor, and a patron of the arts, but particularly dedicated his free time to studying the sources of local history, in particular chronicles, archives and charters.

== Works ==
His own chronicle of Mechelen, Korte Chronyke der stadt ende provincie van Mechelen, was published in Leuven in 26 installments. He was also the author of a short life of St Rumbold, Kort Begryp van ’t leven, lyden en mirakelen van den H. Rumoldus, published in Leuven in 1763.
