= Cornelius Franciscus Nelis =

Belgian bishop

- Bishop of Antwerp
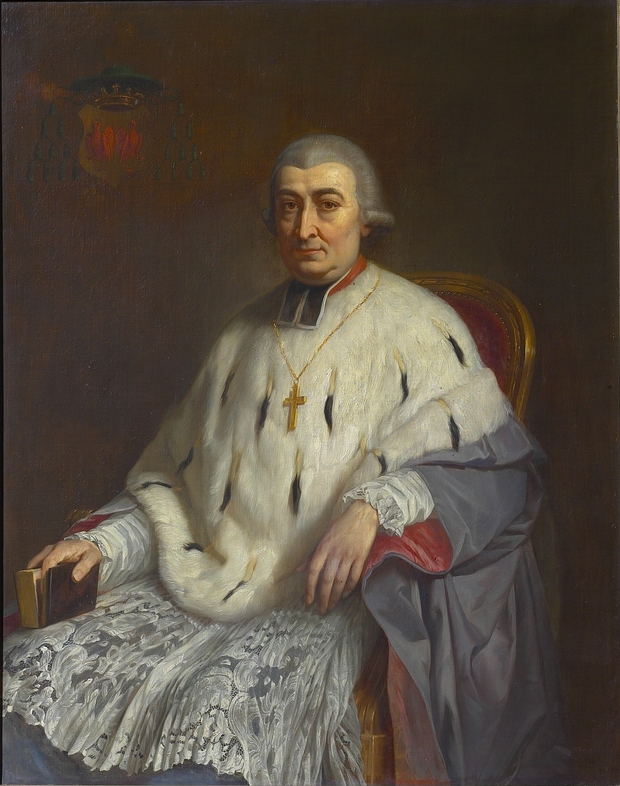
- Church: Roman Catholic
- Diocese: Antwerp
- See: Cathedral of Our Lady (Antwerp)
- Predecessor: Jacob Thomas Jozef Wellens
- Successor: Diocese suppressed until 1961
- Other post: Bishop of Antwerp (1635–1651)

Orders
- Consecration: 5 June 1785

Personal details
- Born: 5 June 1736 Mechelen, Lordship of Mechelen, Austrian Netherlands
- Died: 21 August 1798 (aged 62) Florence, Grand Duchy of Tuscany, Italy
- Education: Theology
- Alma mater: Old University of Leuven

Cornelius Franciscus Nelis (1736—1798) was the last bishop of Antwerp before the suppression of the diocese during the French period.

== Life ==
Nelis was born in Mechelen on 5 June 1736, the son of Cornelis Nelis, advocate of the Great Council of Mechelen. He was educated at the Oratorian College in Mechelen and at the University of Leuven, where he graduated Bachelor of Arts as the first of his year on 27 October 1753. He pursued further studies in theology, graduating Licentiate in Theology on 6 May 1760. In the meantime, he had been appointed director of Leuven University's Mechlin College in 1757 and university librarian in 1758. He played an important role in the creation of Leuven's University Press in 1759.

On 17 July 1765 Nelis was appointed a prebendary of Tournai Cathedral, resigning as university librarian on 26 November 1768 after numerous complaints that he was no longer fulfilling his obligations. In 1777 he was appointed to the Commission Royale des études advising the government on educational reform.

In 1777 Nelis was a candidate for appointment as bishop of Bruges, but was ultimately not chosen for the diocese. He was nominated as bishop of Antwerp on 15 February 1785, his appointment was confirmed by Pope Pius VI on 25 April, and he was consecrated on 5 June. Although initially a supporter of Emperor Joseph II's reform programme, he gradually came under suspicion of inspiring resistance to radical change, and on 26 October 1788 his arrest was ordered and he went into hiding.

After the creation of the United States of Belgium in January 1790, Nelis was appointed president of the States General. He worked hard to maintain agreement between the provinces adhering to the union. After the collapse of the union in December 1790, he eventually came to support the claim of Francis II, Holy Roman Emperor, to rule in the Low Countries.

During the French Revolutionary War in the Low Countries Nelis sought refuge first in the Netherlands and then in Germany, eventually making his way to Italy in 1795. He died at the Camaldolese religious community in Florence on 21 August 1798.

After his death his library was auctioned off in the Low Countries, with many of the items of historical value being bought by Charles van Hulthem, whose collection was an important acquisition of the later Royal Library of Belgium.

== Publications ==
- Fragmens sur les principes du vrai bonheur. Discours de Lysimaque. (Leuven, 1763). Available on KU Leuven Special Collections.
- Alexis, fragment d'instruction d'un prince. Leuven, 1765
- Oratio in funere Francìsci I, imp. Cas. Aug. habita in basilica SS. Michaelis & Gudulæ. Leuven, 1765
- Oraison funèbre de Marie-Thérèse. (Brussels, 1781) Available on on KU Leuven Special Collections
- L'Aveugle de la montagne, entretiens philosophiques. 2 vols, 1789-1793
- Regels ende manieren van leven voor de nonnen en gesuprimeerde persoenen in de wereld.
- Belgicarum rerum prodromus, sive de historia belgica ejusque scriptoribus præcipuis commentario. Antwerp, 1790
- L'aveugle de la montagne (Paris, 1798) Available on on KU Leuven Special Collections
