= Laevinus Torrentius =

Roman Catholic bishop

- Bishop of Antwerp
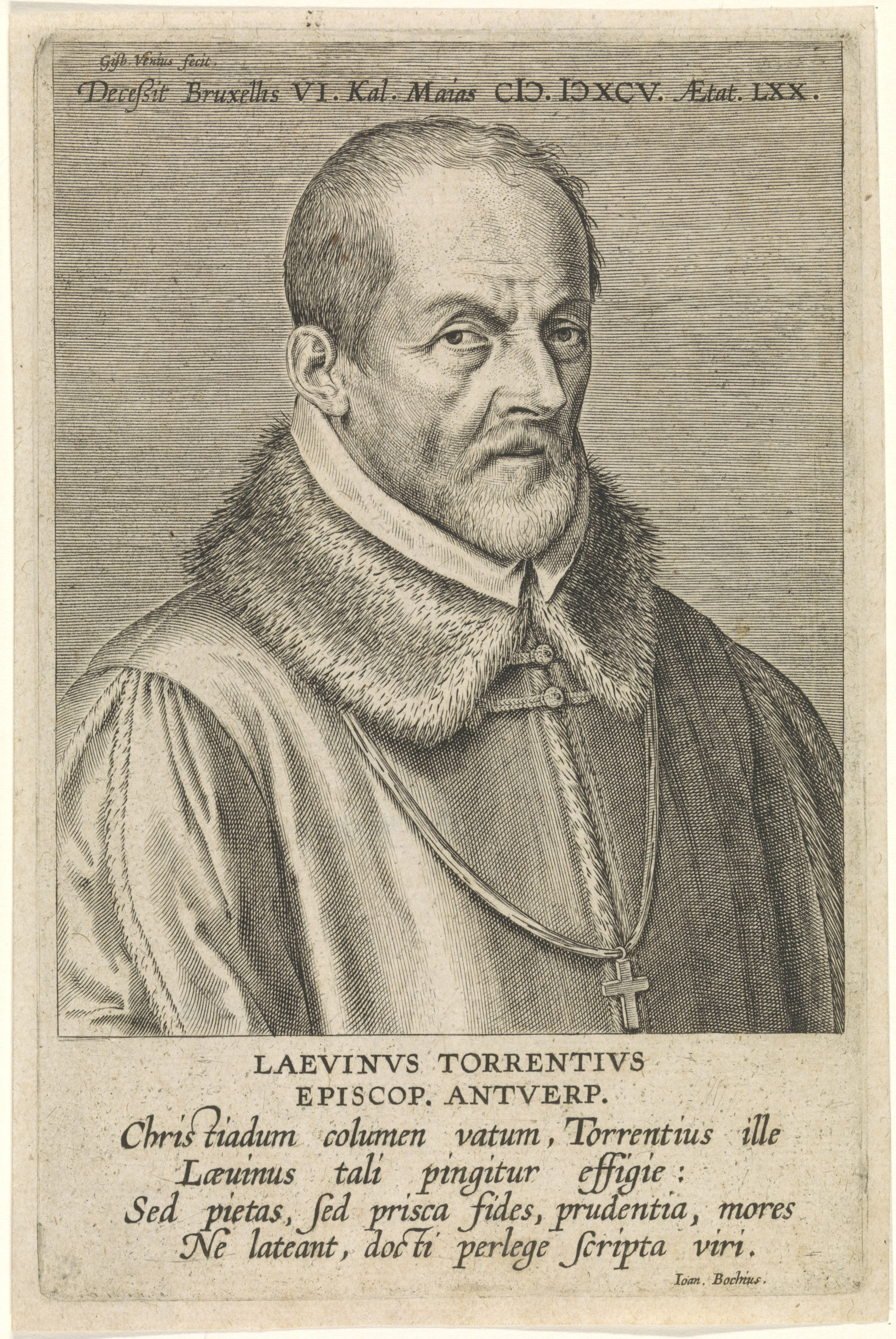
- A portrait of Laevinus Torrentius engraved by Cornelis Galle the Elder after Gijsbert van Veen, with an epigraph by Joannes Bochius
- Church: Catholic
- Diocese: Antwerp
- See: Cathedral of Our Lady (Antwerp)
- Appointed: 1576
- Installed: 1587
- Term ended: 1595
- Predecessor: Franciscus Sonnius
- Successor: Guillaume de Berghes

Personal details
- Born: Lieven van der Beke; 8 March 1525 Ghent
- Died: 26 April 1595 (aged 70) Brussels
- Education: Philosophy, Law
- Alma mater: University of Leuven, University of Bologna

Laevinus Torrentius, born Lieven van der Beke (1525–1595), was the second bishop of Antwerp and one of the leading humanists of his time. He was a Neo-Latin poet, who achieved fame as the editor of Suetonius and Horace. spending many years in Rome in his youth, he developed a serious interest in ancient numismatics. He possessed a large library of about 1,700 books.

== Career ==
He studied philosophy and law at Leuven University and then at the University of Bologna. For five years he lived in Rome. He was appointed Canon of Liege cathedral, and became there vicar general.

He was appointed bishop of Antwerp in 1576 but could not be installed in his see until 1587. He died in 1595, after being nominated to the see of Mechelen but before being appointed.

After his death, he left his library, worth an estimated 30.000 guilders, to the Jesuits of Louvain. He was buried inside Antwerp cathedral.

== Selected works ==
- Torrentius, L. (1572) Poemata sacra. Antverpiae. 1572 edition and expanded 1594 edition on Google Books.
- Torrentius, L. (1578) In C. Suetonii Tranquilli XII Caesares commentarii. Antverpiae: in officina Plantiniana. Expanded 1592 edition on Google Books.
- Torrentius, L. (1608) Commentarii in Horatium. Antverpiae.

Catholic Church titles
Preceded by Franciscus Sonnius	Bishop of Antwerp; 1587–1595	Succeeded by Guillaume de Berghes
