= Johannes Malderus =

- Bishop of Antwerp
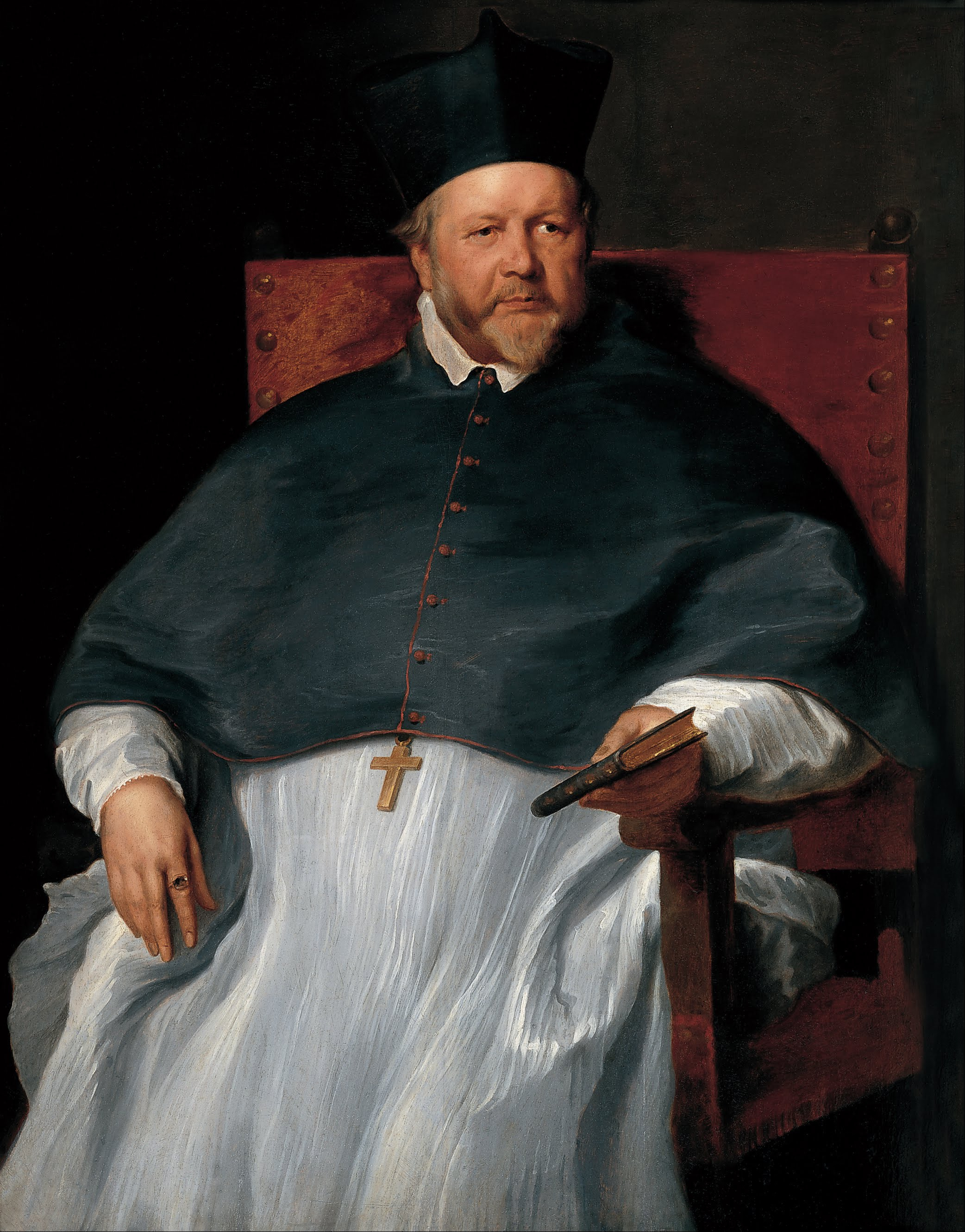
- Portrait of Malderus from the Studio of Anthony van Dyck
- Church: Catholic
- Diocese: Antwerp
- See: Cathedral of Our Lady (Antwerp)
- Appointed: 1611
- Installed: 1611
- Term ended: 1633
- Predecessor: Johannes Miraeus
- Successor: Gaspard Nemius
- Previous posts: regius professor of Scholastic Theology, Leuven University, and president of the Pastoral Seminary, Leuven

Orders
- Consecration: 7 August 1611

Personal details
- Born: Johannes van Malderen; 14 August 1563 Sint-Pieters-Leeuw, Duchy of Brabant, Habsburg Netherlands
- Died: 21 October 1633 (aged 70) Antwerp, Duchy of Brabant, Habsburg Netherlands
- Parents: Roger van Malderen and Elizabeth Walravens
- Education: Philosophy, Theology
- Alma mater: Douai University, Leuven University

Johannes Malderus (1563–1633) was the fifth bishop of Antwerp and the founder of Malderus College at the University of Leuven.

== Life ==
Malderus was born in Sint-Pieters-Leeuw on 14 August 1563, the son of Roger van Malderen and Elizabeth Walravens. His education was overseen by his uncle, Johannes van Malderen, a confidant of Cardinal Granvelle. Malderus studied philosophy at Douai University and theology in Leuven. By 1586 he was teaching philosophy at Pig College, Leuven and on 31 August 1594 he graduated doctor of theology. In 1596 he was appointed regius professor of Scholastic Theology by Philip II of Spain, and in 1598 president of the Pastoral Seminary in Leuven.

On 11 February 1611 he was named bishop of Antwerp. He was consecrated on 7 August 1611 by Mathias Hovius, Archbishop of Mechelen. As bishop he was concerned for the reform of morals in his diocese, as well as with combating Calvinism, especially in those parts of his diocese, such as the deaneries of Breda and Bergen op Zoom, occupied by Dutch forces.

In 1618 he consecrated the new Augustinian church in Antwerp, and in 1621 the new Jesuit church. On 26 July 1633 he made out his last will and testament, the main bequest being the founding of Malderus College in Leuven, to provide housing and scholarship to students of theology. He died in Antwerp on 21 October 1633.

== Publications ==
- Geestelyck onderwys, tot versterking van den crancken in 't geloove (Antwerp, 1613).
- De virtutibus theologicis, et justicia et religione: Commentario ad Secundam Secundae D. Thomae (Antwerp, Plantin Press, 1616). Available on Google Books.
- Modus procedendi in curia ecclesiastica (Antwerp, 1619)
- Anti-synodica, sive Animadversiones in Decreta Conventus Dordraceni, quam vacant Synodum Nationalem, de quinque doctrinae capitibus, inter Remonstrantes et Contraremonstrantes controversis (Antwerp, Plantin Press, 1620). Available on Google Books.
- In primam secundae D. Thomae commentaria: de fine et beatitudine hominis; de virtutibus, vitiis et peccatis; de legibus; de gracia; de justificatione; de meritis (Antwerp, Plantin Press, 1623). Available on Google Books.
- Tractatus de restrictionum mentalium abusu (Antwerp, Plantin Press, 1625). Available on Google Books.
- Tractatus de sigillo confessionis sacramentalis (Antwerp, Plantin Press, 1626). Available on Google Books.
- In Canticum Canticorum Salomonis commentarius (Antwerp, Plantin Press, 1628). Available on Google Books. Another later version of Brevis Commentarius in Canticum Canticorum, to which is added a small treatise on a spiritual exercise by R.P. Joannes Evangelista, along with an assessment of such exercises by Joannes Malderus, including notes, can be consulted online via the KU Leuven Special Collections (1652).
- Meditationes theologices, universes theologies summam complectentes, tribus partibus distinctæ, et in 21 dies distributae (Antwerp, 1630)
- In primam partem D. Thomae Commentarla, de Sancta Trinitate, creatione in genere, et Angelis (Antwerp, Plantin Press, 1634). Available on Google Books.

Catholic Church titles
Preceded by Johannes Miraeus	Bishop of Antwerp; 1611–1633	Succeeded by Gaspard Nemius
