= Jan van Gemert =

Dutch painter

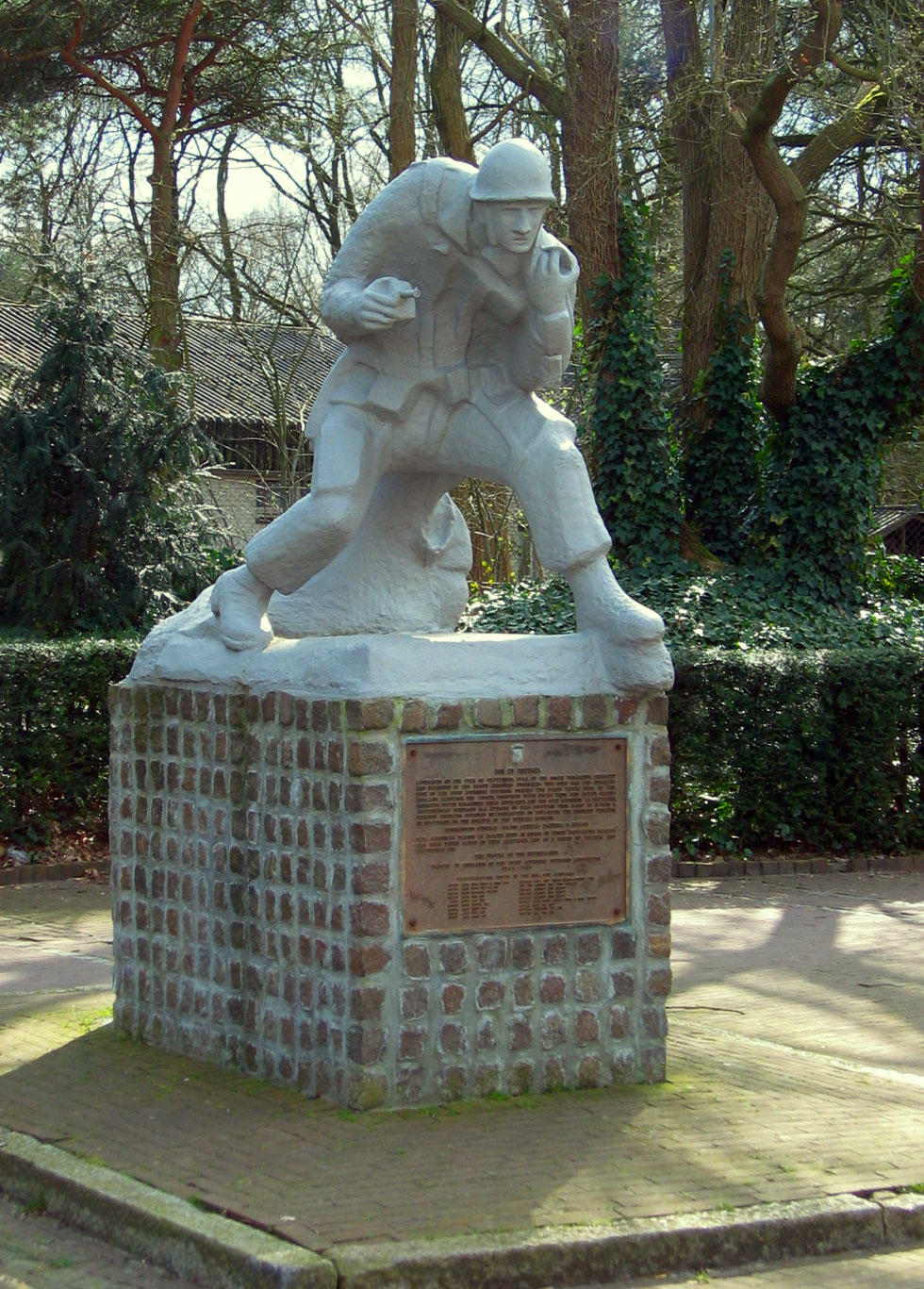
Son Airborne monument.

Albertus Johannes (Jan) van Gemert (3 June 1921, in Gemert – 11 September 1991, Gemert) was a Dutch painter, graphic artist, sculptor, glass artist, and ceramist.

== Life ==
Jan van Gemert was born in Gemert, the third of twelve children. His father was Marinus van Gemert (1894–1978), an ex-sergeant and worker in the textile industry. His mother, Dora Gruijters (1894–1982), originated from a gardening family. At the age of 13, Jan becomes involved in an accident, and he was missing a leg. Three years later, he enrolled in the management program of the Catholic Workers Union in Helmond, where he graduated in 1940.

That same year, he fled the Arbeidseinsatz and found refuge in the home of the Dutch painter and ceramic artist Willi Martinali in Deurne. During the war, he received drawing lessons from the portraitist Jacques Stroucken. He married Anna Maria van den Broek (1921–1994) in Helmond, with whom he had three children: Petra, Gregor, and Theo. After the war, he returned to Gemert and had various jobs, including as a house servant, textile worker, clerk and assistant cooks. He also receives assignments together with Willi Martinali to teach courses "Free Expression" to schools and community centers.

In 1952, he built his own studio with assistance of the mayor of Gemert De Bekker. In 1954, he completed his training at the Design Academy Eindhoven, where he was educated by Jan Gregoor and Jacques van Rijn. He became a member of the General Catholic Artists Association and the Eindhoven club Cultural Contact, which was under the leadership of Jan Henselmans Louis Friday and French Babylon. In 1956, together with Jan Kuhr, Jean Nies, and Piet van Hemme he founded the arts center "De Vrije Expressieven," which however would be short-lived. In 1959, he was appointed lecturer at the Secondary Technical School in Eindhoven, and shortly after he joined the Social Academy Eindhoven, where he would teach until 1975. From the mid-seventies, Jan van Gemert had a relation with textile artist Rick Boesewinkel (1931-1993), whom he married a few years before his death.

== Work ==
In his mostly expressionist work Jan van Gemert is related to, among others Edgar Tijtgat, Herman Kruyder and other "Brabant expressionists" as Hendrik Wiegersma and Jan van Eyck. His favorite medium was oil on hardboard, canvas or paper, but he also used crayons, glue, paint and Siberian chalk. Sculpture, mosaics and reliefs in fire clay and terracotta by Jan van Gemert appeared in Gemert, 's-Hertogenbosch, Uden, Weert, Son (Liberation Monument, see image), Elsendorp (in front of the St. Christopher Church), Made, Drimmelen (Resistance monument), Wanroij, Bakel and Odiliapeel.

His work is in public collections of the Kempenland Museum in Eindhoven. and the Museum De Wieger in Deurne.

== See also ==
- List of Dutch ceramists
