= Paul Van den Berghe =

Belgian Catholic prelate (born 1933)

- Bishop of Antwerp
- In office: 3 July 1980 - 2008
- Successor: Johan Bonny

Orders
- Ordination: 15 June 1957
- Consecration: 7 September 1980

Personal details
- Born: 7 January 1933 (age 93) Geraardsbergen, Belgium
- Denomination: Roman Catholic
- Motto: Libertati liberavit nos
- Coat of arms

Paul Van den Berghe (born 7 January 1933) is a Belgian Catholic retired prelate who served as Bishop of Antwerp from 1980 to 2008

== Biography ==
Van den Berghe obtained a degree in Thomist philosophy and was ordained a priest on 15 June 1957. He then earned a doctorate in theology in 1961 and became professor of exegesis at a seminary in Ghent, where he was one of the founders was the Hoger Instituut voor Godsdienstwetenschappen. He served as the editorial secretary of Collationes, a Flemish magazine of pastoral theology, and wrote numerous articles on the exegesis of the New Testament.

On 3 July 1980 he was appointed the 21st Bishop of Antwerp by Pope John Paul II (the third bishop of the re-established Diocese of Antwerp) and consecrated on 7 September 1980. His motto, chosen from a verse in the book of Galatians is: "Libertati liberavit nos" (For the freedom he set us free). In the Belgian bishops' conference he was responsible for the Interdiocesaan Pastoraal Beraad (Inter-Diocesan Pastoral Board).

In 2008, he had reached the mandatory retirement age of 75 and on 28 October 2008 he was succeeded by Bishop Johan Bonny.
