= Diocese of Antwerp =

Catholic ecclesiastical territory in Belgium

Diocese of Antwerp Dioecesis Antverpiensis Bisdom Antwerpen (Dutch) Diocèse d'Anvers (French) Bistum von Antwerpen (German)

Catholic
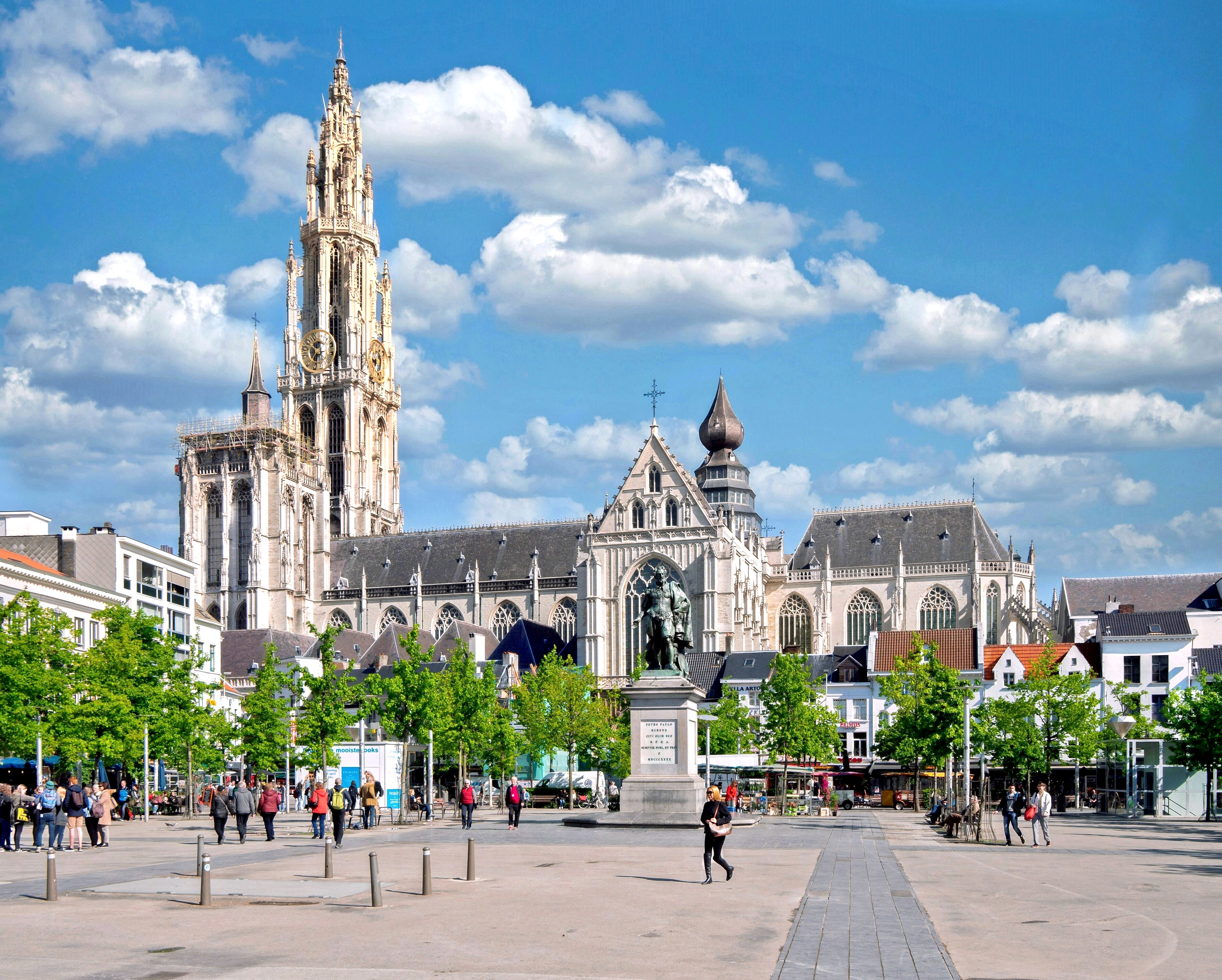
- Cathedral of Our Lady in Antwerp

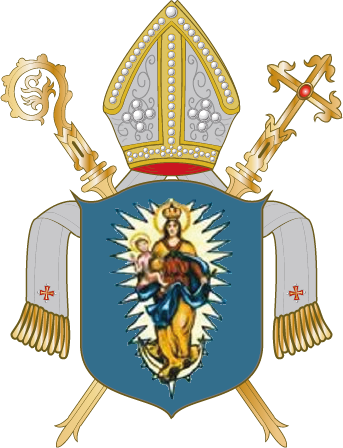
- Coat of arms

Location
- Country: Belgium
- Ecclesiastical province: Mechelen-Brussels
- Metropolitan: Archdiocese of Mechelen-Brussels
- Coordinates: 51°13′06″N 4°24′10″E

Statistics
- Area: 2,570 km^{2} (990 sq mi)
- Population: Total; Catholics: (as of 2020); 1,586,590; 1,215,000 (76.6%)

Information
- Denomination: Catholic Church
- Sui iuris church: Latin Church
- Rite: Roman Rite
- Established: 8 December 1961
- Cathedral: Cathedral of Our Lady in Antwerp
- Patron saint: Ignatius of Loyola

Current leadership
- Pope: Leo XIV
- Bishop: Johan Bonny
- Metropolitan Archbishop: Luc Terlinden
- Bishops emeritus: Paul Van den Berghe

Map
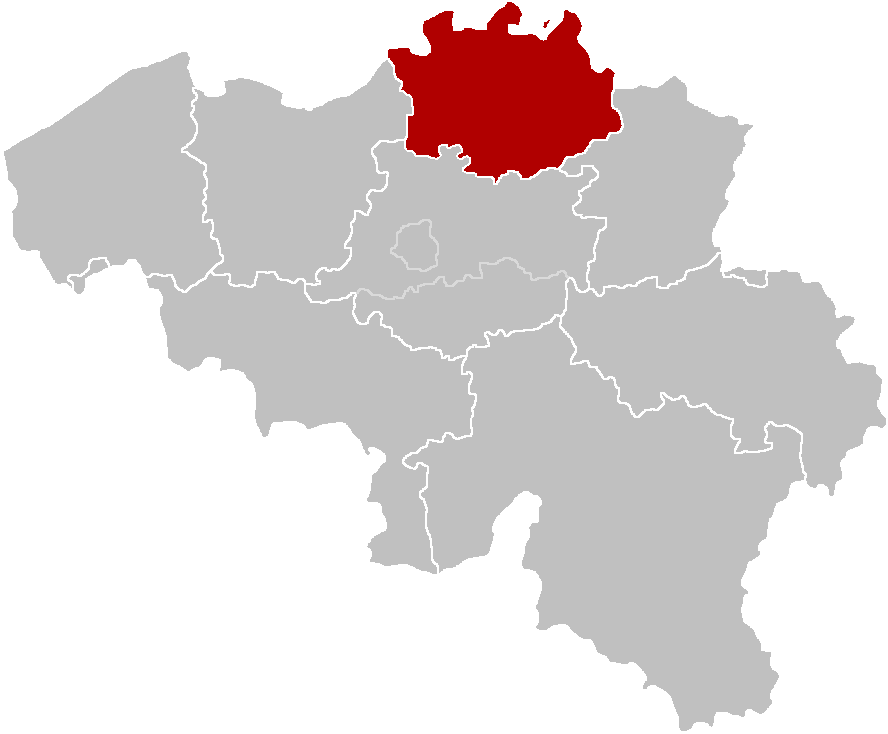
- The territorial extent of the diocese of Antwerp. Note that it is smaller than the Province of Antwerp

The Diocese of Antwerp (Latin: Dioecesis Antverpiensis) is a Latin Church ecclesiastical territory or diocese of the Catholic Church in Belgium. The diocese was restored in 1961. It is a suffragan in the ecclesiastical province of the metropolitan Archdiocese of Mechelen-Brussels. Its cathedra is found within the Cathedral of Our Lady.

== History ==
In the Middle Ages, Antwerp was within the Diocese of Cambrai. In 1559, at the instance of Philip II of Spain, a new arrangement of the episcopal sees of the Low countries was made by Pope Paul IV. Three archiepiscopal and fourteen episcopal sees were created, and all external jurisdiction, however ancient, abolished. Antwerp became one of the six suffragans of Mechlin, and remained such until the end of the eighteenth century.

This step did not meet with the goodwill of the merchants of the city, who feared the introduction of the Inquisition and the costliness of an episcopal establishment, and urged the transfer of the new see to Leuven, where it would be less offensive to the non-Catholic elements of their city. Catholic monastic interests were active, being now called on by the Pope to provide for the support of the new see. Finally, the famous theologian Franciscus Sonnius (from Son in Brabant) was transferred from the diocese of Bois-le-Duc to Antwerp in 1569 as first bishop of the new see, and governed it until his death in 1576.

Ten years of religious and political conflict elapsed before another bishop could be appointed in the person of Laevinus Torrentius (Lieven van der Beken or Liévin van der Beken), a Leuven theologian, graceful humanist, and diplomat. He died in 1595. The scholarly Joannes Miraeus (or Le Mire) was Bishop of Antwerp from 1604 to 1611, and was succeeded in the seventeenth and eighteenth centuries by a series of fifteen bishops, the last of whom was Cornelius Franciscus Nelis, librarian of the University of Leuven and Bishop of Antwerp from 1785 to his death in 1798.

In accordance with the Concordat of 1801, Pope Pius VII suppressed the see on 29 November 1801, by the Bull Qui Christi Domini vices, its former Belgian territory transferred to the Archdiocese of Mechlin, the Dutch portion to the Diocese of Breda. The diocese was restored in 1961 by Pope John XXIII. It comprises the territory of the Belgian province of Antwerp, minus eight municipalities in the south which belong to Mechelen-Brussels including Bonheiden, Duffel, Mechelen and Sint-Katelijne-Waver.

The abbeys and convents of Antwerp were long very famous centres of its religious life. In the twelfth century the Canons Regular of St. Norbert (Premonstratensians) founded the abbey of St. Michael, that would become one of the principal abbeys of the Low Countries, sheltered many royal guests, and eventually excited greed and persecution by reason of its wealth. The Cathedral of Antwerp was originally a small Premonstratensian shrine known familiarly as "Our Lady of the Stump." Many other religious orders found a shelter in Antwerp, Dominicans, Franciscans (1446), Carmelites (1494), Carthusians (1632), and female branches of the same. The Cistercians had two great abbeys, St. Sauveur, founded in 1451 by the devout merchant Peter Pot, and St. Bernard, about six miles from Antwerp, founded in 1233.

== List of bishops ==
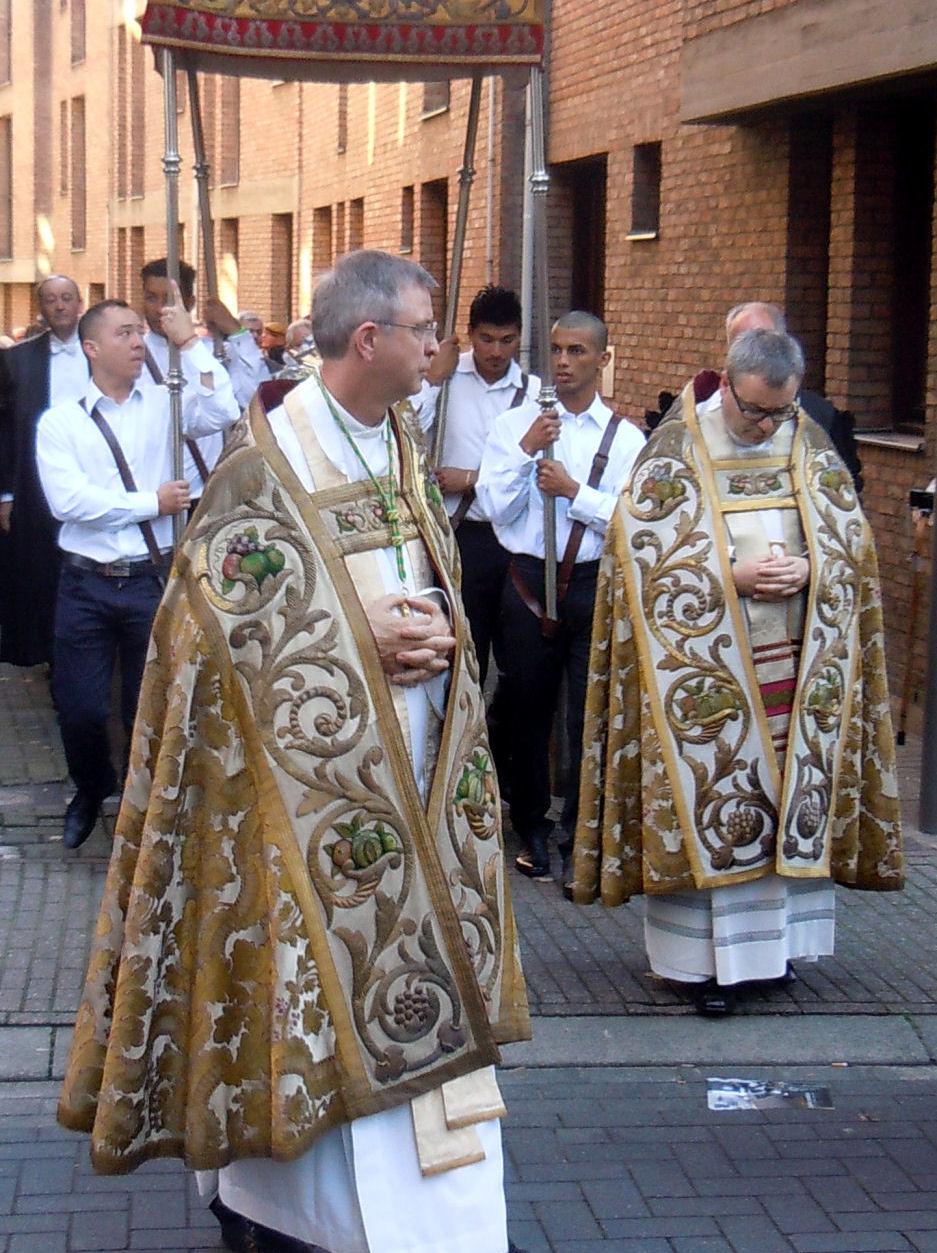
Johan Bonny, current bishop of Antwerp

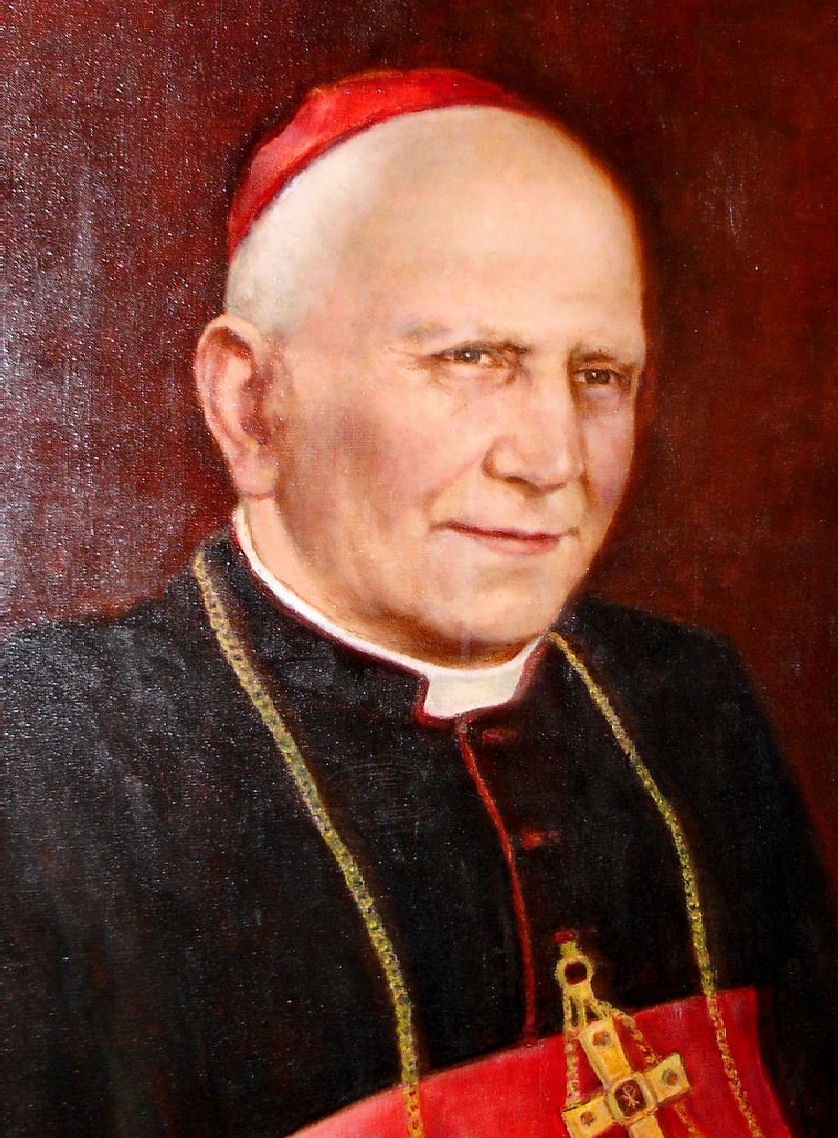
Jules Victor Daem, bishop of Antwerp from 1962 to 1977

=== 1559–1798 ===
- 1559–1568: vacant
- 1569–1576: Franciscus Sonnius (Frans van der Velde)
- 1576–1586: vacant
- 1586–1595: Laevinus Torrentius (Liévin van der Beken)
- 1597–1601: Guillaume de Berghes
- 1603–1611: Johannes Miraeus (Le Mire)
- 1611–1633: Johannes Malderus (Jan van Malderen)
- 1634–1651: Gaspard Nemius (Gaspard Van Den Bosch)
- 1652–1676: Ambrosius (or Marius) Capello
- 1677–1678: Aubertus van den Eede
- 1679–1699: Joannes Ferdinandus Van Beughem
- 1700–1706: Reginaldus Cools
- 1707–1727: Peter Josef de Francken-Sierstorff
- 1727–1742: Carolus d'Espinoza
- 1742–1744: Guilielmus Philippus de Herzelles
- 1746–1746: Josephus Werbrouck
- 1749–1758: Dominicus de Gentis
- 1758–1775: Hendrik Gabriel van Gameren
- 1776–1784: Jacob Thomas Jozef Wellens
- 1785–1798: Cornelius Franciscus Nelis

=== 1961–current ===
- 1962–1977: Jules Victor Daem
- 1977–1980: Godfried Danneels
- 1980–2009: Paul Van den Berghe
- 2009–current: Johan Bonny

== See also ==
- List of Roman Catholic dioceses in Belgium
- List of Catholic churches in Belgium
