= Guillaume de Berghes =

Guillaume de Berghes (of Glymes)
- Archbishop of Cambrai
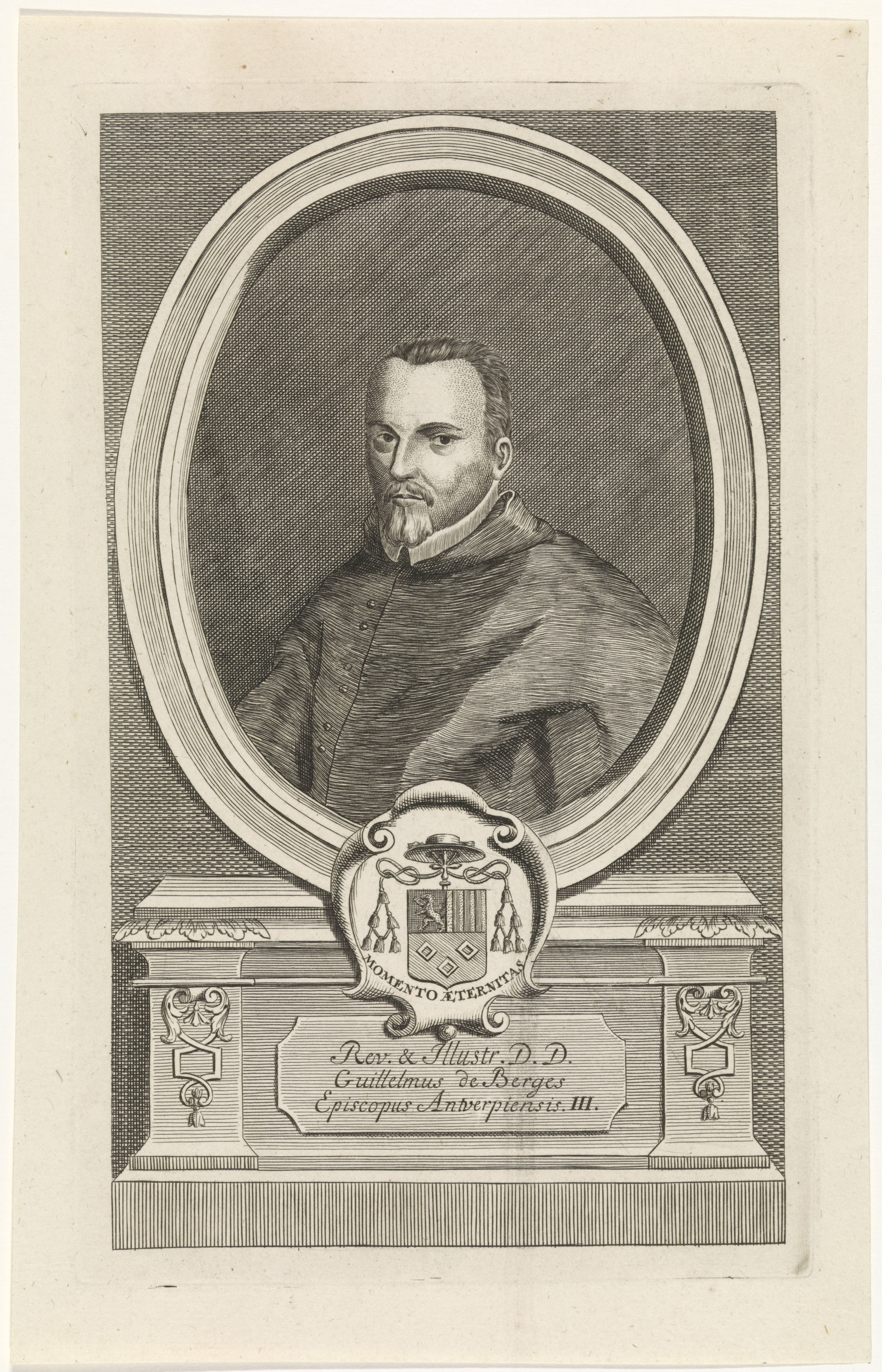
- Church: Roman Catholic
- Diocese: Cambrai
- See: Old Cambrai Cathedral
- Elected: 1601
- Other post: Bishop of Antwerp (1597–1601)
- Previous post: Dean of Saint Lambert's Cathedral, Liège (1585–1597)

Orders
- Consecration: 29 March 1598 (Antwerp)

Personal details
- Born: 1551 Antwerp, Duchy of Brabant, Spanish Netherlands
- Died: 25 April 1609 (aged 57–58) Cambrai, Free imperial city of the Holy Roman Empire
- Buried: Old Cambrai Cathedral
- Parents: Ferry de Glymes and Anne de Stercke
- Education: Theology, Law
- Alma mater: Louvain, Douai, Dole, Padua, Bologna

Guillaume de Berghes or of Glymes(1551–1609), baron of Grimbergen, was bishop of Antwerp from 1597 to 1601 and archbishop of Cambrai from 1601 until his death.

== Life ==
=== Family ===
Berghes was the third son of Ferry de Berghes, Baron of Grimberghen and Anne de Stercke, lady of Stabroeck, Bucquoy, Wyneghem, etc., who had grown up in Sterckshof. All the descendants of the branch of Grimbergen are called de Berghes to distinguish them from the other branches in the family. He was an uncle of Guillaume de Bette and a great-uncle of Alphonse de Berghes.

=== Career ===
After studying Law and Theology at the universities of Louvain, Douai, Dole, Padua and Bologna, Berghes was appointed a canon of the church of St John the Evangelist, Liège. On 8 April 1578 the prince-bishop of Liège, Gerard of Grœsbeek, appointed him dean of the chapter of St John the Evangelist, after a contested election. Having gone to Rome to obtain papal confirmation, Berghes was appointed a domestic prelate by Pope Gregory XIII. On 5 January 1583 he was transferred to a canonry of Saint Lambert's Cathedral, Liège, and shortly afterwards was sent to Rome as the envoy of Ernest of Bavaria. He was later sent on diplomatic missions to Alexander Farnese, Governor General of the Spanish Netherlands.

On 2 September 1585 he was elected dean of St Lambert's, taking possession of the post on 20 January 1586. In 1590–91 he again undertook negotiations in Rome.

He was appointed bishop of Antwerp in 1597, in succession to Laevinus Torrentius, and left Liège on 6 March 1598, being consecrated bishop on 29 March and installed in his see on 22 April. He served as bishop of Antwerp until 1601, when he was elected archbishop of Cambrai. He was succeeded in Antwerp by Joannes Miraeus.

=== Death and commemoration ===
Berghes died in Cambrai on 25 April 1609. By his will he established a bursary of 100 Brabant florins to support a German-speaking student in the seminary of Liège who would serve in one of the German-language parishes of the diocese. He was memorialised with a stained glass window in the choir of Liège cathedral, and a marble tomb in Cambrai cathedral.

Catholic Church titles
Preceded by Laevinus Torrentius	Bishop of Antwerp; 1597–1601	Succeeded by Joannes Miraeus
Preceded by Jean Sarazin	Archbishop of Cambrai; 1601–1609	Succeeded by Jean Richardot
