= Franciscus Sonnius =

Dutch theologian

Franciscus Sonnius (12 August 1506 – 30 June 1576) was a theologian during the time of the Catholic Reformation, the first bishop of 's-Hertogenbosch and later the first bishop of Antwerp. His family name was Van de Velde, but in later years he called himself after his native place, Son in Brabant. He came from the same noble family as philosopher Heymeric de Campo. The family has three golden mill-irons in their coat-of-arms, a sign that is depicted on the chair of the first bishop in the cathedral of Antwerp.

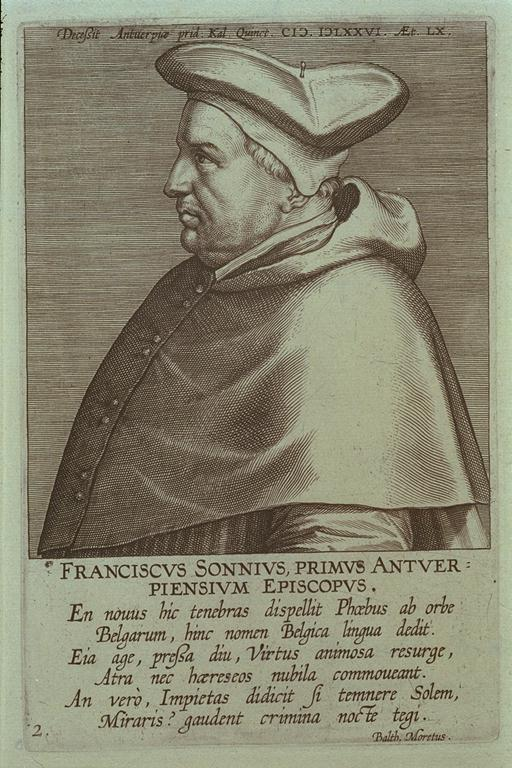
Franciscus Sonnius.

== Life ==
Sonnius was born in Son. He went to school in 's-Hertogenbosch and Leuven, and afterwards studied medicine for a time, then theology. In 1536 he received the licentiate and in 1539 the doctorate in theology. After labouring for a short time as a parish priest at Meerbeek, between 1535 and 1568 he was the 'pastor' of the parish St-Jacob in Leuven. He became professor of theology at Leuven University in 1544, and attended the Council of Trent in 1546, 1547, and 1551. He was sent to the council first by Bishop Charles de Croÿ, bishop of Tournai, then by Mary of Hungary, the regent of the Netherlands.

In 1557 he also took an active part in the Colloquy of Worms. Not long after this Philip II of Spain sent him to Rome to negotiate with Pope Paul IV in regard to ecclesiastical matters in the Netherlands, especially regarding increasing the number of dioceses and separating the Belgian monasteries from the German, as in the latter the Reformation was rapidly spreading. In acknowledgment of his success, he was appointed bishop of 's-Hertogenbosch in 1566, but he was not consecrated until two years later, by Cardinal Granvelle.

In 1569 he was appointed the first bishop of Antwerp, and in the following year entered into possession of his diocese. He founded an ecclesiastical court and visited all the parishes of his diocese. He proclaimed the decrees of the Council of Trent and established regular meetings of the deaneries. As bishop of Antwerp he held two diocesan synods, setting an example that exerted influence beyond the boundaries of the archdiocese of Mechelen. He resided in Antwerp until his death in 1576, aged 69. In 1616 the cathedral chapter and the city erected a monument to him.

== Works ==
He opposed Calvinism and wrote for this purpose a clear summary of its teachings for the use of the clergy, under the title Succincta demonstratio errorum confessionis Calvinistae recenter per has regiones sparsae (Leuven, 1567). He also wrote a textbook of dogmatics: Demonstrationum religionis christianae libri tres (Antwerp, 1564), to which in 1577, after his death, a fourth book was added, De sacramentis.
