= Oratorian College, Mechelen =

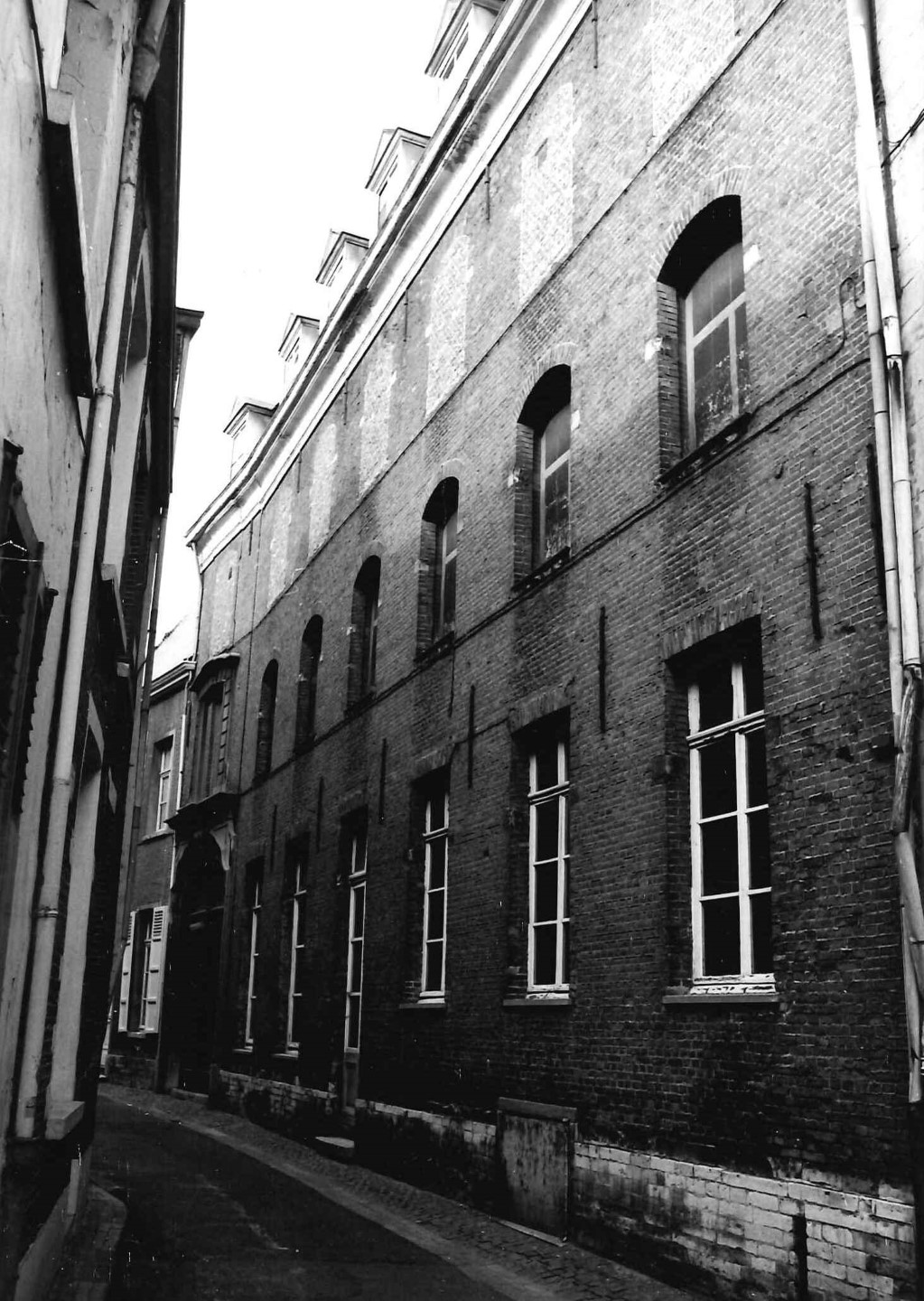
The 18th-century building of the Oratorian College at Schoolstraat 9, Mechelen

The Oratorian College in Mechelen was a Latin school that was run in the city of Mechelen by the Congregation of the Oratory from 1630 to 1796. Originally founded in the Middle Ages by a collegiate church, management was transferred to the civic magistracy in 1450 and to the Oratorians in 1630. The school was closed down by occupying French revolutionary forces in 1796. The 18th-century building of the Oratorian College is preserved as a listed monument.

== History ==
On 13 September 1448 an agreement was reached that the city of Mechelen would take over the running of the school founded by the Collegiate Church of St Rombout (now Mechelen Cathedral). This agreement came into effect in July 1450, after papal permission had been granted for the laicisation of an ecclesiastical institution and office (that of scholaster). Between 1450 and 1522 a number of buildings on what would come to be called the Schoolstraat were amalgamated and extended to create the civic Grootschool (great school). Teaching appointments and the decision whether pupils from the poor school would be funded to study further at the Grootschool lay with a board consisting of members of the city magistracy. In the early- and mid-16th century the school had a reputation as a centre of humanist education.

After the disturbances of the Dutch Revolt, particularly bad in Mechelen in the years 1572–1585, Joos Blieck was appointed as headmaster (serving 1588–1612). His attempts to revive the school as a civic institution had little impact. He was succeeded by his brother-in-law, Frans van Ophem, in 1612. The Jesuits had offered to take over the running of the school, and the city council was not averse to this change of management, but the archbishop's opposition prevented it. In 1615 the Jesuits set up their own college in Mechelen, competing with the civic school for the best students and teachers. Rivalry between the two institutions was settled by the intervention of the central government, which instructed that each of the two schools receive 1,000 guilders per year from the city council and neither charge tuition, also ordering that from 1616 students only be allowed to switch schools with the headmaster's permission.

On 12 March 1630 Archduchess Isabella granted permission for the running of the Grootschool to be transferred from the city to the Congregation of the Oratory, which revived the school's lustre but led to renewed rivalry with the Jesuit college. The position of scholaster was transferred back to the cathedral, but now only involved oversight of the city's primary schools, with the Latin schools of the Jesuits and the Oratorians functioning essentially independently under the oversight of their respective religious orders.

In 1750 the buildings of the 16th-century Grootschool were demolished, to be replaced with a new structure in 1751.

In 1796, during the French occupation, the school was shut down and the Oratorian community disbanded. Classes continued to be provided in private houses, first belonging to Baron Spangen and later P. J. Volders. In 1802 the French established a republican école secondaire in Mechelen.

In the two centuries after the suppression of the Oratorian College, the 18th-century school building was used variously as a tavern, theatre, private school, diocesan school, auction house, and parish offices. It was listed as a protected monument in 1989 and is currently a legal aid centre.

== Notable students ==
- Gérard Dominique Azevedo Continho y Bernal
- Cornelius Franciscus Nelis
