= Son, Netherlands =

Son
- Town
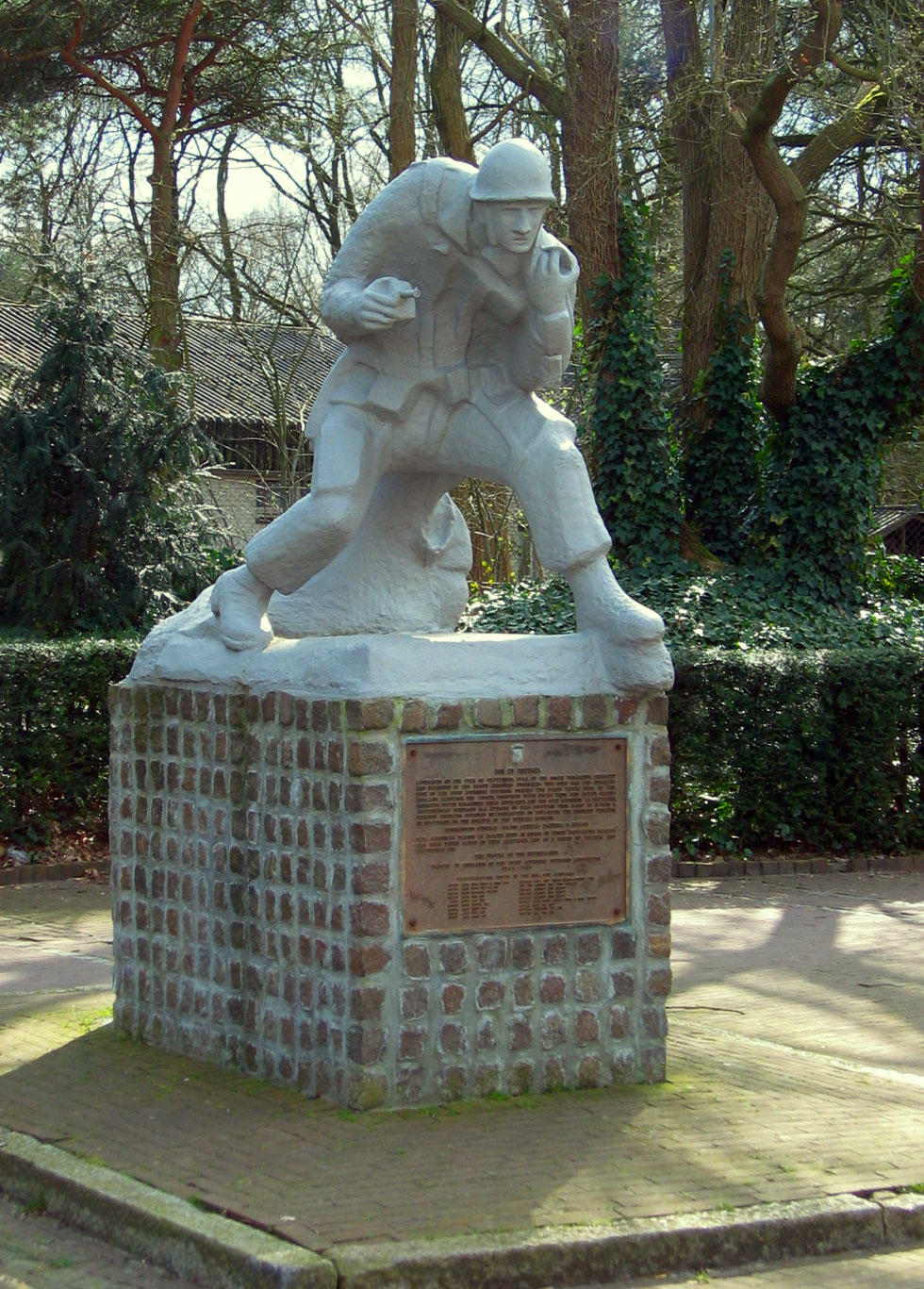
- Son Airborne Forces monument by Jan van Gemert

- Location in the province of North Brabant in the Netherlands Son (Netherlands)
- Coordinates: 51°31′N 5°30′E
- Country: Netherlands
- Province: North Brabant
- Municipality: Son en Breugel

Area
  - Total: 19.91 km^{2} (7.69 sq mi)
- Elevation: 15 m (49 ft)

Population (2021)
  - Total: 12,730
  - Density: 639.4/km^{2} (1,656/sq mi)
- Time zone: UTC+1 (CET)
  - Summer (DST): UTC+2 (CEST)
- Postal code: 5691
- Dialing code: 0499

Son is a town in the Dutch province of North Brabant, in the municipality of Son en Breugel. The nearest major city is Eindhoven.

== History ==
The village was first mentioned in 1107 as Sunna, and might mean creek. Son developed in the Middle Ages along the Dommel River, and has a triangular market square.

The church tower dates from around 1500. The matching church burnt down in 1958 and demolished in 1962. In 1960, the St Petrus church was built as a replacement, but at some distance from the tower. Son was home to 391 people in 1840.

During World War II, it was the site of a bridge, the capture of which was crucial to the success of Operation Market Garden in September 1944. The bridge itself was featured in the 1977 war film A Bridge Too Far.

== Gallery ==
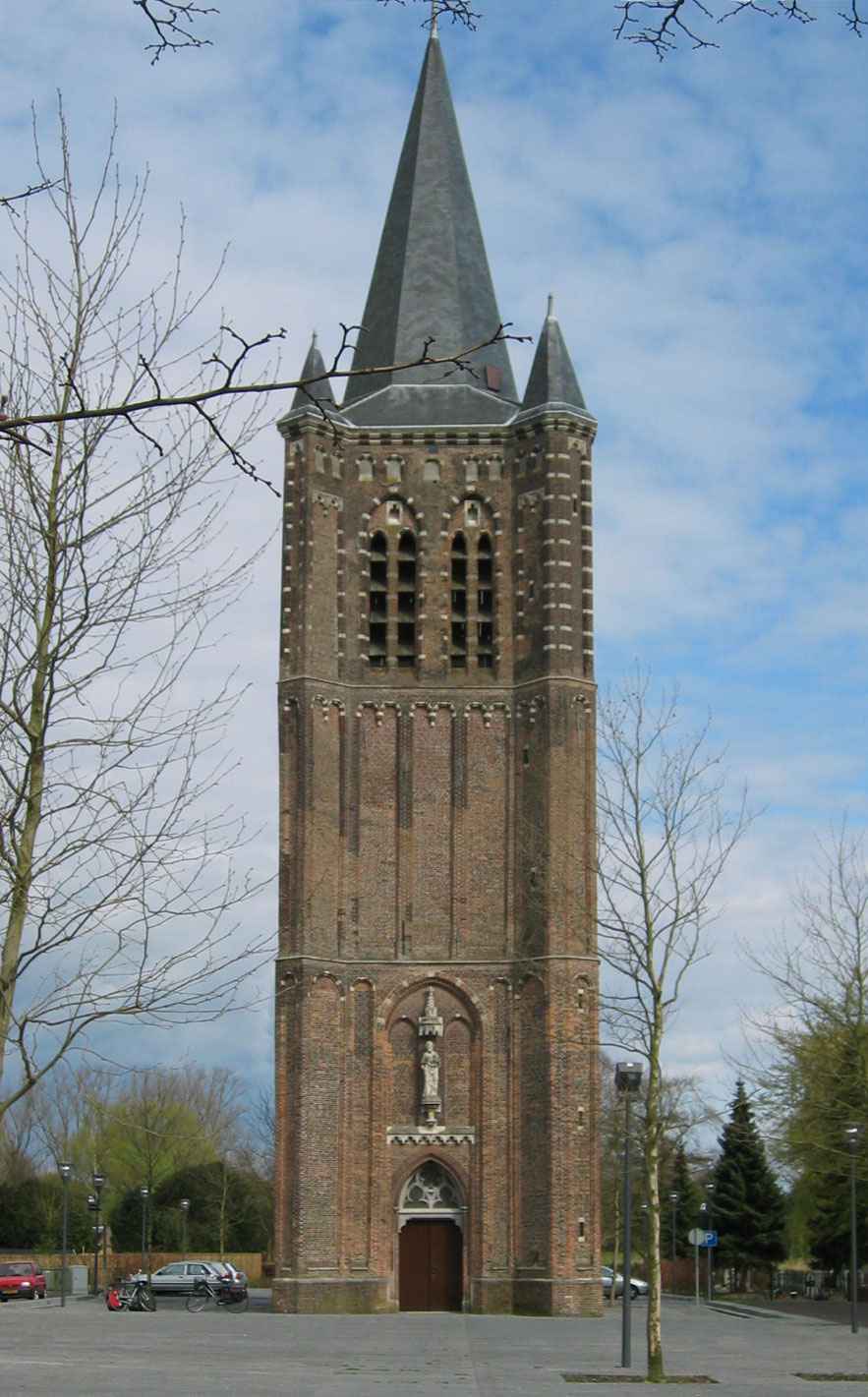
Church tower of Son

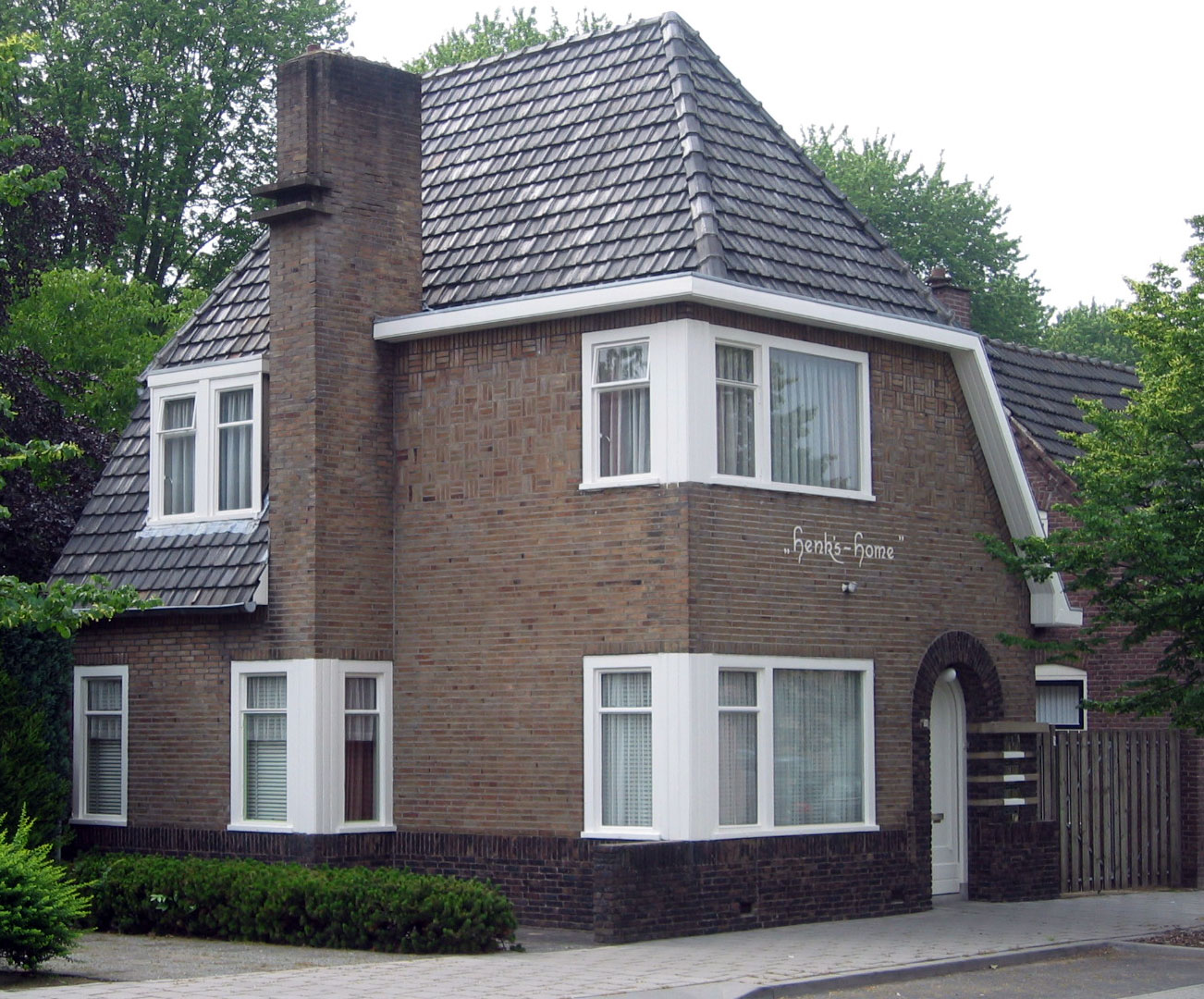
House in Son

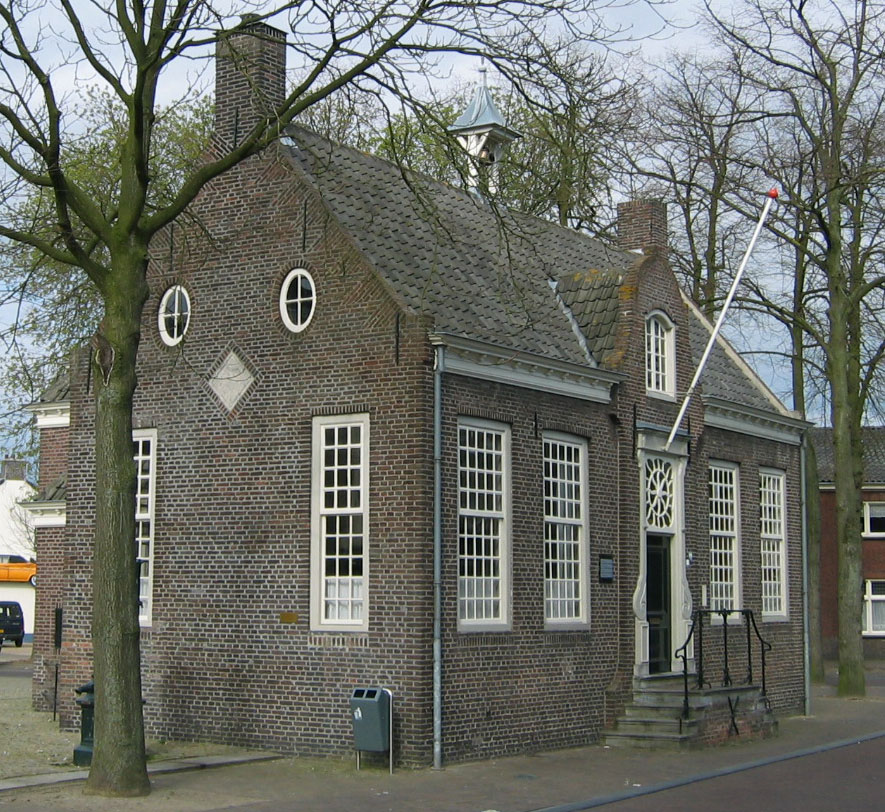
Old town hall
