= Daniël van Vlierden =

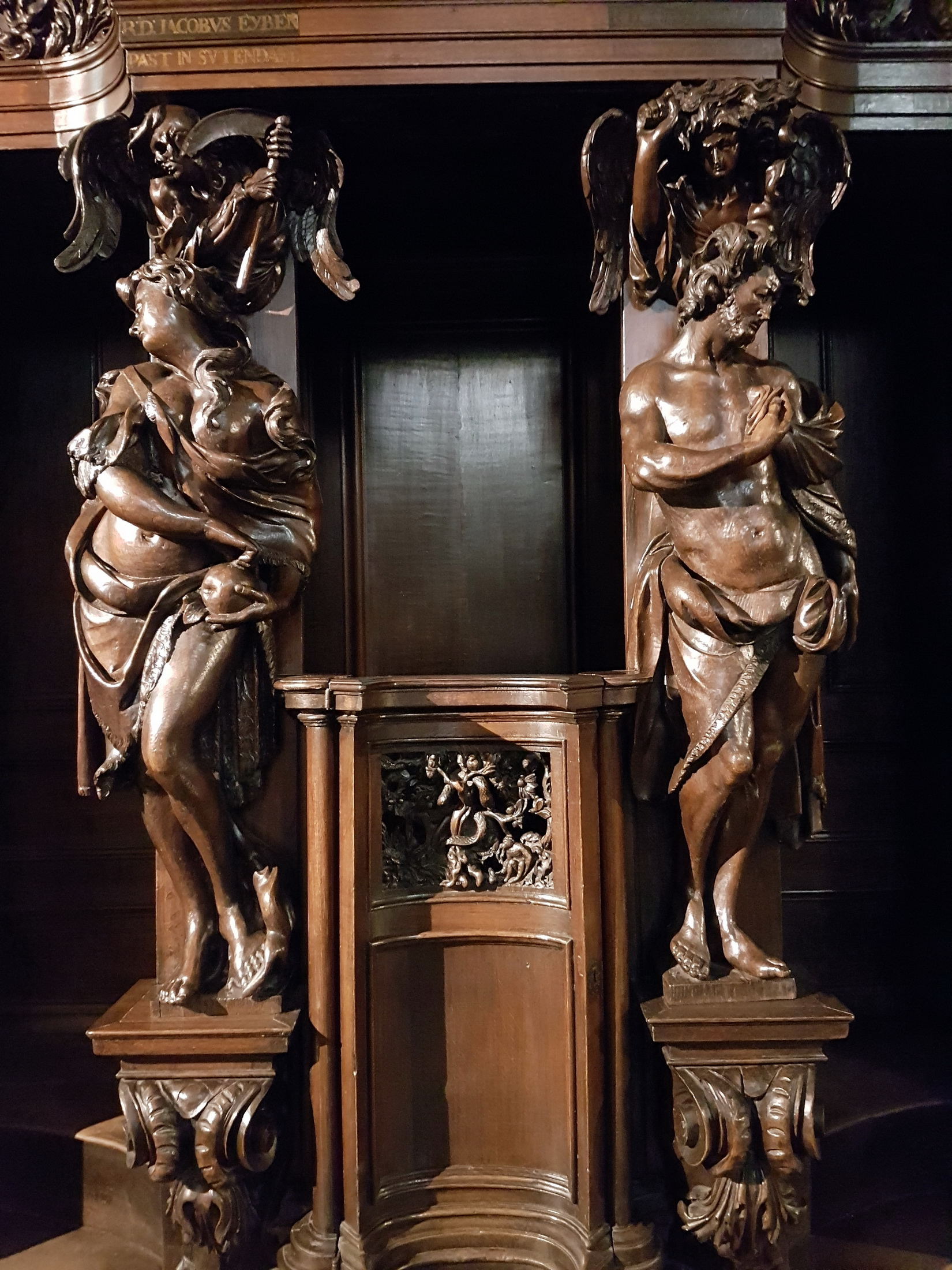
Adam and Eve, confessional in the Basilica of Saint Servatius, Maastricht

Daniël van Vlierden (1651, Hasselt – 1716, Hasselt) was a Flemish sculptor who is mainly known for his Baroque sculpture in churches in the Prince-Bishopric of Liège. The style of van Vlierden is characterized by a sober realism in both the decorative elements as the figure sculptures.

== Life ==
Daniël van Vlierden's father was the sculptor Mark van Vlierden, who had moved from his presumed native town Antwerp to Hasselt around 1641–1642 to set up a workshop there. Mark van Vlierden had likely been attracted by the opportunities that Hasselt offered to a sculptor and the limited local competition. Hasselt was the principal town of the Dutch speaking part of the Prince-Bishopric of Liège. It had recovered from the aftermath of the iconoclastic fervour of the Calvinists in the 16th century and could provide sufficient employ for a sculptor working in the latest style of Antwerp, the leading artistic centre in Flanders. Mark van Vlierden mainly worked on religious commissions.

The mother of Daniël van Vlierden was Elisabeth Pijlmans. Daniël had two brothers and two sisters. He was barely seven years old when his father died. There is no information about his training as a sculptor. Daniël married Catherine Gielen in Hasselt on 9 May 1676. Seven children were born from this marriage between 1678 and 1691. After their marriage, the couple moved to the 'Witte Haen' (White cock) in the Demerstraat in Hasselt. Van Vlierden was appointed steward of the Saint Quentin Church in Hasselt in 1678, a position he held until 1685.

He participated as a member of the Chamber of Bachelors in the battle of the Planck Meadow on New Year's Day 1682. He made a hole in the city walls so that the guns could be brought out. Apparently his actions were not held against him for long after the cessation of hostilities and he could take advantage of the general amnesty.

== Work ==
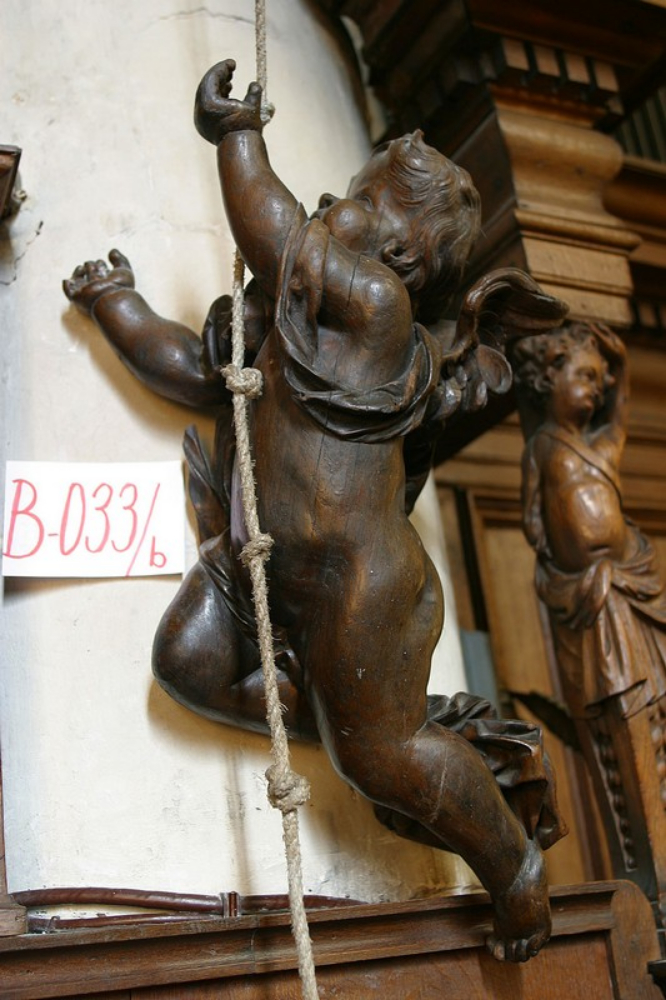
Angel

Van Vlierden was more than a skilled woodworker although he lacked the virtuosity of his contemporary Flemish Baroque sculptors.

He received a major commission for sculptures in the St. Peter in Chains Church in Beringen, Belgium pursuant to a contract signed in 1686. The Baroque paneling, altars and at least three of the confessionals in the church in Beringen were produced by van Vlierden in collaboration with cabinetmaker Tillman Janssens from Hasselt. Three of the four confessionals can be attributed with certainty to van Vlierden on the basis of stylistic similarities with the confessionals that he made for the Dominican church in Maastricht (now in the Basilica of Saint Servatius). The facial expressions and the arrangement of the figures point in the direction of van Vlierden. One confessional in the northern transept is probably the work of the eminent Antwerp sculptor Artus Quellinus II, given the similarity with the design drawn by Artus Quellinus II. The sculpture of the Holy Sepulchre in the north aisle of the church can also be attributed with certainty to van Vlierden. The main altar displays certain characteristics of van Vlierden's expressive forms. However, it cannot be attributed to him with certainty. The execution of the pulpit is certainly the work of another, less skilled sculptor.

Van Vlierden sculpted in the period 1682–1683 and in 1689 four side altars in the St. Catherine Church in Tongeren, which he completed with the assistance of Jan Caproens, a local carpenter.

The only work that has been signed by van Vlierden are seven confessionals that he made for the Dominican church in Maastricht and are now in the Basilica of Saint Servatius. One of the seven confessionals has a sculpture of King David holding a harp. On the body of the harp is written: d. van vlierden fecit hasselen. This ensemble can be dated between 1695 and 1706 on the basis of the dates that are painted on the confessionals. The iconography of the confessionals constitutes a coherent whole. This was in line with the requirements of the Counter-Reformation which demanded that artists created paintings and sculptures in church contexts that would speak to the illiterate rather than to the well-informed. The Counter-Reformation stressed certain points of religious doctrine, as a result of which certain church furniture, such as the confessional gained an increased importance. The Dominicans for whom van Vlierden made the confessionals in Maastricht also subscribed to the view that the confessionals should clarify the deeper meaning of the confession to the faithful. A similar programmatic scheme of confessionals and interior decoration had been implemented previously in the St. Paul's Church in Antwerp. The seven Maastricht confessionals follow this example.

H. Jaminé and J.-G. the Corswarem attribute to van Vlierden the equestrian statue of St. George and the Dragon above the altar in the chapel of St. Sebastian and St. George along the south portal of the St. Quentin Cathedral in Hasselt.

Van Vlierden also created a side altar in the St. Quentin Cathedral together with Tillman Janssens. This side altar that was likely similar to the main altar in the church in Beringen was sold at the end of the 19th century and has disappeared.

The emblem and escutcheon of the chamber of rhetoric De Roode Roos (The Red Rose) of Hasselt was also by his hand as it incorporates his own escutcheon.

== Style ==
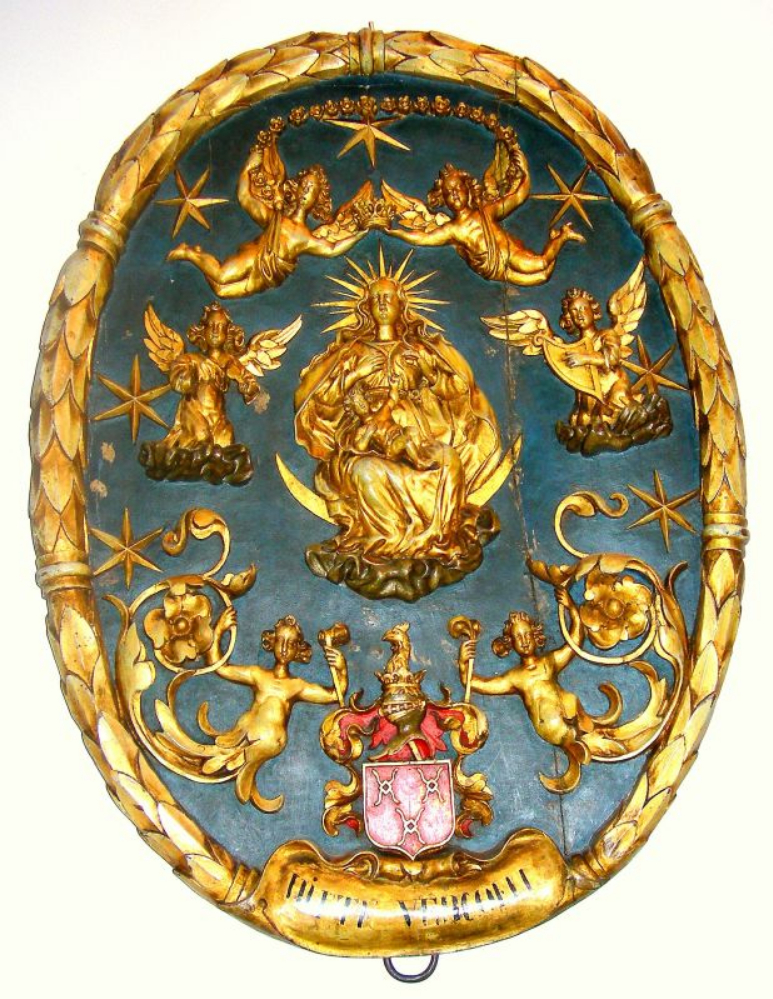
Escutcheon of the Roode Roos

Van Vlierden's style is represented most clearly in the confessionals he made for the churches in Beringen and Maastricht. The treatment of garments typical of the high Baroque was alien to him. He draped the garments of the figures in a natural way around the bodies, without, however, accentuating the bodyparts. At the height of the hip of the static leg the busy folds, along with the movement of the arm, compensate the dynamics of the moving leg. The Contrapposto pose is used in all the figures of the confessionals and the two figures on each side of the confessionals always mirror each other. The muscles of the upper body, abdomen, arms and legs are represented in an almost anatomically exact manner. By respecting the general proportions and a natural posture the sculptures appear lifelike. Each figure is typified as an individual through the appropriate clothing and attributes. In the small-scale sculptures van Vlierden dared to emphasize movement which he, however, downplayed in the life-size sculptures.

The style of van Vlierden is characterized by a sober realism in both the decorative elements as the figure sculptures. In Beringen he worked after a design by Artus Quellinus II. As a result he was confronted directly with the prevailing high Baroque idiom which he followed faithfully in the decorative elements but not in the depiction of the angels and saints. These are as austere as the images of the penitents, which he executed some 15 years later in Maastricht where he even omitted the high Baroque decorative elements. Compared to his contemporaries from Flanders and the Prince-Bishopric of Liège, he lacked the exuberant flourish and movement. His decorations and figure sculptures aimed to be functional within the macro-framework of the church and the micro-context of the confessional and the altar. The Baroque element was clearly present, but did not dominate.
