= Patrick Hoogmartens =

Belgian prelate of the Catholic Church (born 1952)

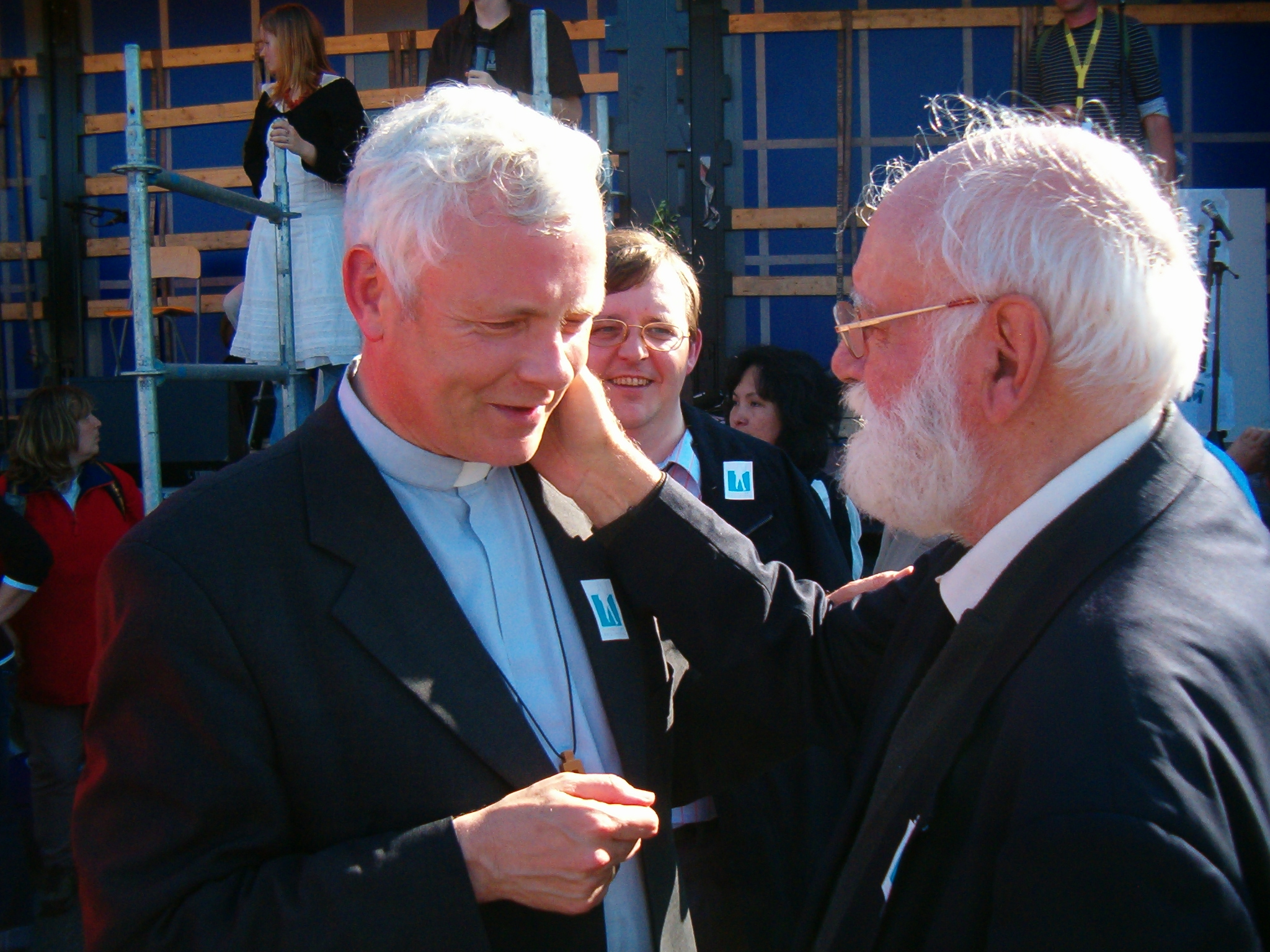
- Bishop Hoogmartens (left) with Jef Ulburghs in 2007
- Diocese: Hasselt
- See: St. Quentin Cathedral, Hasselt
- Installed: 2004
- Predecessor: Paul Schruers
- Previous post: Coadjutor bishop of Hasselt

Orders
- Ordination: 4 July 1982
- Consecration: 26 October 1997

Personal details
- Born: 19 May 1952 (age 74) Tongeren, Belgium
- Education: KU Leuven and Alphonsian Academy
- Motto: Non ut iudicet, sed ut salvetur ("Not to judge but to save", Jn 3:17)
- Coat of arms

Patrick Hoogmartens (born 1952) is a Belgian prelate of the Catholic Church who has served as the third bishop of the Diocese of Hasselt since 2004.

== Life ==
Hoogmartens was born in Tongeren on 19 May 1952 and was educated at schools in the city. He studied at the Katholieke Universiteit Leuven, graduating licentiate in Law (1977) and Philosophy (1978). He then entered the seminary, where he studied Theology. He was ordained to the priesthood on 4 July 1982 in the Basilica of Our Lady, Tongeren, and undertook further studies at the Alphonsian Academy, graduating Licentiate of Sacred Theology.

On 1 September 1989 he was appointed president of the Major Seminary in Hasselt. On 8 July 1997 Pope John Paul II appointed him coadjutor bishop of Hasselt. He was consecrated bishop in Hasselt Cathedral on 26 October 1997. When Pope John Paul accepted the resignation of Bishop Paul Schruers on 25 October 2004, Hoogmartens succeeded him as the third bishop of Hasselt. He was enthroned as bishop on 12 December 2004.

He sits on the Board of Trustees of the KU Leuven. In 2016 he gave permission for the reliquary of St Odilia at Mariënlof Abbey in Borgloon to be unsealed for academic research.
