= Paul Schruers =

- Diocese: Hasselt
- See: St. Quentin Cathedral, Hasselt
- Installed: 1989
- Term ended: 2004
- Predecessor: Jozef Heusschen
- Successor: Patrick Hoogmartens
- Previous post: Auxiliary bishop of Hasselt

Orders
- Ordination: 8 December 1954
- Consecration: 31 May 1970

Personal details
- Born: 25 October 1929 Hasselt, Limburg, Belgium
- Died: 25 August 2008 (aged 78) Hasselt, Limburg, Belgium
- Buried: Klaarland Priory
- Education: Minor seminary, Sint-Truiden
- Alma mater: Diocesan Seminary of Liège
- Motto: In medio nostri Christus ("Christ is among us", Mt. 18:20)

Paul Schruers (1929–2008) was the second Bishop of Hasselt in Belgium.

== Life ==
Schruers was born in Hasselt on 25 October 1929. He experienced a sense of religious vocation from the age of 16. He studied at the minor seminary in Sint-Truiden and the Diocesan Seminary of Liège, where he was ordained to the priesthood in 1954.

From 1957 to 1967 he was professor of dogmatic theology at the Diocesan Seminary in Liège. He was appointed vicar general when the diocese of Hasselt was founded in 1967, and auxiliary bishop in 1970. On 15 December 1989 he succeeded Jozef Heusschen as bishop. Pope John Paul II accepted his resignation on 25 October 2004.

After a brain haemorrhage in May 2008 he never fully recovered. He died on 25 August 2008 and was buried at Klaarland Priory on 2 September, after a funeral mass in Hasselt Cathedral.
