= List of protected heritage sites in Beringen, Belgium =

This table shows an overview of the protected heritage sites in the Flemish town Beringen, Belgium. This list is part of Belgium's national heritage.

Object	Status^{?}	Year/architect	Town/section	Address	Coordinates	Number^{?}	Image
Watermill, "Holy Ghost Mill" ^{(nl)} ^{(fr)}			Beringen	Beekstraat 50	51.04381°N 5.20592°E	21407 Info	
Chapel of Broekhoven Smeedkapel ^{(nl)} ^{(fr)}	Yes		Beringen	Broekhovenstraat	51.04391°N 5.22752°E	21408 Info	
Former cafe "The Crown" ^{(nl)} ^{(fr)}			Beringen	Brugstraat 1	51.04833°N 5.21989°E	21409 Info	
Former cafe "The Crown" ^{(nl)} ^{(fr)}			Beringen	Brugstraat 3	51.04833°N 5.21989°E	21409 Info	
Watermill and mill house ^{(nl)} ^{(fr)}			Beringen	Brulmolenstraat 2	51.05197°N 5.22671°E	21410 Info	
Soldiers Chapel of 1915 ^{(nl)} ^{(fr)}			Beringen	Everselstraat	51.03921°N 5.23005°E	21411 Info	
Corner house "Saint Anthony" of 1634 ^{(nl)} ^{(fr)}			Beringen	Hoogstraat 5	51.04806°N 5.22340°E	21413 Info	
St. Peter in Chains Church ^{(nl)} ^{(fr)}	Yes		Beringen	Markt 6	51.04838°N 5.22489°E	21415 Info	
Farm (former) ^{(nl)} ^{(fr)}			Beringen	Markt 7	51.04824°N 5.22523°E	21417 Info	
Property in eclectic style ^{(nl)} ^{(fr)}			Beringen	Markt 11	51.04786°N 5.22570°E	21418 Info	
Neoclassical house, now pub ^{(nl)} ^{(fr)}			Beringen	Markt 17	51.04763°N 5.22476°E	21419 Info	
Kapelanie (former) ^{(nl)} ^{(fr)}			Beringen	Markt 18	51.04763°N 5.22462°E	21420 Info	
Empire-style dwelling ^{(nl)} ^{(fr)}	Yes		Beringen	Markt 20	51.04764°N 5.22437°E	21421 Info	
Neoclassical corner house ^{(nl)} ^{(fr)}			Beringen	Markt 23	51.04792°N 5.22376°E	21422 Info	
Parish Church Saint-Lambert ^{(nl)} ^{(fr)}	Yes		Beringen	Beverlo-Dorp	51.08721°N 5.22018°E	21423 Info	
Neoclassical mansion ^{(nl)} ^{(fr)}			Beringen	Beverlo-Dorp 19	51.08802°N 5.22113°E	21424 Info	
Mattress Factory, former wolweverij ^{(nl)} ^{(fr)}			Beringen	Eindekenstraat 45	51.09399°N 5.22726°E	21426 Info	
Long stretched farm ^{(nl)} ^{(fr)}	Yes		Beringen	Korspelsesteenweg 104	51.08891°N 5.23540°E	21427 Info	
Saint Anthony's Chapel of 1680 ^{(nl)} ^{(fr)}	Yes		Beringen	Groenhoekstraat	51.08866°N 5.24791°E	21428 Info	
St. Bridget Parish ^{(nl)} ^{(fr)}	Yes		Beringen	Kerkplein 2	51.05901°N 5.27282°E	21431 Info	
House, double house ^{(nl)} ^{(fr)}			Beringen	Koersel-Dorp 6	51.05917°N 5.27316°E	21432 Info	
double house ^{(nl)} ^{(fr)}			Beringen	Koersel-Dorp 8	51.05917°N 5.27316°E	21432 Info	
section house of 1851 ^{(nl)} ^{(fr)}			Beringen	Koersel-Dorp 25	51.05885°N 5.27376°E	21434 Info	
elongated farm ^{(nl)} ^{(fr)}			Beringen	Leemstraat	51.07111°N 5.29963°E	21435 Info	
Watermill, "Vurtense mill" ^{(nl)} ^{(fr)}			Beringen	Molendijk 103	51.05828°N 5.24261°E	21438 Info	
Farm ^{(nl)} ^{(fr)}			Beringen	Pannehoefstraat 31	51.06696°N 5.29534°E	21439 Info	
Farm ^{(nl)} ^{(fr)}			Beringen	Pannehoefstraat 33	51.06696°N 5.29534°E	21439 Info	
Farm ^{(nl)} ^{(fr)}			Beringen	Pannehoefstraat 35	51.06696°N 5.29534°E	21439 Info	
St. Joseph Chapel ^{(nl)} ^{(fr)}			Beringen	Pastorijstraat	51.06164°N 5.27379°E	21440 Info	
Our Lady Chapel ^{(nl)} ^{(fr)}			Beringen	Pastorijstraat	51.06043°N 5.27879°E	21441 Info	
Castle "Quanonen" (former) ^{(nl)} ^{(fr)}			Beringen	Pastorijstraat 2	51.06091°N 5.27079°E	21442 Info	
Long stretched farm ^{(nl)} ^{(fr)}			Beringen	Pastorijstraat 29	51.06140°N 5.27448°E	21443 Info	
Rectory ^{(nl)} ^{(fr)}	Yes		Beringen	Pastorijstraat 49	51.06119°N 5.27645°E	21444 Info	
Our Lady Chapel ^{(nl)} ^{(fr)}			Beringen	Trompetstraat	51.05408°N 5.25412°E	21450 Info	
Chapel of Our Lady-to-the-Stake of 1833 ^{(nl)} ^{(fr)}			Beringen	Fonteintjestraat 18	51.08300°N 5.32221°E	21451 Info	
Chapel of Our Lady of Peace- ^{(nl)} ^{(fr)}			Beringen	Heerbaan	51.07206°N 5.24964°E	21453 Info	
Watermill "Stalse Mill" ^{(nl)} ^{(fr)}	Yes		Beringen	Stalse Molenstraat 20	51.06338°N 5.24510°E	21457 Info	
section house ^{(nl)} ^{(fr)}	Yes		Beringen	Beverlosesteenweg 1	51.04071°N 5.17227°E	21458 Info	
Parish Church of St John the Baptist ^{(nl)} ^{(fr)}	Yes		Beringen	Paal-Dorp	51.03934°N 5.17325°E	21461 Info	
Corner ^{(nl)} ^{(fr)}			Beringen	Pater Carremansstraat 2	51.03888°N 5.17295°E	21462 Info	
House with barn transverse ^{(nl)} ^{(fr)}	Yes		Beringen	Schoolstraat 26	51.03825°N 5.17540°E	21464 Info	
House with barn transverse ^{(nl)} ^{(fr)}	Yes		Beringen	Schoolstraat 28	51.03825°N 5.17540°E	21464 Info	
Watermill, "Gestelse mill" ^{(nl)} ^{(fr)}			Beringen	Maalbeekstraat 101	51.02913°N 5.19222°E	21472 Info	
elongated farm ^{(nl)} ^{(fr)}			Beringen	Sint-Janstraat 42	51.03760°N 5.17677°E	21473 Info	
Parish of Our Lady Immaculate-Received ^{(nl)} ^{(fr)}			Beringen	Pastoor Grausstraat	51.06153°N 5.19810°E	21474 Info	
Road chapel ^{(nl)} ^{(fr)}			Beringen	Schipperstraat	51.06583°N 5.19932°E	21475 Info	
Long stretched farm XIX ^{(nl)} ^{(fr)}			Beringen	Schipperstraat 25	51.06508°N 5.19832°E	21476 Info	
Parish Church St. Theodardus ^{(nl)} ^{(fr)}	Yes		Beringen	Koolmijnlaan	51.07576°N 5.22110°E	21477 Info	More images
Sacred Heart Parish ^{(nl)} ^{(fr)}			Beringen	Kroonstraat	51.08962°N 5.24960°E	83613 Info	
Shafts, shaft towers and buildings pickup ^{(nl)} ^{(fr)}	Yes		Beringen	Koolmijnlaan	51.06801°N 5.22328°E	200555 Info	
Reception buildings ^{(nl)} ^{(fr)}	Yes		Beringen	Koolmijnlaan	51.06939°N 5.22285°E	200556 Info	
Coal washing and kolenzeverij ^{(nl)} ^{(fr)}	Yes		Beringen	Koolmijnlaan	51.06960°N 5.22399°E	200557 Info	
Stone Deposit ^{(nl)} ^{(fr)}			Beringen	Koolmijnlaan	51.06944°N 5.22735°E	200558 Info	
Stone Deposit ^{(nl)} ^{(fr)}			Beringen	Koolmijnlaan	51.06944°N 5.22735°E	200558 Info	
Electric central ^{(nl)} ^{(fr)}	Yes		Beringen	Koolmijnlaan	51.06886°N 5.22270°E	200560 Info	
Cooling towers ^{(nl)} ^{(fr)}	Yes		Beringen	Koolmijnlaan	51.06783°N 5.22192°E	200561 Info	
Central Water ^{(nl)} ^{(fr)}	Yes		Beringen	Koolmijnlaan	51.06791°N 5.22246°E	200562 Info	
Concrete clear ponds ^{(nl)} ^{(fr)}	Yes		Beringen	Koolmijnlaan	51.06464°N 5.22475°E	200563 Info	
Work houses ^{(nl)} ^{(fr)}	Yes		Beringen	Koolmijnlaan	51.06699°N 5.22327°E	200564 Info	
Passerelle and water tower ^{(nl)} ^{(fr)}	Yes		Beringen	Stationsstraat	51.07313°N 5.22394°E	200566 Info	
Coal Harbour ^{(nl)} ^{(fr)}	Yes		Beringen	Olmsesteenweg	51.06882°N 5.19595°E	200567 Info	
Central offices ^{(nl)} ^{(fr)}	Yes		Beringen	Koolmijnlaan	51.07003°N 5.22207°E	200568 Info	
Changing rooms and showers ^{(nl)} ^{(fr)}	Yes		Beringen	Koolmijnlaan	51.07040°N 5.22260°E	200569 Info	
Fence, control building, dining room and locker room building and social ^{(nl)} ^{(fr)}	Yes		Beringen	Koolmijnlaan	51.07115°N 5.22096°E	200571 Info	
Fence, control building, dining room and locker room building and social ^{(nl)} ^{(fr)}	Yes		Beringen	Koolmijnlaan	51.07115°N 5.22096°E	200571 Info	
Fence, control building, dining room and locker room building and social ^{(nl)} ^{(fr)}	Yes		Beringen	Koolmijnlaan	51.07115°N 5.22096°E	200571 Info	
Directors and engineering properties ^{(nl)} ^{(fr)}	Yes		Beringen	Koolmijnlaan 152	51.06326°N 5.22097°E	200572 Info	
Directors and engineering properties ^{(nl)} ^{(fr)}	Yes		Beringen	Koolmijnlaan 158	51.06326°N 5.22097°E	200572 Info	
Directors and engineering properties ^{(nl)} ^{(fr)}	Yes		Beringen	Koolmijnlaan 162	51.06326°N 5.22097°E	200572 Info	
Directors and engineering properties ^{(nl)} ^{(fr)}	Yes		Beringen	Koolmijnlaan 164	51.06326°N 5.22097°E	200572 Info	
Directors and engineering properties ^{(nl)} ^{(fr)}	Yes		Beringen	Koolmijnlaan 166	51.06326°N 5.22097°E	200572 Info	
Directors and engineering properties ^{(nl)} ^{(fr)}	Yes		Beringen	Koolmijnlaan 168	51.06326°N 5.22097°E	200572 Info	
Directors and engineering properties ^{(nl)} ^{(fr)}	Yes		Beringen	Koolmijnlaan 170	51.06326°N 5.22097°E	200572 Info	
Directors and engineering properties ^{(nl)} ^{(fr)}	Yes		Beringen	Koolmijnlaan 172	51.06326°N 5.22097°E	200572 Info	
Directors and engineering properties ^{(nl)} ^{(fr)}	Yes		Beringen	Koolmijnlaan 174	51.06326°N 5.22097°E	200572 Info	
Directors and engineering properties ^{(nl)} ^{(fr)}	Yes		Beringen	Koolmijnlaan 176	51.06326°N 5.22097°E	200572 Info	
Directors and engineering properties ^{(nl)} ^{(fr)}	Yes		Beringen	Koolmijnlaan 178	51.06326°N 5.22097°E	200572 Info	
Directors and engineering properties ^{(nl)} ^{(fr)}	Yes		Beringen	Koolmijnlaan 180	51.06326°N 5.22097°E	200572 Info	
Directors and engineering properties ^{(nl)} ^{(fr)}	Yes		Beringen	Koolmijnlaan 182	51.06326°N 5.22097°E	200572 Info	
Directors and engineering properties ^{(nl)} ^{(fr)}	Yes		Beringen	Koolmijnlaan 184	51.06326°N 5.22097°E	200572 Info	
Directors and engineering properties ^{(nl)} ^{(fr)}	Yes		Beringen	Koolmijnlaan 186	51.06326°N 5.22097°E	200572 Info	
Directors and engineering properties ^{(nl)} ^{(fr)}	Yes		Beringen	Koolmijnlaan 188	51.06326°N 5.22097°E	200572 Info	
Directors and engineering properties ^{(nl)} ^{(fr)}	Yes		Beringen	Koolmijnlaan 190	51.06326°N 5.22097°E	200572 Info	
Directors and engineering properties ^{(nl)} ^{(fr)}	Yes		Beringen	Koolmijnlaan 192	51.06326°N 5.22097°E	200572 Info	
Directors and engineering properties ^{(nl)} ^{(fr)}	Yes		Beringen	Koolmijnlaan 194	51.06326°N 5.22097°E	200572 Info	
Directors and engineering properties ^{(nl)} ^{(fr)}	Yes		Beringen	Koolmijnlaan 196	51.06326°N 5.22097°E	200572 Info	
Directors and engineering properties ^{(nl)} ^{(fr)}	Yes		Beringen	Koolmijnlaan 198	51.06326°N 5.22097°E	200572 Info	
Directors and engineering properties ^{(nl)} ^{(fr)}	Yes		Beringen	Koolmijnlaan 200	51.06326°N 5.22097°E	200572 Info	
Directors and engineering properties ^{(nl)} ^{(fr)}	Yes		Beringen	Koolmijnlaan 206	51.06326°N 5.22097°E	200572 Info	
Railways ^{(nl)} ^{(fr)}	Yes		Beringen	Koolmijnlaan		201200 Info	

Object	Status^{?}	Year/architect	Town/section	Address	Coordinates	Number^{?}	Image
Coalmine in Beringen ^{(nl)} ^{(fr)}			Beringen	Koolmijnlaan 201-203		20883 Info	
Coalmine of Beringen: Tuinwijk ^{(nl)} ^{(fr)}	Yes		Beringen	Aakstraat 1-3; Alfred Habetslaan 2-40; Berkenstraat 1-23 en 2-28; Beverlosesteenweg 444-454 en 445-451; Bootstraat 1-11; Duinenstraat 1-9 en 2-8; Dwarsstraat 1-23 en 2-16; Eeuwfeestplein 1-33 en 2-40; Gouden Jubileumplein 1-23 en 2-24; Havenlaan 3-7 en 68-134; Hotelstraat 1-9 en 2-8; Kanaalstraat 1-75 en 2-34; Kastanjestraat 1-9 en 2-20; Kioskplein 1-25 en 2-28; Klimopstraat 1, 2-24; Koolmijnlaan 152, 158, 162-224 en 337-343; Krommestraat 1-3, 2-8; Laan op Vurten 1-135 en 2-130; Leysestraat 1-135 en 2-130; Lindestraat 1-5 en 2-6; Louis Sauvestrelaan 1-67 en 2-92; Mijnschoolstraat 84-88; Oosterspeelplein; Plataanstraat 1-7 en 2-8; Randstraat 8-20; Rondplein 1-23, Sorbebomenstraat 1-7 en 2-14; Spoorwegstraat 1-7 en 2-24; Stadionlaan 1-83 en 2-62; Stationkaai 1-59; Stationsstraat 59-111 en 84-110; Tennisstraat 1-39 en 2-16; Visvangststraat 24-46; Vossenbergstraat 1-31; Watersportlaan 1-15 en 2-16; Westerspeelplein 2-8; Wilgenstraat 1-21 en 2-20; Zandhoefstraat 1-25 en 2-4		22159 Info	
Coalmine of Beringen: Tuinwijk of Koersel ^{(nl)} ^{(fr)}	Yes		Beringen	Aakstraat 1-3 en 2-4; Beverlosesteenweg 444-454 en 445-451; Bootstraat 1-11; Eeuwfeestplein 1-33 en 2-40; Gouden Jubileumplein 1-23 en 2-24; Havenlaan 3-7 en 68-134; Kanaalstraat 1-75 en 2-34; Kioskplein 1-25 en 2-28; Koolmijnlaan 206-224; Krommestraat 1-3 en 2-8; Mijnschoolstraat 84-88; Stadionlaan 1-83 en 2-62; Tennisstraat 1-39 en 2-16; Visvangststraat 24-46; Watersportlaan 1-15 en 2-16; Zandhoefstraat 1-25 en 2-4		22199 Info	
Coalmine of Beringen: Tuinwijk Beverlo ^{(nl)} ^{(fr)}	Yes		Beringen	Alfred Habetslaan 2-40; Berkenstraat 1-23 en 2-28; Duinenstraat 1-9 en 2-8; Dwarsstraat 1-23 en 2-16; Hotelstraat 1-9 en 2-8; Kastanjestraat 1-9 en 2-20; Klimopstraat 1 en 2-24; Koolmijnlaan 337-343; Laan op Vurten 1-135 en 2-130; Leysestraat 69-111; Lindestraat 1-5 en 2-6; Louis Sauvestrelaan 1-67 en 2-92; Oosterspeelplein; Plataanstraat 1-7 en 2-8; Randstraat 8-20; Rondplein 1-23; Sorbebomenstraat 1-7 en 2-14; Spoorwegstraat 1-7 en 2-24; Stationkaai 1-59; Stationsstraat 59-111 en 84-110; Vossenbergstraat 1-31; Westerspeelplein 2-8; Wilgenstraat 1-21 en 2-20		22201 Info	

== See also ==
- List of onroerend erfgoed in Limburg (Belgium)
- Beringen, Belgium
