= Jef Ulburghs =

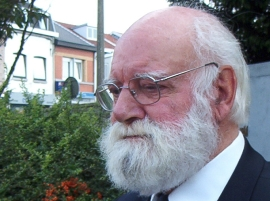
Jef Ulburghs

Jef Ulburghs (June 9, 1922 – August 31, 2010) was a Belgian priest and politician. He actively engaged in protests for the rights of miners, steelworkers, migrants, political refugees, deserted neighbourhoods and the Third World. He enjoyed international appreciation as a peace activist. Ulburghs worked in the tradition of nineteenth-century priests who committed their religious commitment to the social struggle of the poor and lower social classes. Ulburghs worked in social work in the seventies.

== Early life ==
Jef Ulburghs was raised in a middle class farming family. He was the youngest of six children and grew up in Heusden-Zolder. Ulburghs was a cattle trader and promoter of the local cooperative dairy.

== Years in Wallonia (1947–1969) ==
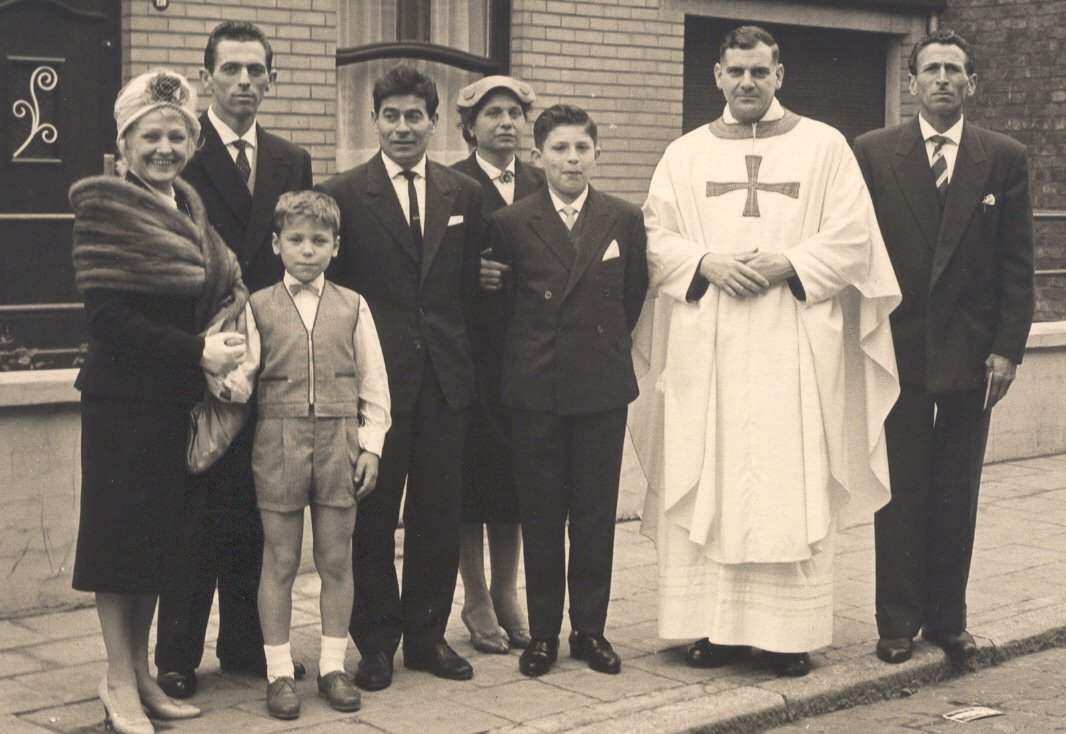
Jef Ulburghs and a group of Italians in Grâce-Berleur

Ulburgh asked Monsignor Van Zuylen, who later became Bishop, to appoint him in a miners' neighbourhood. In 1947 he became Vice President of the Paroisse Notre-Dame Auxiliatrice, Grâce-Berleur, Diocese of Liège, a grey "red" neighbourhood with miners and steel workers.

In 1962, he was appointed as Almoner of the social work in Seraing, the secretariat of which was located near the entrance of Cockerill-Sambre. Ulburghs founded a folk high school college for workers and, in the meanwhile, studied political and social sciences at the Leuven University.

=== Work in Limburg ===
After the founding of the new Roman Catholic Diocese of Hasselt, Bishop Heusschen Ulburghs returned to Limburg and became Secretary of the Pastoral Council and Chairman of the Commission Justice and Peace.

He founded the Community & Development in 1969, following a concept of the Walloon Communauté et Développement, founded in 1968 in Liège. It saw people's development as one of the ways to liberation . The name World Schools originated after 1970 when the emphasis was placed on the formation of militants on the one hand and the possibility for workers of workers to obtain a university degree on the other hand (in 1973, the University of Labor would originate). In theory, World Schools for Education and Community and Development for the Action were different, but in practice, they both ran together

In the early 1970s, Ulburghs was on the barricades during the big miners' strike. His presence between the strikers at the factory gates brought him into collision with his church rulers and the ACV. The conflict was resolved with a postponement in Zwartberg. During that period, Jef Ulburghs was also literally on the barricades against the construction of the A-24 (now north–south) motorway in Limburg

In 1971, Ulburghs went to the UNCTAD Conference in Santiago, Chile. There he held a hunger strike.

In 1974, World Schools merged with the Center for Formation and Action (CVA), originated from the torn left-wing Young Davids Fund. World Schools took on the adult activity and CVA's youth work. The name Community and Development disappeared. During the only Congress of World Schools in 1975, the original option of a formation movement was redefined as democratic basic socialism . From 1975 onwards, national operations were influenced by local operations or base groups, and national actions were seldom organised. This translated into local forms of education (around the Third World, guest workers, city issues, women's emancipation, alcoholism, peace building, etc.), neighbourhood work, health care, workers' work and education, world shops. Only in Limburg, the movement also reached the villages, elsewhere they restricted themselves to one or two cities.

In 1975, Ulburghs started working as a priest neighbourhood worker in Genk–Zwartberg. He continued his basic work. Thus he found in Genk and other former mining towns in Limburg the basis of neighbourhood and tenant syndicates.

== Political career (1982–1995) ==
Supported and fully encouraged by his growing number of supporters, Ulburghs decided to actively pursue politics in the early 1980s. He was chosen as an independent candidate on the SP List. He served on the city council of Genk (1982–1989), where he drew attention to the problems of the miners' neighbourhoods. He often challenged Mayor Louis Gaethofs, but earned the respect of local residents whose problems he put on the table.

He supported the Workers' Party of Belgium. He protested arm in arm, in the first row, along with hundreds of patients against some 60 police officers with a water cannon when the doorman, in charge of the Order of Physicians, wanted to charge the furniture in 1984. He gained his seat and became legislature member of the European Parliament (1984–1989). In 1986 he joined the first row, with the miners from Waterschei to Winterslag. He formed the strike leadership together with miners Luc Cieters, Jan Grouwels, Antonio Venturo, Antonio De Simone, Franco Mirisola and Harrie Dewitte. After his election to the European Parliament, he was no longer on the SP list. From January 1992 to the end of 1994, Ulburghs concurrently served as a member of the Flemish Parliament. In 1995 he retired from active politics.

== Later life ==
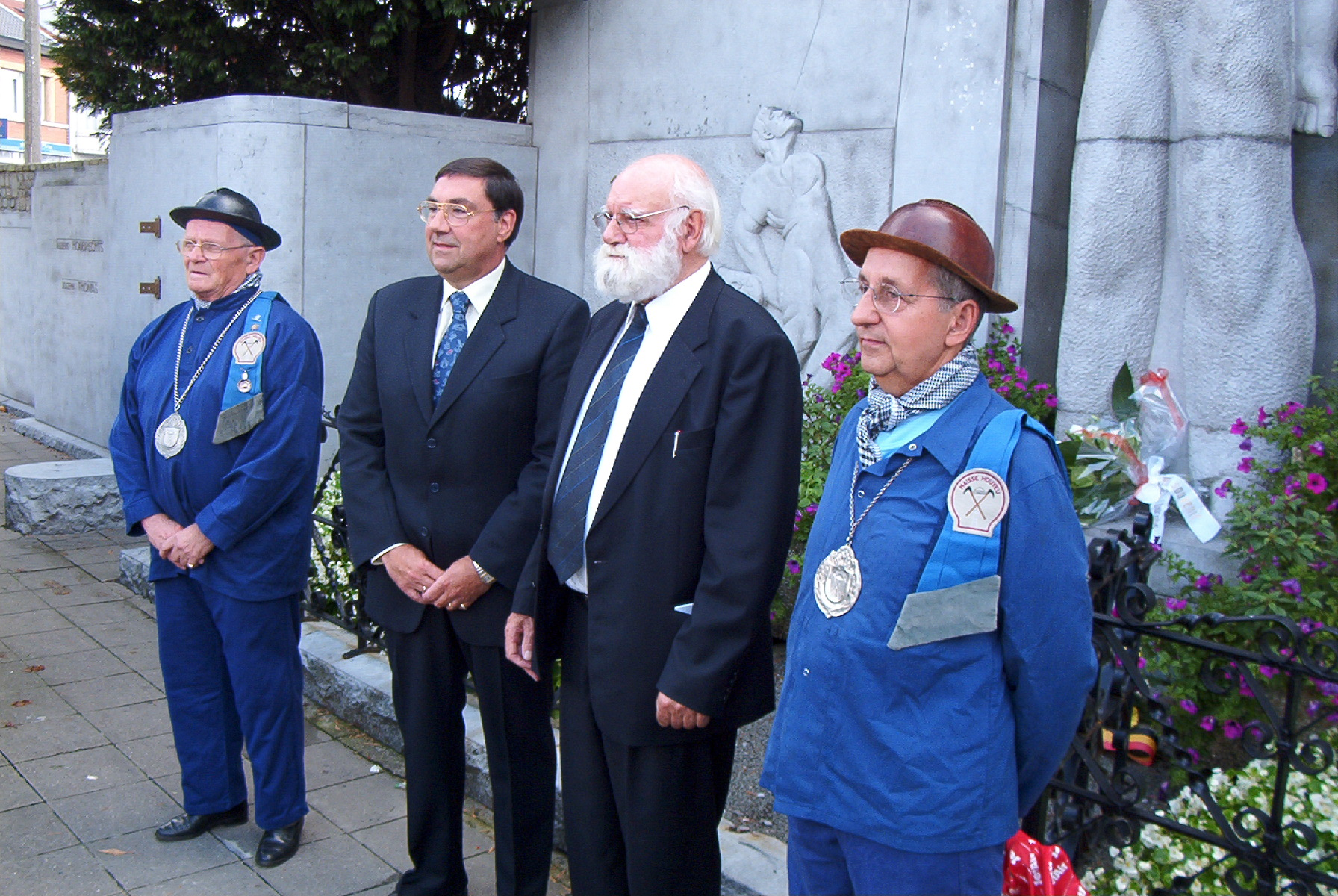
Jef Ulburghs honored by Walloon miners.

In 2002, Ulburghs eightieth birthday was celebrated in the former mine of Zolder. On August 25, 2002, he was appointed as an honorary citizen in Grâce-Hollogne In 2005, at the age of 83, Ulburghs obtained another doctorate in Political Science. After a short illness Ulburghs died in 2010.

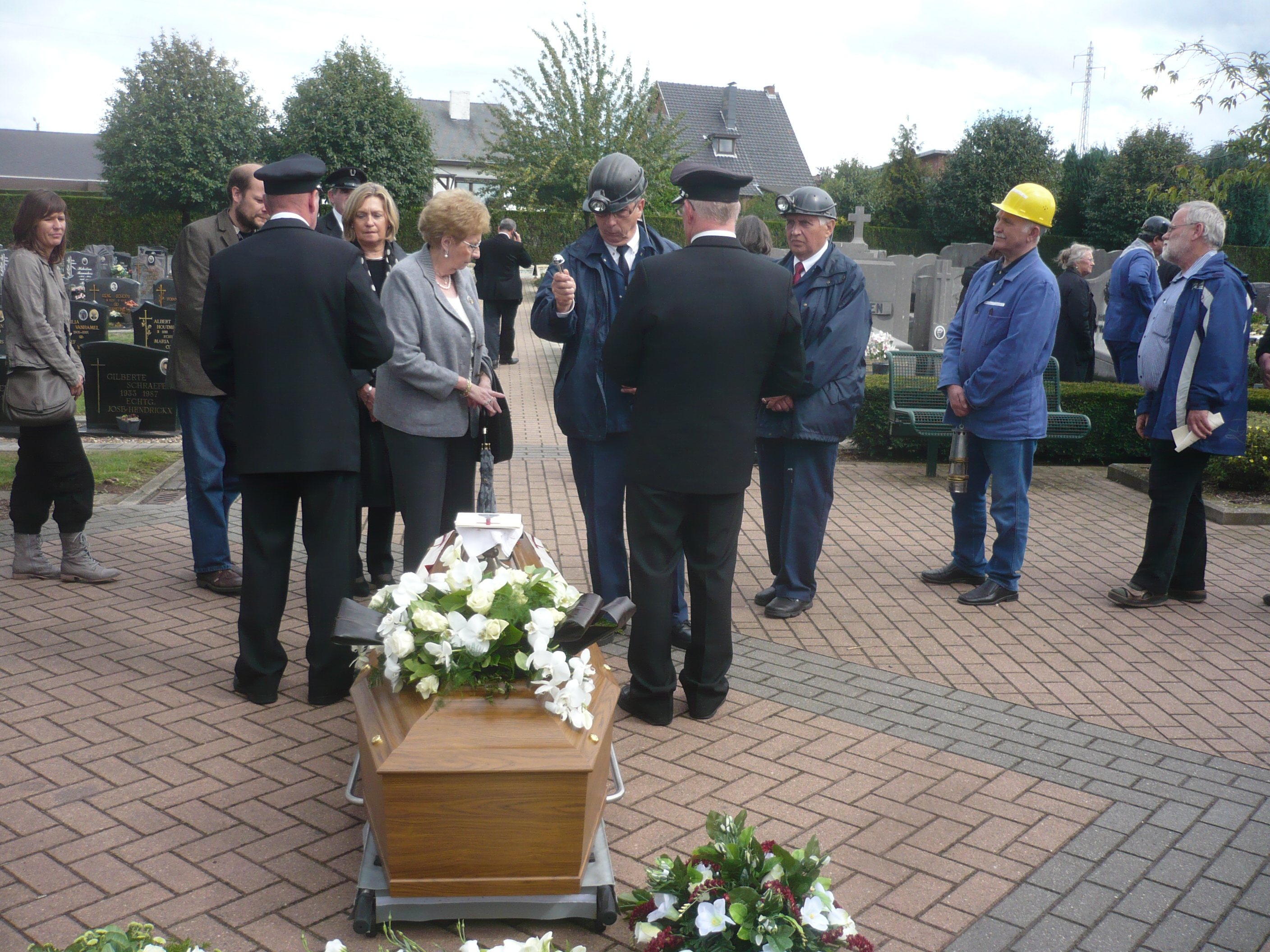
Former miners paying their last respects

== Works ==
- 1973 – Wegen naar bevrijding (with Frans Swartelé), publisher De Nederlandsche Boekhandel, Kapellen, ISBN 90 289 9887 X
- 1974 – Pédagogie de la libération
- 1977 – De pedagogie van het basis-socialisme
- 1978 – Wegen naar zelfbeheer, publisher Kritak, Leuven, ISBN 90 6303 019 3
- 1979 – Pour une pédagogie de l'autogestion. Manuel de l'animateur de base, publisher Les Éditions Ouvrières, Paris, ISBN 2 87003 143 2
- 1985 – Leven tussen twee vuren, publisher Kritak, Leuven, ISBN 90 6303 139 4
- 1987 – Doorbreken! Het historisch misverstand
- 1989 – De zuilen van de tempel, publisher BOEK, Zonhoven, ISBN 90 5232 025 X
- 1996 – De eeuwige rebel, publisher Scoop, Groot-Bijgaarden, ISBN 90 5312 062 9
- 2000 – Kosova, van waanzinnige oorlog tot onmogelijke verzoening, dagboek van een bewogen reis, publisher Europa-Huis v.z.w., Genk (geen ISBN)
- 2000 – Etapes, publisher Wolters Plantyn, Deurne
- 2004 – Culturen zonder muren, publisher Concentra Media, Hasselt, ISBN 90 76322 45 7.
  Over het Limburgse integratieproces. Aan de hand van 90 gesprekken worden de maatschappelijke en sociale context van het mijngebeuren en de wisselwerking tussen politiek, godsdienst en integratie geschetst.
- 2004 – Le principe de subsidiarité dans l'unification de l'Europe, uitg. UCL
- 2006 – De Kluis van Bolderberg en haar geheimen, publisher Stichting Jef Ulburghs – Europahuis, Genk, ISBN 90 78190 39 6.
  De opbrengst (4.000 euro) ging naar de verdere restauratie van de Kluis van Bolderberg.
- 2007 – De Europese Droom. Subsidiariteit het geheim van het Europese succes, publisher Stichting Jef Ulburghs – Europahuis, Genk, ISBN 978 90 8861051 6

== External Sources ==
- Jef Ulburghs in ODIS - Online Database for Intermediary Structures
- Archives of Jef Ulburghs in ODIS - Online Database for Intermediary Structures
