= Brecht Abbey =

Trappist abbey in Belgium

Coordinates: 51°18′59″N 4°37′57″E

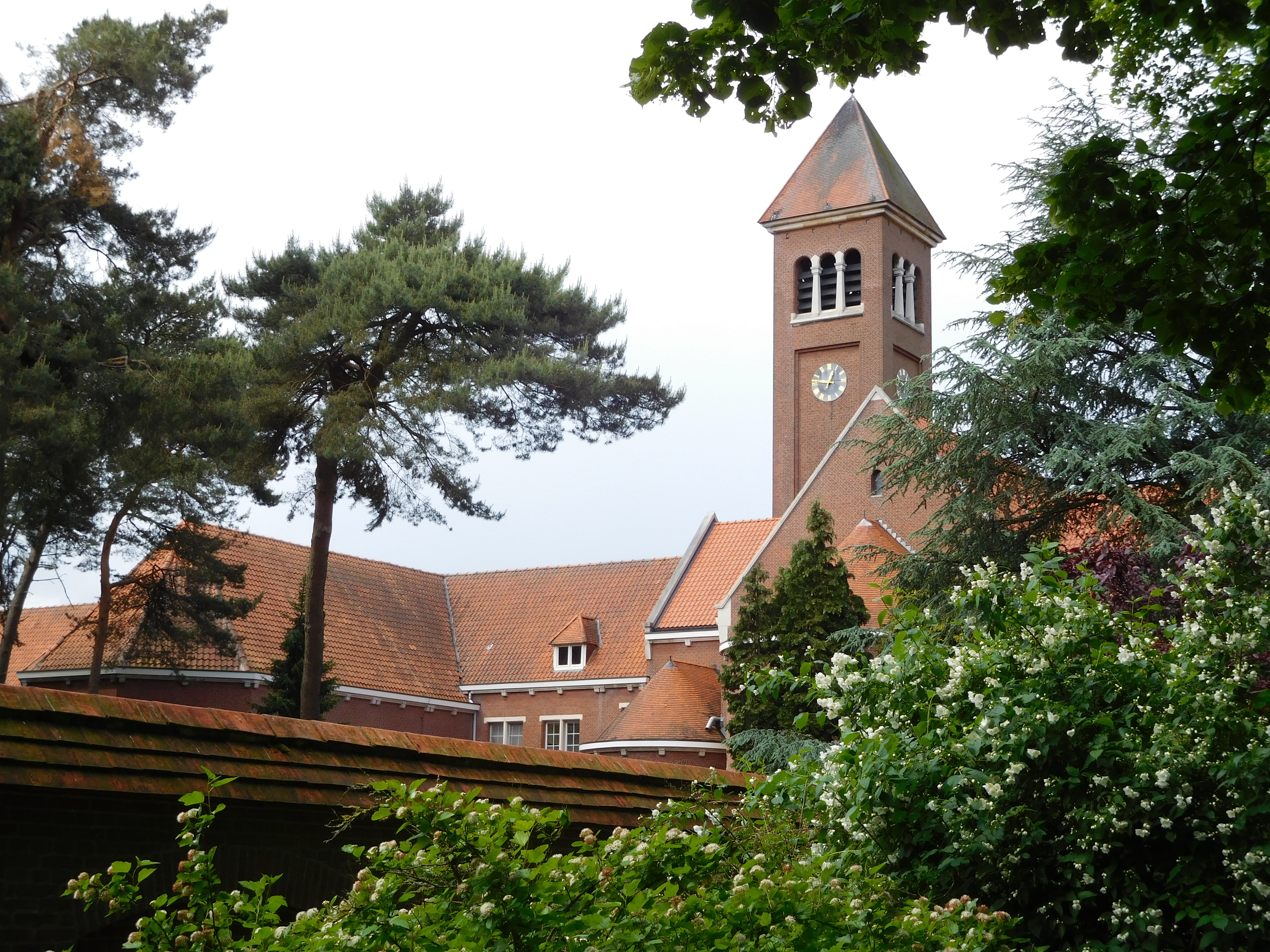
Brecht Abbey

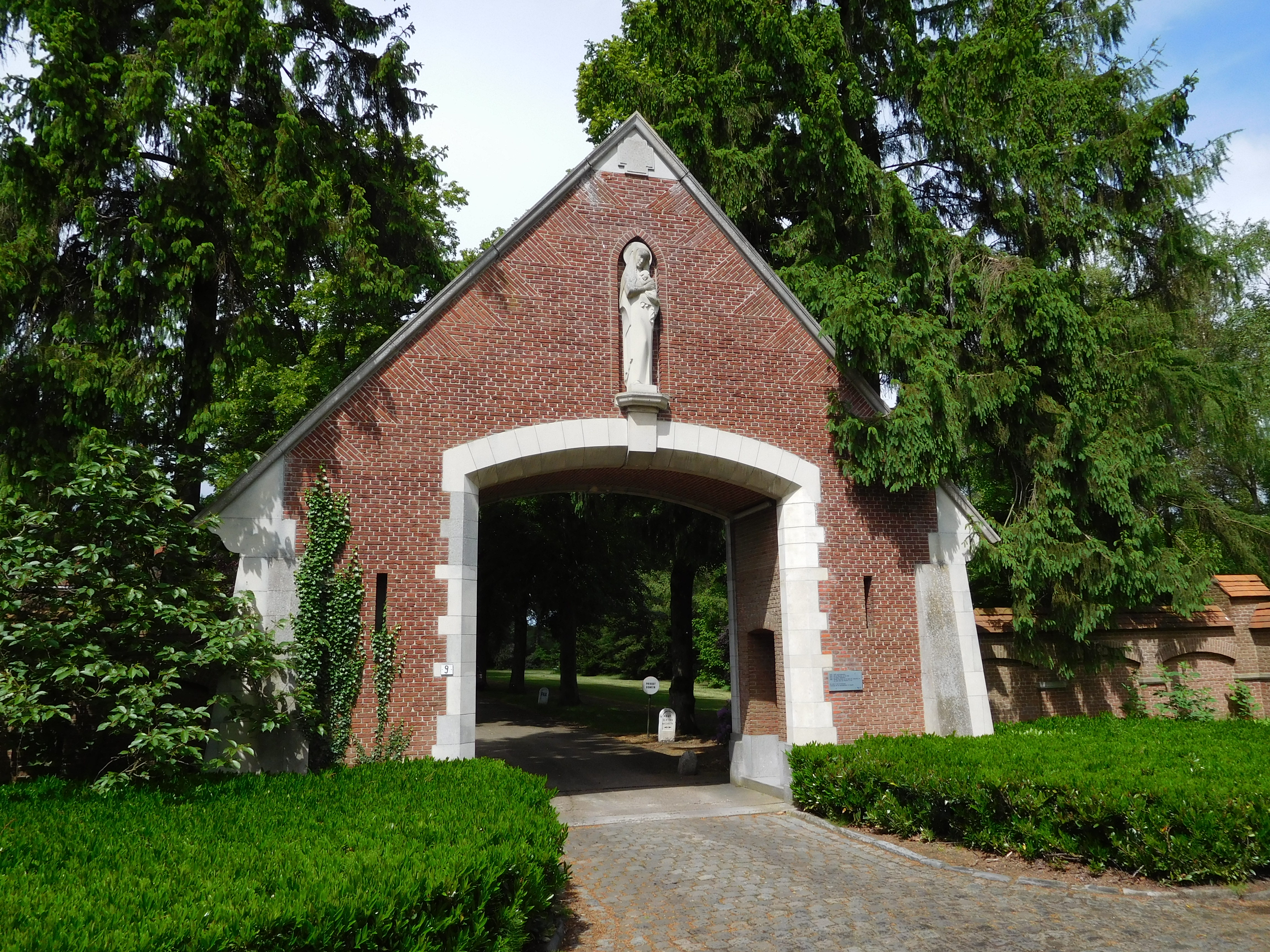
The abbey gateway

Brecht Abbey, also known as the Abbey of Our Lady of Nazareth, is an abbey of Trappistine nuns located in Brecht, in the Campine region of the province of Antwerp (Flanders, Belgium). Life in the abbey is characterized by prayer, reading and manual work, the three basic elements of Trappist life.

== Early history ==
In 1235, Bartholomeus van Tienen and his son Wicbert moved to Lier to establish a third Cistercian nunnery after Bloemendaal (around 1210) and Maagdendaal (1221). In May 1236 his daughters Christina, Sybilla and Beatrijs followed, who had also initially entered Bloemendaal. Blessed Beatrice (1200–1268) was its first prioress. In 1245, the sisters asked the General Chapter for permission to move the convent. Two years later this is also a fact and the sisters move into a new convent north of the town of Lier on the location known as 'Nazareth'.

For five centuries the abbey flourished, until 1797, when it was closed in the aftermath of the French Revolution, when the French Revolutionary Army occupied the Austrian Netherlands. The abbey did not recover from the closure even after the Belgian Revolution in 1830, when Belgium gained independence from the United Kingdom of the Netherlands.

== Modern history ==
In the early 20th century several attempts were made to re-establish the abbey at different locations. During World War II in 1943, Henri van Ostayen was in favor of locating the new abbey in Brecht, of which he was burgomaster, but was killed in Antwerp by a V-1 flying bomb before the end of the war. His proposal was however taken up by Dom Robertus (Edward Jozef Modest) Eyckmans, Abbot of the nearby Trappist Westmalle Abbey. He was able to obtain the agreement of Soleilmont Abbey to provide the 12 nuns necessary to settle a new foundation. On 12 October 1945 the organization for founding a new abbey was established, and in 1946 about 16 hectares of land were acquired in Brecht for the new building, as the old site in Lier was no longer available. The monks of Westmalle Abbey prepared the site of the nuns' monastery, which was ready by the end of 1949.

Thirteen Trappistine nuns left Soleilmont and headed for Brecht on 23 June 1950: Abbess Agnes Swevers with Sisters Lucia Delaere, Heleen Steylaers, Humbelina Roelandts, Idesbalda van Soest, Lutgard Smeets, Maria Marlier, Petra Belet, Juliana Rutten, Harlindis Gerits, Roberta Koeken, Alberica Hauchecorne, and novice Roza van den Bosch. The monastery was formally opened on 25 June 1950, and on 3 February 1951 it was raised to the status of an independent abbey. The church was dedicated on 22 October 1954.

Brecht Abbey went on to found Our Lady of the Redwoods Abbey in 1962 in Whitethorn, California, the United States, then in 1970 the Priory of Our Lady of Klaarland in Bocholt, Belgium.

== Products ==
The nuns in the abbey produce several products under the International Trappist Association seal. Starting in 1964, they began to market dishwashing detergent, and subsequently expanded to other cleaning products, cosmetics, and liturgical objects, as well as hand-crafted banners and flags.

Our Lady of Nazareth is one of five Trappist monasteries connected by a cycling route ("Sample the 5 Trappists!") through Flanders and Brabant.

== Sources ==
- Van Remoortere, J., 1990: Ippa's Abdijengids voor Belgie (pp. 72–75). Lannoo
- Cassianus, J., 1985: Brecht, Abdij Nazareth
