= Beatrice of Nazareth =

Flemish Cistercian nun (c. 1200–1268)

Blessed Beatrice of Nazareth
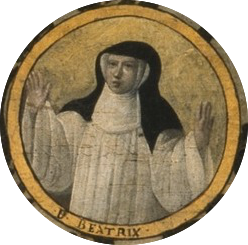
- Born: c. 1200; Tienen, Brabant, Holy Roman Empire
- Died: 29 July 1268; Lier, Brabant, Holy Roman Empire
- Venerated in: Catholic Church
- Feast: 29 July
- Major works: Seven Ways of Holy Love

Beatrice of Nazareth (Dutch: Beatrijs van Nazareth; c. 1200 – 1268), also known as Beatrice of Tienen, was a Flemish Cistercian nun, visionary and mystic. Remembered chiefly through a medieval adaptation of her writings, of which the originals are now mostly lost, she is venerated as Blessed by the Catholic Church.

Beatrice's treatise Seven Ways of Holy Love is an early example of bridal mysticism. Long surviving only in Latin adaptation, it was rediscovered in 1926, making it the earliest surviving work of mystical prose in Middle Dutch.

== Biography ==
Beatrice was born in Tienen in the Duchy of Brabant, part of the Holy Roman Empire, located in today's Belgium. She was the youngest of six children in a wealthy bourgeois family. When Beatrice was seven, her mother, Gertrudis, died; her father, Barthelomeus Lanio, sent her to the Beguines in nearby Zoutleeuw, where she attended the local school. Beatrice remained there for a little over a year before her father brought her home. Not long after, he sent her to become an oblate at a Cistercian convent he had founded called Bloemendael in Eerken, where she received an education in the liberal arts, as well as Latin and calligraphy.

At the age of fifteen, Beatrice asked to be allowed to enter the novitiate; after being put off for a year due to her young age and delicate health, she was admitted as a novice in 1216. From 1216 to 1218, Beatrice studied manuscript production at La Ramée Abbey. There she met Ida of Nivelles, who became her close friend and spiritual advisor; the two may have continued to correspond until Ida's death in 1231.

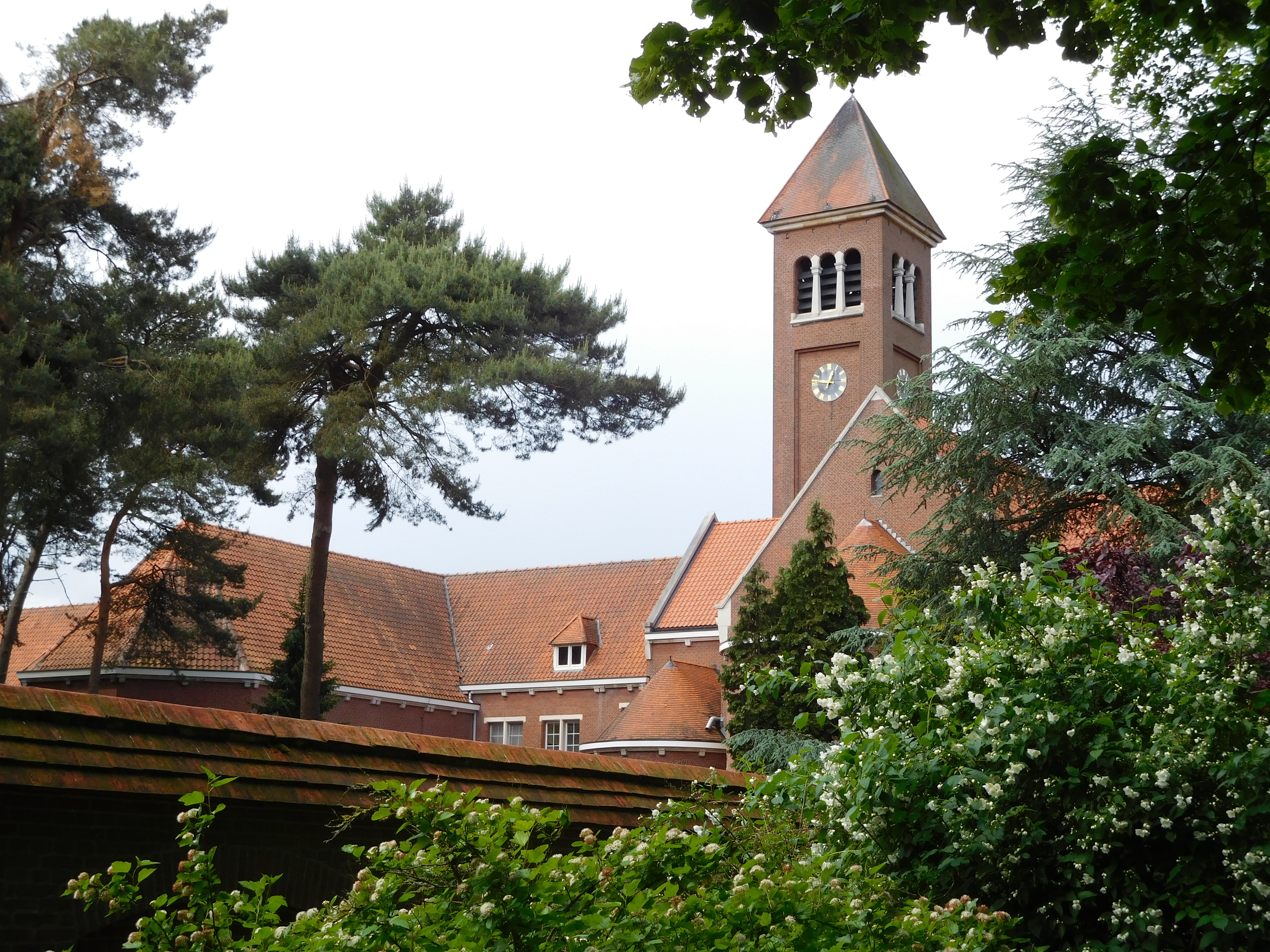
The present-day Abbey of Our Lady of Nazareth, where Beatrice once held the office of prioress.

In 1218, Beatrice became one of the founding members of Maagdendaal Abbey, where she remained for three years. She returned in 1221 to Bloemendaal, where her father and her brother Wickbert had meanwhile become lay brothers. Beatrice took her permanent vows in 1225. In 1235, she left to join the Abbey of Our Lady of Nazareth, also founded by her father. A number of other nuns accompanied her, including her sisters Christina and Sybilla. Beatrice was elected the first prioress of Nazareth the following year, and held the post until her death in 1268.

According to one legend, after Nazareth was abandoned during a time of disturbance, the body of Beatrice was translated by angels to the city of Lier. Beatrice is known as Blessed within the Catholic church, with a feast day on 29 July.

== Spirituality ==
Beatrice is associated with the mulieres religiosae, an emerging thirteenth-century group of European women with their own distinctive set of devotional and mystical practices.

Beatrice's medieval biographer describes her as practicing intense mortification of the flesh: wearing a girdle of thorns, self-flagellation, sleeping on stones, and walking barefoot in the snow. However, modern commentators argue that Beatrice's biographer, who is known to have taken liberties in his adaptation of her diaries, may have simply copied these ascetic practices from the life of Arnulf of Leuven. His accounts of her childhood may be particularly suspect, since the autobiographical notes on which he based the biography do not begin until age fifteen.

A central topic of Beatrice's spirituality was the Holy Trinity, a topic on which she read extensively, including Augustine's De Trinitate. Her first vision, experienced in 1217 while meditating on her psalter, was of the Trinity. She had a number of subsequent Trinitarian visions, and expressed constant longing to be freed from her body and united with the Trinity. Eucharistic devotion was also important to Beatrice's spiritual practices, and her medieval biographer describes the intensity of her devotion as resulting in bleeding and physical collapse.

For much of her life, especially in 1217 and 1228–1231, Beatrice suffered from intermittent periods of depression and torpor, which some modern commentators have suggested might reflect bipolar disorder. She was brought relief by various spiritual experiences, describing incidents in which her spirit was elevated and Christ embraced her or spoke comforting words to her. In 1231, Beatrice experienced a vision in which she was united with the Seraphim, and heard Christ promise her that she would never suffer to the point of wishing for death.

== Works ==
Beatrice is known to have produced a number of autobiographical and spiritual writings in her native Middle Dutch. Most of these survive only by way of the Vita Beatricis, composed within a few years of Beatrice's death by an anonymous hagiographer. Some historians speculate that this writer may have been Willem of Afflighem, but others reject this identification as based on a misinterpretation. The Vita, written in Latin, is based on a combination of these writings and eyewitness testimony, including that of Beatrice's sister Christina. The biographer admits to omitting some parts of Beatrice's writing, and altering others. Some historians speculate that both these alterations, and the destruction of Beatrice's original works, may have been intended to avoid suspicion from inquisitors, such as Robert le Bougre.

=== Seven Ways of Holy Love ===
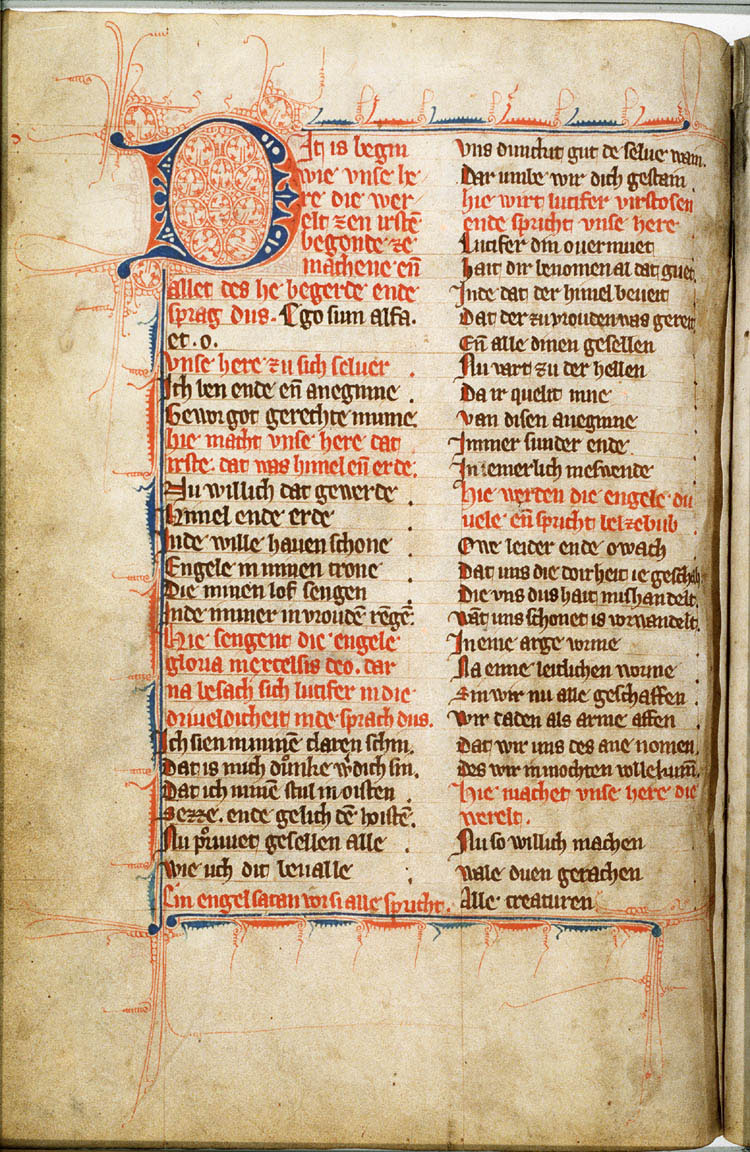
An illuminated page from the Limburg Sermons, a manuscript that also contained a Middle Dutch version of Beatrice's Seven Ways of Holy Love.

Beatrice's most famous work is her Seven Ways of Holy Love (Dutch: Seven Manieren van Heiliger Minnen). This treatise was preserved anonymously in the Limburg Sermons, and known for its influence on mysticism in Brabant and the Rhinelands. Its authorship was not determined until 1926, when historian Léonce Reypens identified it with the Latin translation in Beatrice's biography, De caritate dei et septem eius gradibus. This identification has subsequently been widely accepted by academics, although historian Wybren Scheepsma has questioned its reliability.

Unusual among spiritual texts of the day for being written in the vernacular instead of Latin, the Seven Ways has been the focus of much of the modern scholarship on Beatrice. It is the best-known among the Limburg Sermons, and Scheepsma describes it as "a classic of medieval (female) mysticism". The treatise describes seven forms or manners of love:

1. purifying love
2. disinterested love
3. painful cravings for love
4. absorbing love
5. stormy love
6. triumphant love
7. eternal love

Beatrice compares the soul, in its relationship to God, first to a bride, then to a housewife. Commenters have described the work's prose style as simple, balanced, lyrical, and experiential. Reypens praises it as "a hidden pearl of mysticism", while Scheepsma calls it "the most splendid of all the Limburg sermons."

Beatrice's focus on love ("minne") as a central point of her mysticism may have been influenced both by her contemporary Hadewijch, and by the growing German tradition of Minnesang. Her Seven Ways also draws heavily on works such as Bernard of Clairvaux's De diligendo Deo and Richard of Saint Victor's De quattor gradibus violentae caritatis. In turn, Beatrice's writings contributed to the emerging "bridal mysticism" movement; her influence on later mystics in that tradition is visible in Marguerite Porete's The Mirror of Simple Souls, which parallels and draws from the Seven Ways.

=== Lost works ===
In addition to the Seven Ways of Holy Love, Beatrice wrote a number of other spiritual treatises. These are now lost; some references to them survive in her biography. They included:

- De frequentatione et exercitio temporis ("On the intensive use of time")
- De triplici exercitio spiritualium affectuum ("On the threefold exercise of spiritual affections")
- De duabus cellis quas in corde suo constituit ("On the two cells which she constructed in her heart")
- De quinque speculis cordis sui ("On the five mirrors of her own heart")
- De monasterio spirituali ("On the spiritual convent")
- De orto fructifero cordis suo ("On the fruitful garden of her own heart")
- De eo quod ad cognitionem sui ipsius omnimodam aspiravit ("On her aspiration to achieve self-knowledge")
- De quadam ordinatione vitae spiritualis quam aliquanto tempore exercuit ("On a certain rule of spiritual life which she kept for some time")

Beatrice additionally composed two prayers: "O Domine juste" (Oh, righteous Lord) and "O justissime, O potentissime Deus" (Oh, most righteous and almighty God).
