= Soleilmont Abbey =

Church building in Gilly, Belgium

Coordinates: 50°26′42.73″N 4°30′19.62″E

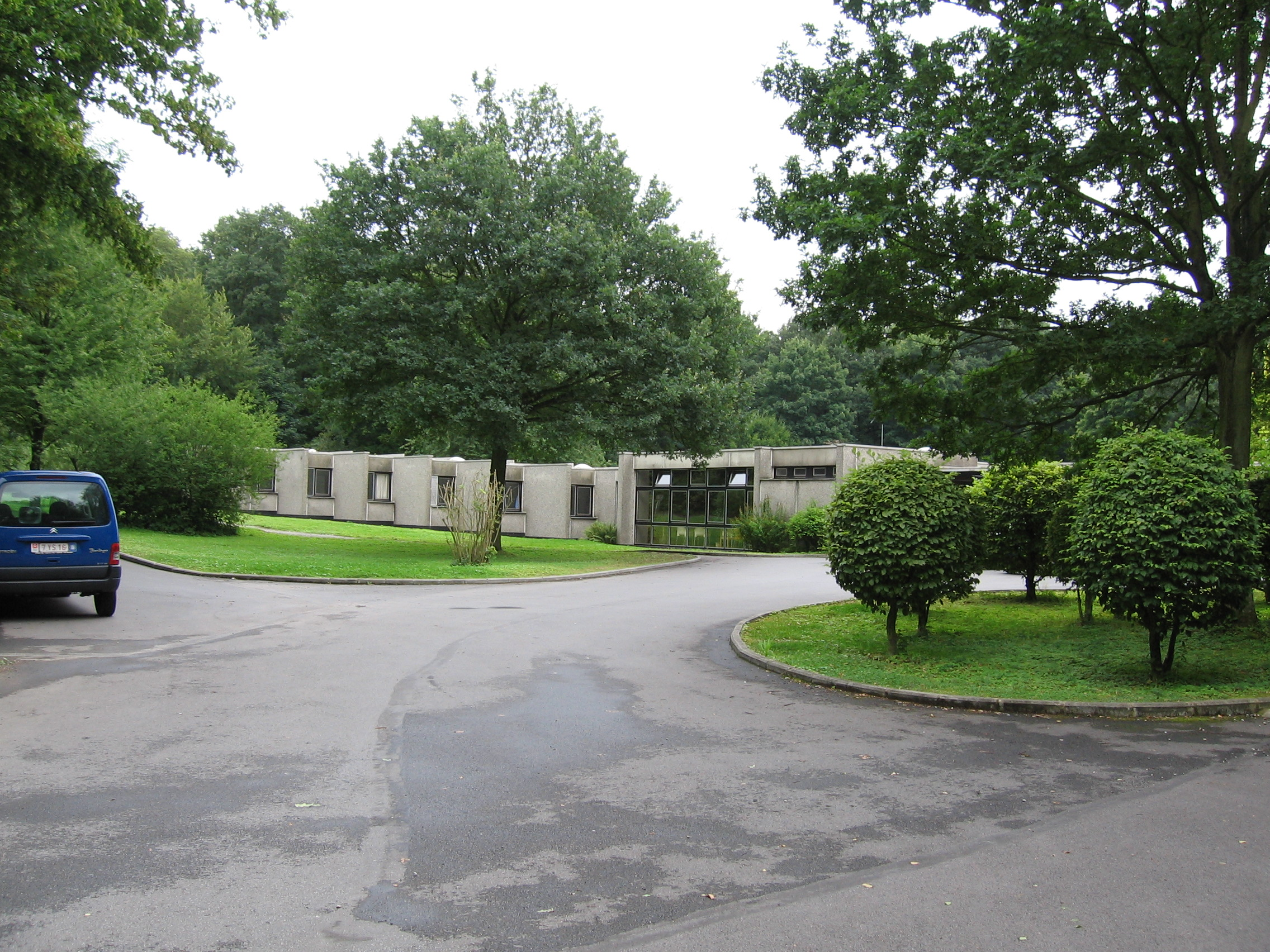
Soleilmont abbey was rebuilt in 1973, after being destroyed by a fire, in the forest of Soleilmont (Gilly, Belgium).

Soleilmont Abbey (French: Abbaye Notre-Dame de Soleilmont) is an abbey of Trappistine nuns (O.C.S.O., or Order of Cistercians of the Strict Observance) situated in the forest and commune of Fleurus, at Gilly near Charleroi, Belgium, founded, according to tradition, in the 11th century, which became Cistercian in 1237. The nuns were expelled as a consequence of the French Revolution in 1796, but soon re-established themselves in 1802. The community became Bernardine in 1837, and Trappist in 1919.

== History ==
=== Foundation ===
According to the foundation tradition, of which there is no confirmation, Soleilmont Abbey was founded in 1088 by Albert III, Count of Namur, and the earliest community supposedly consisted of women whose husbands had joined Godfrey of Bouillon on the First Crusade. It was possibly founded as a Benedictine monastery, but the women might simply have lived as secular canonesses and thus been free to resume their married lives, upon the safe return of their husbands. The first recorded reference to a religious house here, however, is in a charter of 1185.

=== Cistercians ===
In a document dated 11 January 1237, Baldwin II of Courtenay, Count of Namur, requested that the Cistercian Order accept Soleilmont Abbey, which they duly did, as a dependency of Aulne Abbey. On 23 March 1238 Pope Gregory IX placed the abbey under papal protection, and, at the same time, confirmed the deed of transfer of the abbey to the Cistercians.

To support his request Baldwin confirmed the gift made by his mother, Yolande of Hainaut, to the abbey of a fishpond, a mill and a meadow, and although some further gifts later increased the monastic endowments, the abbey never became wealthy. On account of their lack of resources the nuns were exempted in 1640, for example, from their dues to the Cistercian Order, and their poverty was often mentioned in the assessments of goods that were customarily made at the elections of an abbess.

Soleilmont was affected by the general decadence of monastic life that took place throughout the 14th century, to the extent that by 1414 it had been decided that the only option was to close the monastery. As a final resort before closure, however, a new abbess, Marie de Senzeille, was sent to Soleilmont from Marche-les-Dames Abbey, another monastery in the County of Namur, to attempt to re-establish order, which she did so successfully that Soleilmont was not only reprieved but became a model for other communities of nuns in the monastic revival of the 15th century.

The 15th century Margot of Hainaut, celebrated for her abilities as a player of jeu de paume, a precursor of tennis, spent her later years as a nun in Soleilmont.

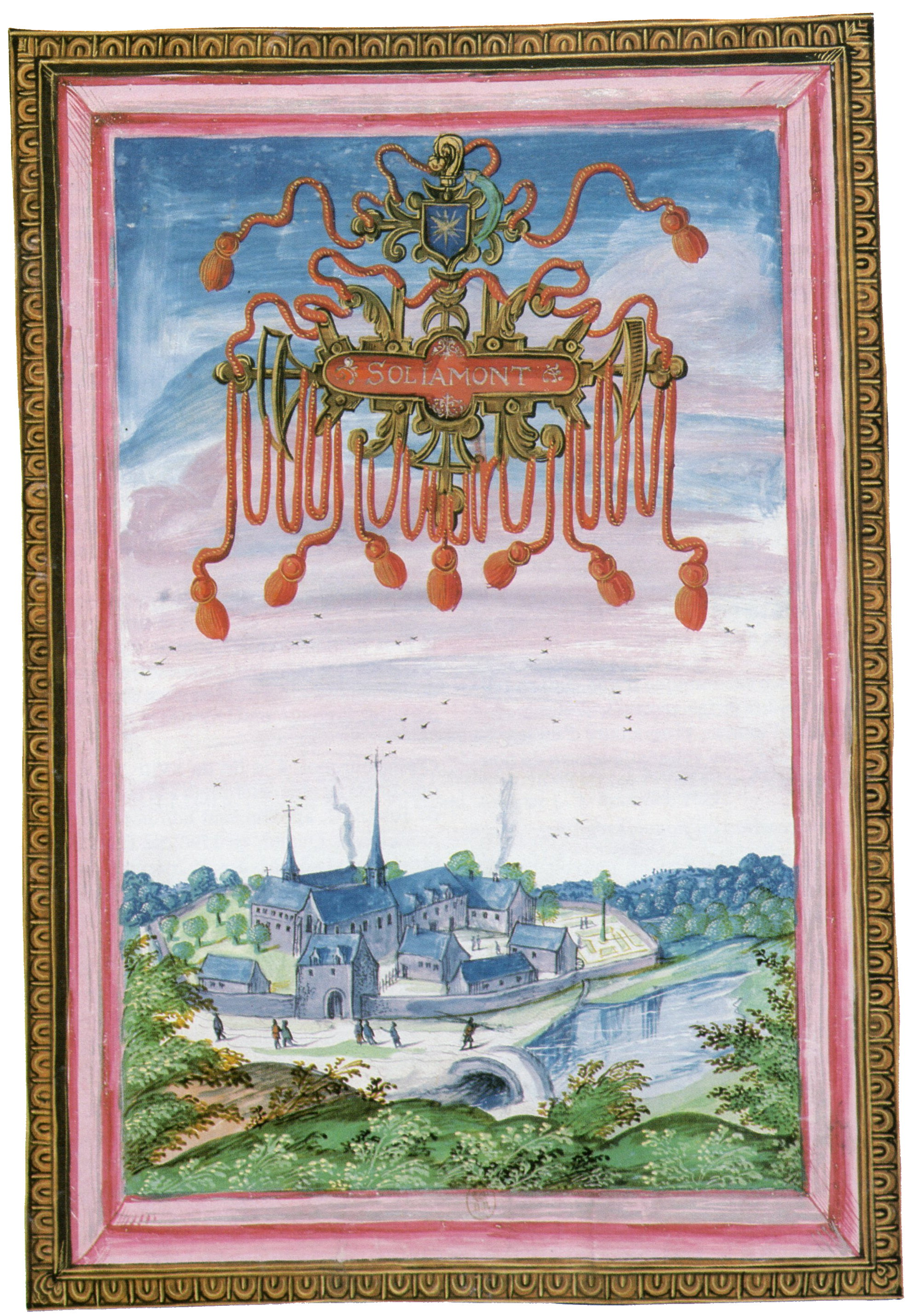
Abbaye Notre-Dame de Soleilmont à Gilly (1604). Albums de Croÿ, Bibliothèque Nationale, Paris.

Prominent abbesses of the 16th century were Oda de Virsel and Madeleine Bulteau (resigned 1603), whose successor, Jacqueline Colnet (d. 1639), was a friend of Albert VII, Archduke of Austria and his consort, the Infanta Isabel of Spain, to whom she gave, from the relics of the abbey, a Holy Nail. She was principally remembered in the region however for twice ending attacks of the Black Death in the town of Châtelet, in 1628 and again in 1636, by having the abbey's famous image of Our Lady of Rome carried through the streets.

During the wars later in the 17th century, the nuns of Soleilmont, as a poor community of unprotected women, suffered particularly from harassment and theft by the soldiery.

=== French Revolution ===
In 1775, Scholastique Daivier (d. 1805) succeeded as abbess, the last abbess of the ancien régime. In 1790, fearing the arrival of the revolutionary armies, she moved the community from Soleilmont, along with the abbey's relics and the image of Our Lady of Rome, first to La Ramée Abbey and later to Liège. However, in the belief that they had moved for no good reason, they then returned to Soleilmont in 1794, just in time to be caught up in the Battle of Fleurus of 26 June 1794, which was fought literally beneath the abbey walls.

In January 1797 the nuns were expelled from the abbey, but were given the use of a château at Farciennes by its owner, and were thus enabled to remain together as a community. Their benefactor also kept watch over the fate of the abbey buildings, which were nevertheless looted and burnt, and he acquired them on behalf of the community, who were thus able to return to them, as tenants, in 1802.

=== Bernardines ===
The next three decades were very difficult times: the community was penniless, demoralized and aging, and soon numbered only four. In 1837, however, with the help of the Cistercian nuns of Mariënlof Abbey at Borgloon, they were able to buy back the premises, and, in order to generate income, opened a girls' boarding school. At the same time, under the influence of the nearby Aumôniers du Travail, they became a Bernardine community. This was a new dawn for Soleilmont, both spiritually and economically: they attracted many new vocations, and were able to refurbish and reconstruct the abbey buildings. The times of plenty continued up to World War I, during which, in 1916, the school had to close.

=== Trappistines ===
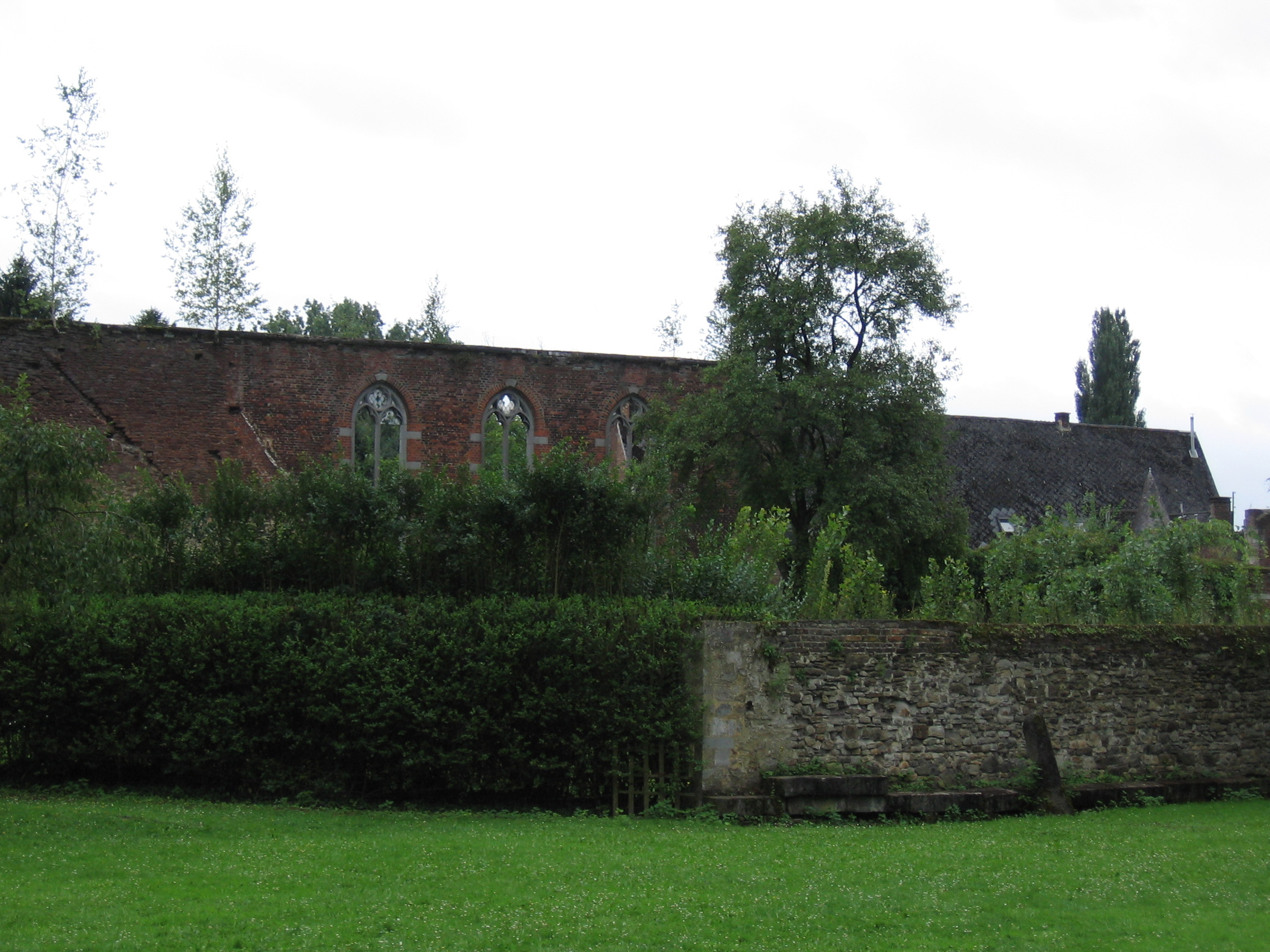
Ruins of Soleilmont abbey church, destroyed in a 1963 fire.

In 1919 the remaining nuns returned to the mainstream Cistercian mode of life, and were incorporated into the Trappist Order in 1922, under the supervision of Westmalle Abbey, as their original supervisory community of monks, Aulne Abbey, had ceased to function. Under this new direction Soleilmont again flourished, to the extent that in 1950 they were able to provide the 13 nuns needed to establish the new foundation of Brecht Abbey.

On Christmas Eve 1963 the abbey was completely burnt down, just after the night offices. A completely new monastery was built a few hundred yards from the ruins of the old one, in the woods of Soleilmont, in a totally modern style, which was finished in 1973.

== Today ==
The present community of about thirty run a farm and a bakery, and make liturgical vestments. A dozen or so rooms are available in their guesthouse for the accommodation of women on retreat.

Every year, on the last Sunday of August, the image of Our Lady of Rome is carried in procession round Châtelineau nearby in memory of the protection received by that town in 1628 and 1636 against the outbreaks of the plague.

Soleilmont Abbey has a daughter foundation in Kerala, India.

== Sources ==
- Fleurus: Soleilmont (in French)
- Philagodu.be: brief history of Soleilmont Abbey (in French)
- Photographs of Soleilmont Abbey (in French)
- OCSO official directory: Soleilmont Abbey, Fleurus
