= Zwartberg =

- Civil Parish
- Coordinates: 51°00′00″N 5°30′00″E
- Country: Belgium
- Province: Limburg
- City: Genk

Population
  - Total: 3,785
- Time zone: UTC0 (WET)
  - Summer (DST): UTC+1 (WEST)

Zwartberg (Black mountain) is a parish, founded on 3 December 1926 in a district of Genk in the Belgian province Limburg.

== Coalmine ==
Zwartberg was the seat of the nearby coal mine of the same name, until it closed in 1966.

== Riots ==
On Monday, January 31, 1966, a group of miners from Zwartberg went to the mines at Waterschei to rally their colleagues for a strike against the closing of the mine of Zwartberg. A small group of members of the Rijkswacht (Gendarmerie) was waiting for them when they arrived at the entrance to the Waterschei mine, which was quickly surrounded by the miners. They also stopped a truck, loaded with wood for the mines, and forced the driver to leave his cargo behind.

Armed with blocks of wood and other debris, the miners threw projectiles at the Rijkswacht, who at first responded by firing into the air as a warning. When the rioters refused to back down, the commanding officer ordered his men to open fire on the group, which resulted in the death of Jan Latos by several bullets in his back. Later that day, Valère Sclep died after being hit by a teargas grenade.

News of the tragedy spread rapidly and the government decided to withdraw the Rijkswacht officers and replace them with the Para-commandos. The riots lasted another three days, until an agreement was signed by the management and the unions on 3 February.
