= St. Peter in Chains Church (Beringen) =

Coordinates: 51.0484°N 5.2249°E

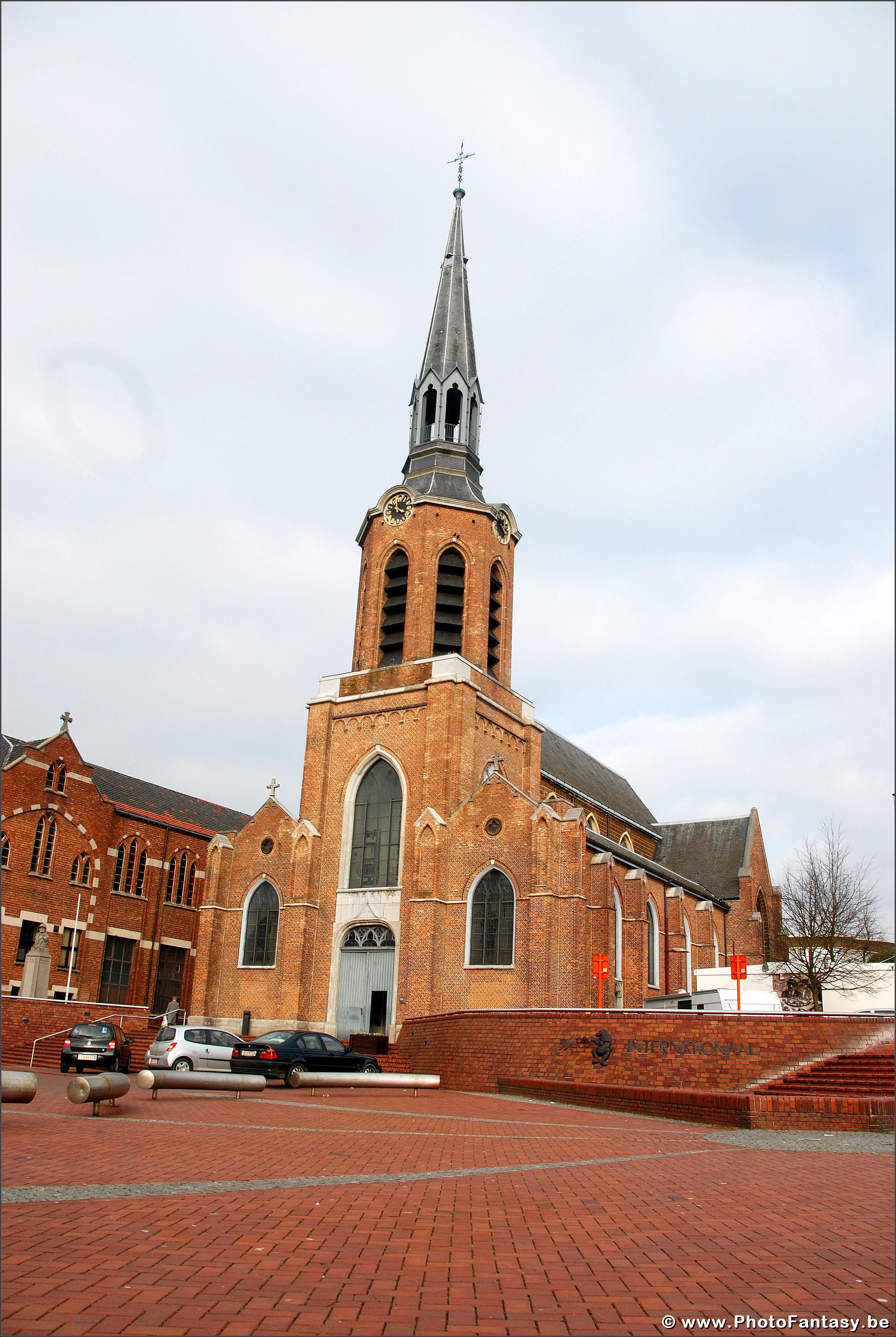
The St. Peter in Chains Church in Beringen centre

The St. Peter in Chains Church (Dutch: Sint-Pietersbandenkerk) is a church in neo-Gothic style with a rich Baroque interior located at the Market Square in Beringen, Belgium. It is the parish church of Beringen centre and the decanal church of the deanery of Beringen. The chancel, nave and transept are protected since 1949 and the neo-Gothic parts since 1993.

== History ==
The church is a cruciform basilica with a western tower. The original church was destroyed in 1467 by Burgundian troops. A new church was built and subsequently devastated by fire in 1584 during the Eighty Years' War. The church was restored in 1592. The church was again destroyed in 1654, this time by Lorraine troops. The church was rebuilt and deacon Adriaen Wuestenraed played a major role in this reconstruction. In 1695 the church and the interior were completed. The interior was executed in Baroque style.

The church tower collapsed in 1838 causing heavy damage to the nave and aisles. The reconstruction was carried out from 1842 to 1844. The aisles were restored in the then popular neo-Gothic style, and a new west tower with a striking, slender spire was built. A thorough restoration of the building and interior was conducted from 1998.

== Exterior ==
The transept, the vestries and the choir date from the 16th century. The vestiges of iron sandstone in the present church are from the earlier church that was built in late Demer Gothic style, a local variation of the Brabantine Gothic. The neo-Gothic parts of the church are in brick and limestone. The choir still has the original pointed arch windows.

== Interior ==
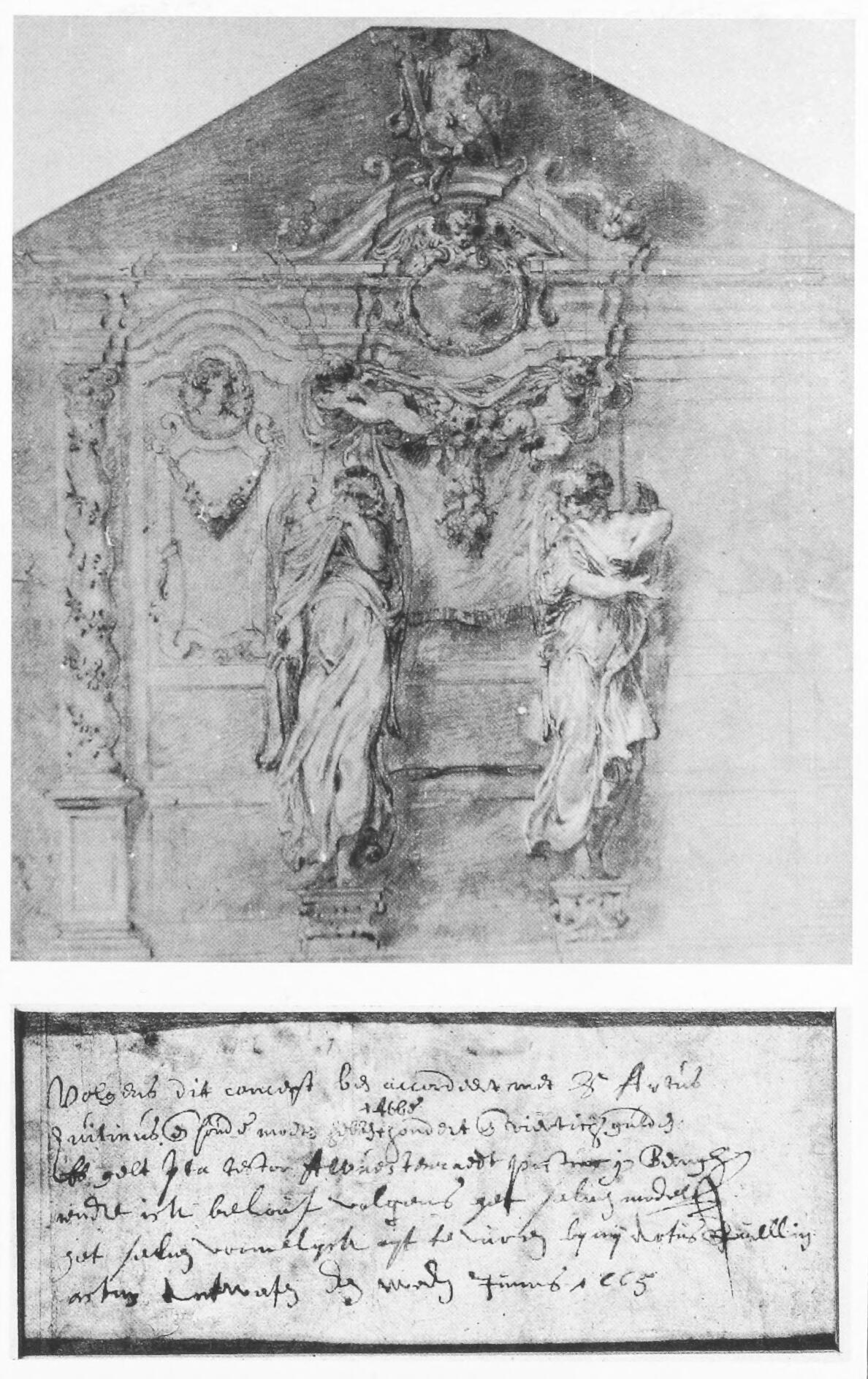
Design of confessional in the northern transept by Artus Quellinus II

The Baroque paneling, altars and at least three of the confessionals were produced by cabinetmaker Tillman Janssens and the sculptor Daniël van Vlierden from Hasselt. Three of the four confessionals can be attributed with certainty to van Vlierden on the basis of stylistic similarities with the confessionals that he made for the Dominican church in Maastricht (now in the Basilica of Saint Servatius). The facial expressions and the arrangement of the figures point in the direction of van Vlierden. One confessional in the northern transept is probably the work of the eminent Antwerp sculptor Artus Quellinus II, given the similarity with the design drawn by Artus Quellinus II himself. The sculpture of the Holy Sepulchre in the northern aisle of the church can also be attributed with certainty to van Vlierden. The main altar displays certain characteristics of van Vlierden’s expressive forms. However, it can not be attributed to him with certainty. The execution of the pulpit is certainly the work of another, less skilled sculptor.

The communion rails and part of the choir stalls were made by Laurens Vandenreyt (or Vandereyt) and date from the late 17th century. Jan Rutten from Sint-Truiden completed the stalls after the death of Laurens Vandenreyt. The Baroque high altar contains a painting representing Christ on the cross attributed to the Antwerp painter Erasmus Quellinus II.

The side altars are portico altars and contain the Baroque paintings Assumption and Coronation of Mary and the Finding of the Cross, both by Anton Goubau.

The rood screen is neogothic. The organ was manufactured in 1853 by Henri Vermeersch from Duffel and is the largest organ built by Vermeersch in Belgium. It was thoroughly restored in 2013. There are various statues of saints from around 1700: St. Peter, Anthony the Abbot, St. Sebastian, St. Anne with Mary, and St. Joseph with Child.

In the choir are tombstones dating from the 17th and 18th century including that of deacon Adriaen Wuestenraed. Furthermore, the church holds a Pietà from the 15th century and 16th century statues of St. Genevieve and St. Rochus, which were transferred from the Smeets Chapel in the Broekhovenstraat.

The 16th-century sacristy contains 17th-century furnishings and holds a Liège chalice from 1528.

The wall paintings of the Stations of the Cross date from 1912 and are by Gustave Meunier. The stained glass windows are late 20th century and depict people and saints related to the history of the Church.
