= Klaarland Priory =

Monastery in Limburg, Belgium

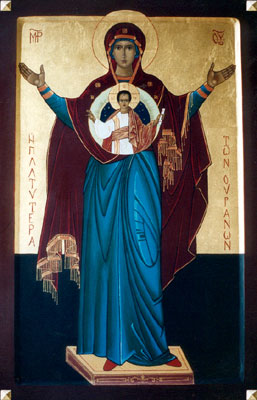
The icon of Our Lady of Klaarland.

Klaarland Priory or the Priory of Our Lady of Klaarland (Priorij Onze-Lieve-Vrouw van Klaarland) is a Trappistine monastery in Lozen in Bocholt in the province of Limburg, Belgium.

== History ==
In 1970, six nuns from the Abbey of Our Lady of Nazareth at Brecht started a new foundation: first in the district of Kiewit in Hasselt and, since 1975, on the present site in Bocholt. The priory remains subordinate to Brecht Abbey.

== Daily life ==
Life in the priory is characterized by prayer, reading and manual work, the three basic elements of Trappist life. The rhythm of the day is interrupted at set hours for celebrating the Liturgy of the Hours. These seven prayer services which take place throughout the day are accessible to everyone, both guests and visitors. On each day there is considerable time foreseen for mental reading, Lectio Divina. As in all other communities, the nuns work for their daily bread. Throughout the years some small businesses have been developed, such as brewer's yeast, hand-woven ornaments, candles, herb salve, massage oil and greeting cards. There is also a small guesthouse where women who seek silence and prayer can stay a few days. The priory cannot be visited casually, however.

== Sources ==
- Van Remoortere, J., 1990: Ippa's Abdijengids voor Belgie (p. 75). Lannoo
