= Beringen, Belgium =

Beringen
- City and municipality
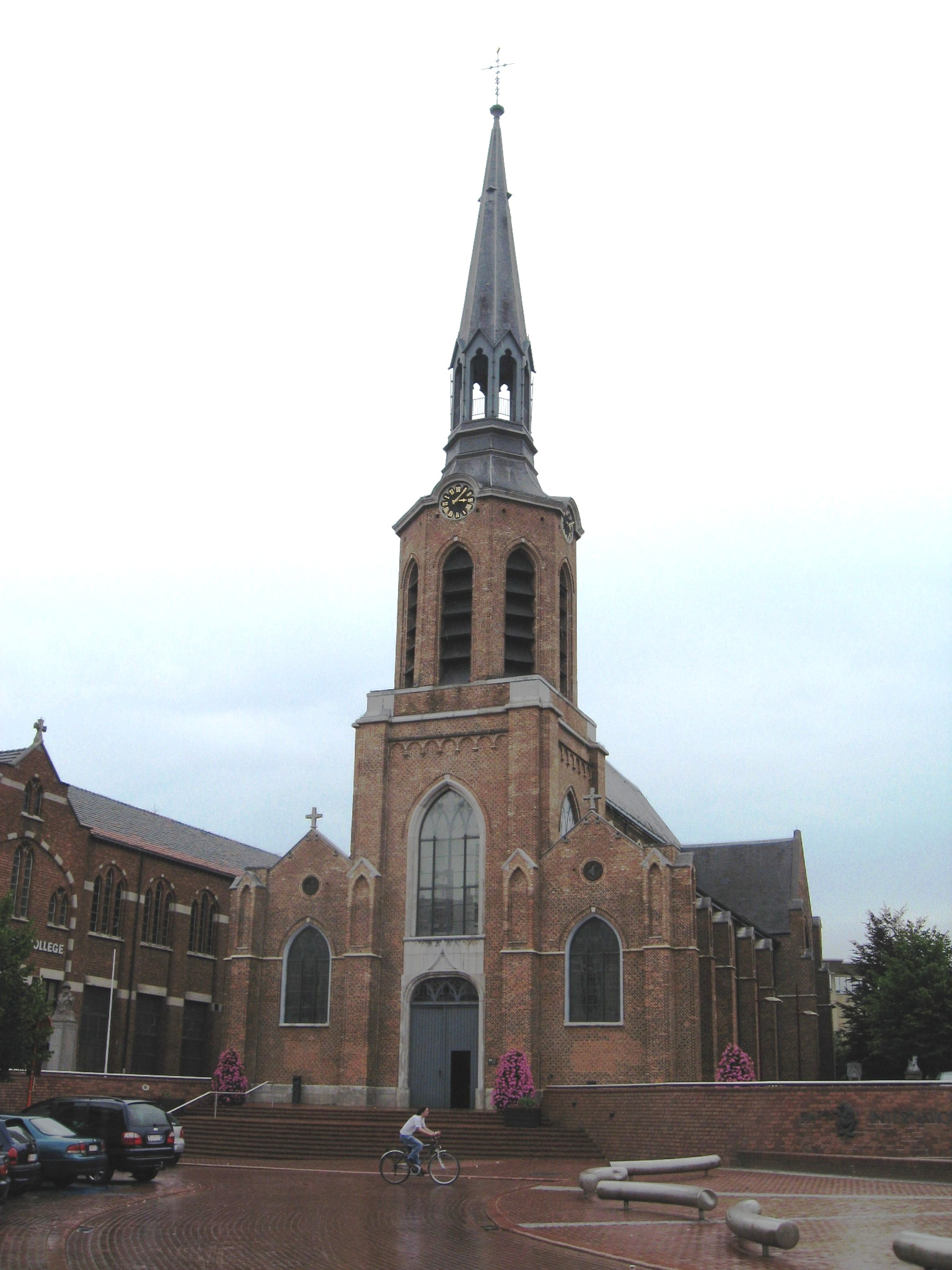
- St. Peter in Chains Church on Beringen Market Square

- Flag Coat of arms

- Location of Beringen in Limburg
- Interactive map of Beringen
- Location in Belgium
- Coordinates: 51°02′56″N 05°13′34″E
- Country: Belgium
- Community: Flemish Community
- Region: Flemish Region
- Province: Limburg
- Arrondissement: Hasselt

Government
  - Mayor: Thomas Vints (CD&V) (2019-24)
  - Governing parties: CD&V, N-VA, VOLUIT

Area
  - Total: 78.56 km^{2} (30.33 sq mi)

Population (2018-01-01)
  - Total: 46,065
  - Density: 586.4/km^{2} (1,519/sq mi)
- Postal codes: 3580, 3581, 3582, 3583
- NIS code: 71004
- Area codes: 011
- Website: www.beringen.be

Beringen (Dutch pronunciation: [ˈbeːrɪŋə(n)]; French: Béringue, French pronunciation: [beʁɛ̃ɡ]; Limburgish: Berringe) is a municipality and city located in the Belgian province of Limburg. The Beringen municipality includes the town of Beringen proper and the old communes of Beverlo, Koersel, and Paal.

== History ==
=== Origins ===
Beringen was already inhabited in Celtic times, as proven by the 1995 archeological finds of gold coins and artifacts on its territory. These date from around 90 BC and are the most northerly late-Iron-Age gold objects found in Europe. Other finds, including of Roman coins, indicate a very early establishment. The first mention of Beringen dates to 1120 when it was known as 'Beringe', a word derived from the Germanic Beringum, which meant 'with the people of Bero'. During Carolingian times, the land of Beringen had been donated to the abbey of Corbie in France.

For most of the medieval period, it was part of the County of Loon, from which it received its city charter in 1239. The city was then protected by impressive moats and gated walls. The county of Loon as a whole was annexed to the Prince-Bishopric of Liège in 1366. Beringen became one of the bishopric's 23 bonnes villes (principal cities) and shared its history until its dissolution in 1795.

=== Mining past ===
Under André Dumont's guidance, the first coal-bearing drill cores were obtained in Campine in 1901, leading to several coalmines being established in the region. The first production in Koersel dates from 1919. The golden age of coal production started right after World War II and lasted until the late 1950s, when cheaper energy sources were made available elsewhere. The last coal mine in Beringen closed its doors on October 28, 1989. The remaining slag heaps and mining buildings are still very obvious around the city.

== Sights ==
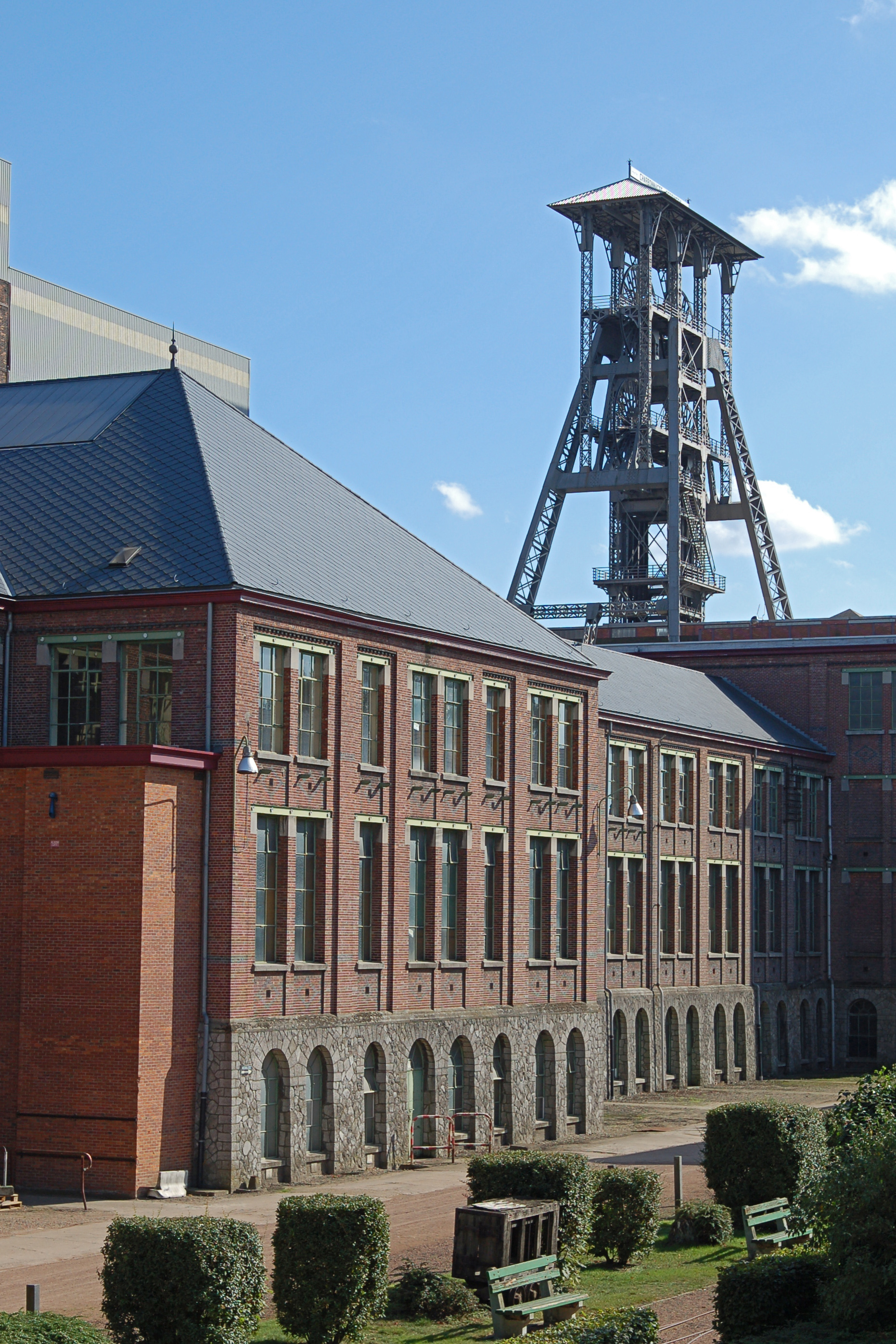
Beringen coal mine

- The Beringen Mine Museum and spoil tip is one of Beringen's main attractions and retraces the industrial history of the region. It is a former Anchor Point of ERIH, the European Route of Industrial Heritage.
- The St. Peter in Chains Church, with its elegant spire and rich Baroque interior.
- With its good network of biking trails, Beringen is also one of the best places in Campine for bikers.

== Events ==
- Yearly Kermesses take place both in Beringen Paal and in Koersel.
- At the beginning of August, Paal also organizes a whole-day musical event: "Paal op Stelten"
- The two-day-long "Koersel Terrast" takes place in late spring: music, dance, and fireworks are enjoyed by adults and children alike.
- A round of the Ethias Cross cyclocross race series has been held on a course on part of the site of the former coal mine since the 2019—2020 season
- The 1st round of the 2024 Exact Cross, Cyclocross Trophy was held here on 8 Oct. First place was taken by Fem Van Empel.

== Notable residents ==
- Lodewijk Heyligen (1304, Beringen - 1361, Avignon), Benedictine monk and music theorist
- Henricus Calenus (1583, Beringen - 1653, Brussels), clergyman who played a role in the history of Jansenism.
- Jo Vandeurzen, politician (b. 1958)
- Ingrid Berghmans, judoka (b. 1961)
- Mauro Pawlowski, musician (b. 1971)
