= Diocese of Hasselt =

Catholic ecclesiastical territory in Belgium

Coordinates: 50°56′01″N 5°19′53″E

Diocese of Hasselt Dioecesis Hasseletensis Diocèse de Hasselt (French) Bistum Hasselt (German) Bisdom Hasselt (Dutch)

Catholic
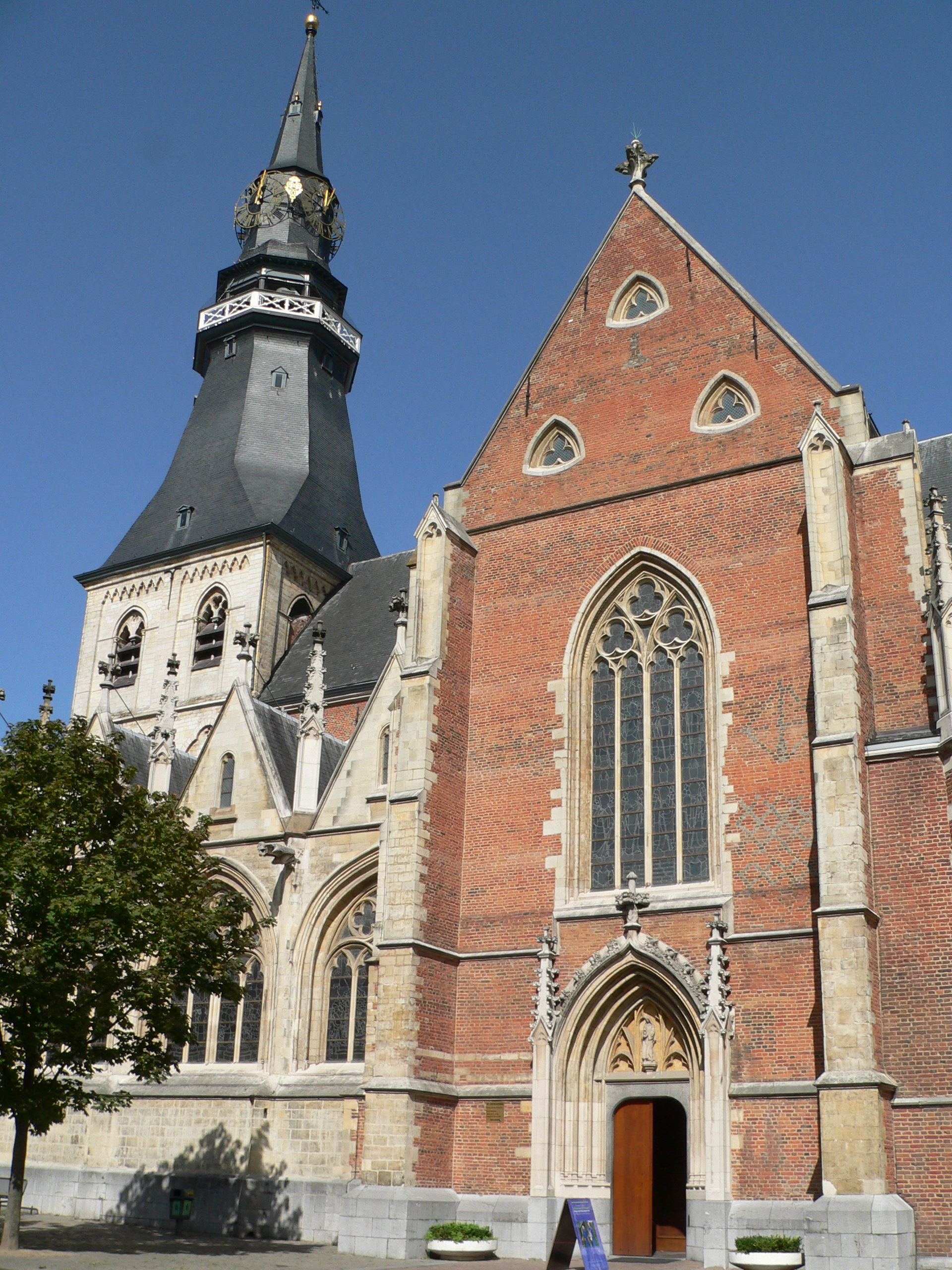
- St. Quentin's Cathedral in Hasselt

Location
- Country: Belgium
- Ecclesiastical province: Mechelen-Brussels
- Metropolitan: Archdiocese of Mechelen-Brussels

Statistics
- Area: 2,422 km^{2} (935 sq mi)
- Population: Total; Catholics: (as of 2019); 870,880; 635,730 (73%)

Information
- Denomination: Catholic Church
- Sui iuris church: Latin Church
- Rite: Roman Rite
- Established: 31 May 1967
- Cathedral: St. Quentin's Cathedral in Hasselt

Current leadership
- Pope: Leo XIV
- Bishop: Patrick Hoogmartens
- Metropolitan Archbishop: Jozef De Kesel

Map
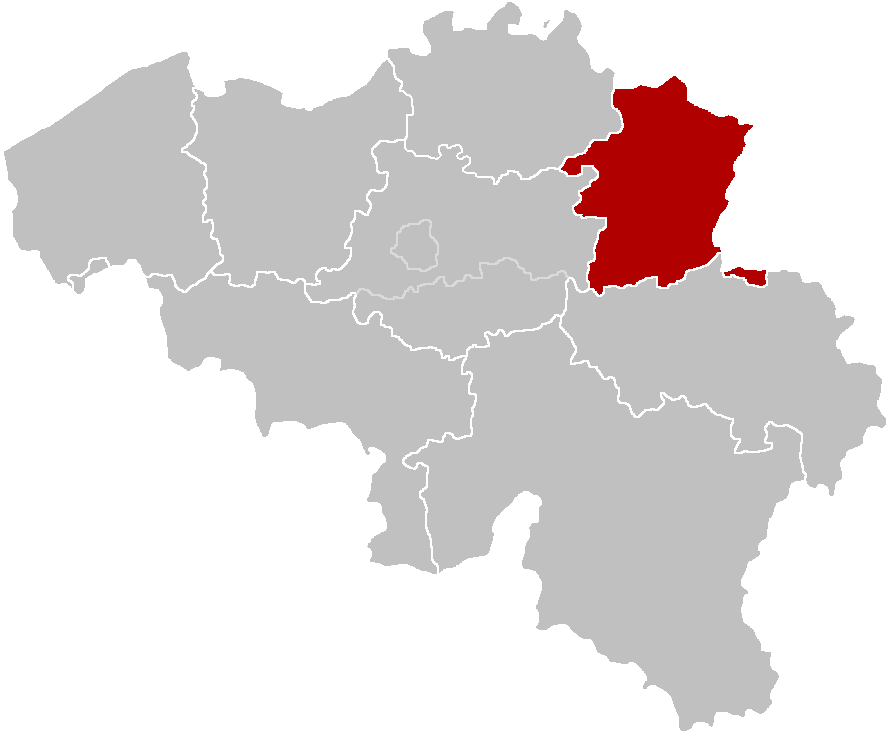
- The Diocese of Hasselt, coextensive with the Belgian province of Limburg

The Diocese of Hasselt (Latin: Dioecesis Hasseletensis) is a Latin Church ecclesiastical territory or diocese of the Catholic Church in Belgium. Comprising the whole of Belgian Limburg, the diocese was created in 1967 out of the Diocese of Liège. It is a suffragan in the ecclesiastical province of the metropolitan Archdiocese of Mechelen-Brussels. The cathedra is found within St. Quentin's Cathedral in Hasselt.

== Bishops ==
1. Jozef Maria Heusschen (1967–1989)
2. Paul Schruers (1989–2004)
3. Patrick Hoogmartens (2004–present)

== Affiliated Bishops ==
1. Philip Dickmans (2008–present)
