= St. Quentin's Cathedral, Hasselt =

St. Quentin's Cathedral
- Sint-Quintinuskathedraal
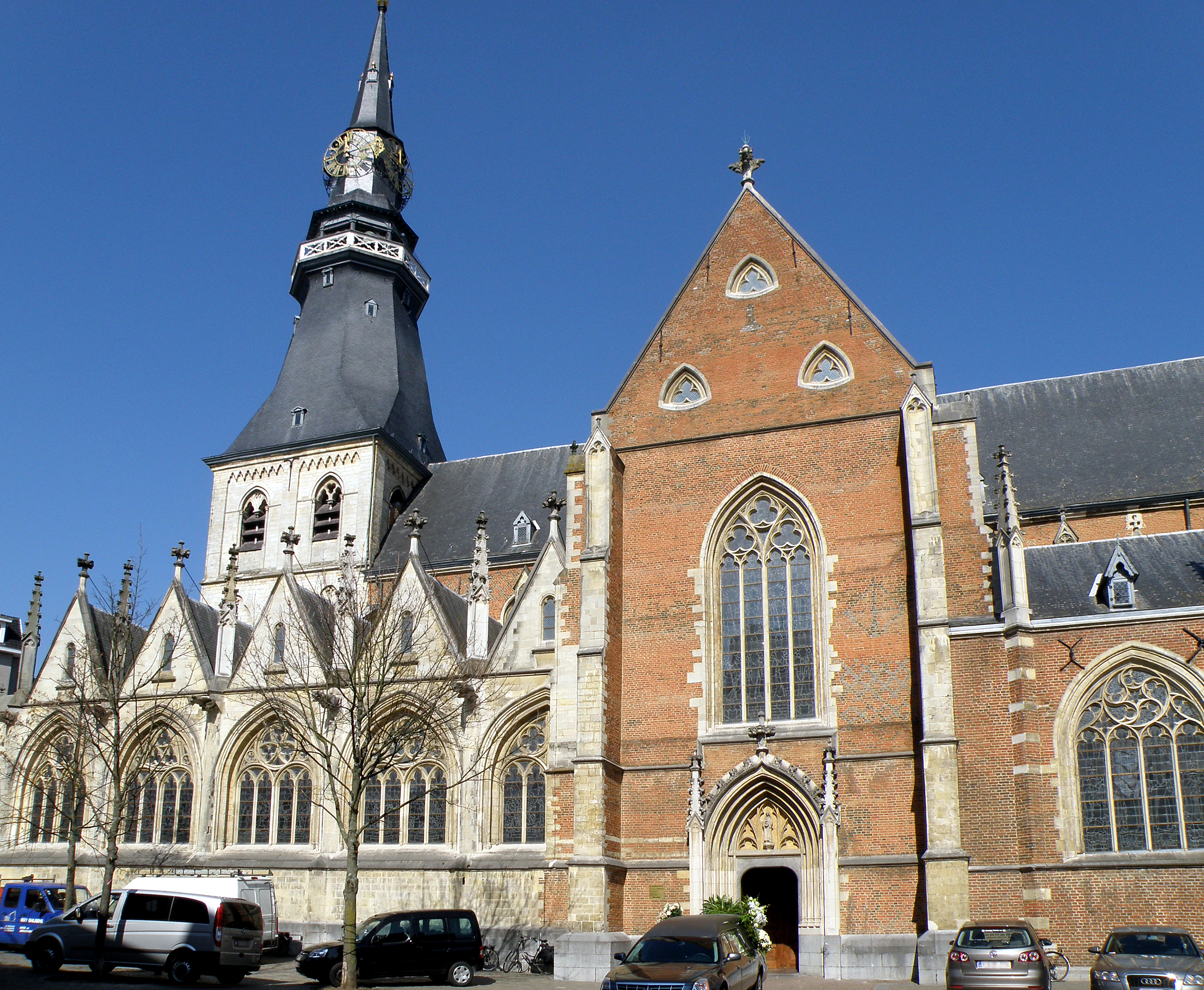
- St. Quentin's Cathedral
- 50.9297°N 5.3386°E
- Location: Hasselt
- Country: Belgium
- Denomination: Roman Catholic Church

Administration
- Diocese: Diocese of Hasselt

St. Quentin's Cathedral (Dutch: Sint-Quintinuskathedraal), also called Hasselt Cathedral, is a Roman Catholic cathedral in Hasselt, Belgium. Its construction began in the 11th century, and continued for two centuries. It was elevated to the status of cathedral in 1967 when the Diocese of Hasselt was created.

== History ==
A first church was built in the 8th century, but was replaced in the 11th century by a new Romanesque building. In the 15th century, the choir was added, and four chapels rebuilt. Also in the 15th century, Hagenprekers of the Netherlands came to preach Protestantism in Hasselt, then followed a period of iconoclasm. Maaseik Hasselt temporarily declared the separation of the church. During that time, he destroyed the tabernacle, statues, the side altar and the main altar, under the command of Gerard van Groesbeek.

The tower of the present church dates from 1725; it was restored in the 19th century. At that time, Gothic stained glass and paintings from Herkenrode Abbey, an abbey near the town, were added. The walls are also decorated with frescoes by Godfried Guffens, a local painter. The cathedral houses the works of many centuries, beginning in the 15th century. Since 1993, the cathedral is a protected heritage.

== See also ==
- Roman Catholicism in Belgium
- St. Quentin

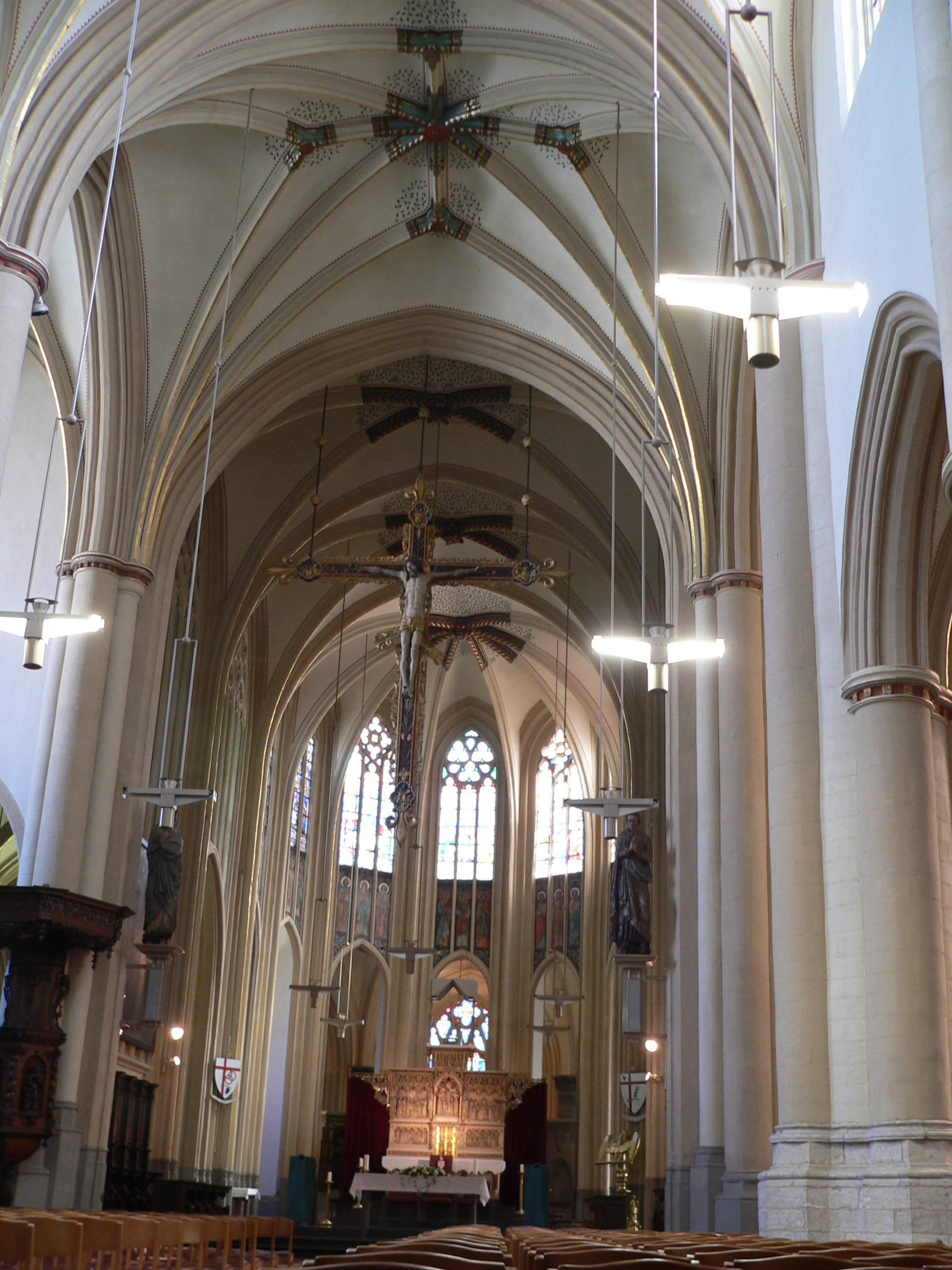
Internal view
