= Kozlovsky =

Kozlovsky (masculine), Kozlovskaya (feminine), or Kozlovskoye (neuter) may refer to:

- Kozlovsky (surname) (Kozlovskaya), a Russian last name
- 4944 Kozlovskij, a main-belt asteroid

== Places in Russia ==
- Kozlovsky (rural locality) (Kozlovskaya, Kozlovskoye), multiple rural localities
- Kozlovskaya, Arkhangelsk Oblast
- Kozlovsky, Republic of Bashkortostan
- Kozlovsky, Talovsky District, Voronezh Oblast
- Kozlovsky District, a district in the Chuvash Republic
  - Kozlovskoye Urban Settlement, composed of Kozlovka and three rural localities in Kozlovsky District

== See also ==
- Kozlovka (disambiguation), several inhabited localities in Russia
- Kozłowski, a surname
