= Kozłowski =

Kozłowski (Polish pronunciation: [kɔzˈwɔfski]; feminine: Kozłowska, plural: Kozłowscy) is the 12th most common surname in Poland (76,657 people in 2009). It is ranked second in both Warmia-Masuria (7,764) and Podlaskie (5,560) It is related to the following surnames:

Language	Masculine	Feminine
Polish	Kozłowski	Kozłowska
Belarusian (Romanization)	Казлоўскі (Kazloŭski)	Казлоўская (Kazloŭskaja, Kazlouskaya, Kazlouskaia)
Lithuanian	Kazlauskas	Kazlauskienė (married); Kazlauskaitė (unmarried)
Russian (Romanization)	Козловский (Kozlovsky, Kozlovskiy, Kozlovskij)	Козловская (Kozlovskaya, Kozlovskaia, Kozlovskaja)
Ukrainian (Romanization)	Козловський (Kozlovskyi, Kozlovskyy, Kozlovskyj)	Козловська (Kozlovska)

== People ==
- Agnieszka Kozłowska-Rajewicz (born 1969), Polish politician
- Artur Kozłowski (born 1985), Polish athlete
- Artur Kozłowski (1977–2011), Polish speleologist
- Bogusława Kozłowska-Tomasiak (born 1952), Polish rower
- Brian Kozlowski (born 1970), American football player
- David Kozlowski, American tennis player and television personality
- Dennis Kozlowski (born 1946), American businessman and convicted criminal
- Edward Kozłowski (1860–1915), Polish-American Catholic priest
- Filip Kozłowski, Polish footballer
- Glenda Kozlowski (born 1974), Brazilian journalist
- Grzegorz Kozłowski (born 1974), Polish diplomat
- Iwona Kozłowska, Polish diplomat
- Jacek Kozłowski (born 1957), Polish politician and manager
- Joanna Kozłowska (born 1959), Polish opera singer
- Jolanta Róża Kozłowska (born 1957), Polish diplomat
- Józef Kozłowski (born 1757/9), Polish-Russian composer
- Kacper Kozłowski (footballer), Polish footballer
- Kacper Kozłowski (sprinter) (born 1986), Polish sprinter
- Leon Kozłowski (1892–1944), Polish archaeologist and Prime Minister
- Linda Kozlowski (born 1958), American actress
- Magdalena Fularczyk-Kozłowska (born 1986), Polish rower
- Maria Franciszka Kozłowska (1862–1921), Polish Christian mystic
- Marian Kozłowski (1927–2004), Polish basketball administrator
- Marian Kozłowski (1915–1943), Polish sprint canoeist
- Maciej Kozłowski (1957–2010), Polish actor
- Roman Kozłowski (1889–1977), Polish paleontologist
- Steve Kozlowski (born 1952), American psychologist
- Tomasz Kozłowski (born 1958), Polish diplomat
- Tuvia Kozlowski, birth name of Tuvia Tzafir, Israeli actor

== See also ==
- Kozlovsky
- Koslowski
