= Maria Michał Kowalski =

Polish religious leader (1871–1942)

The Most Reverend Maria Michał Kowalski
- Archbishop
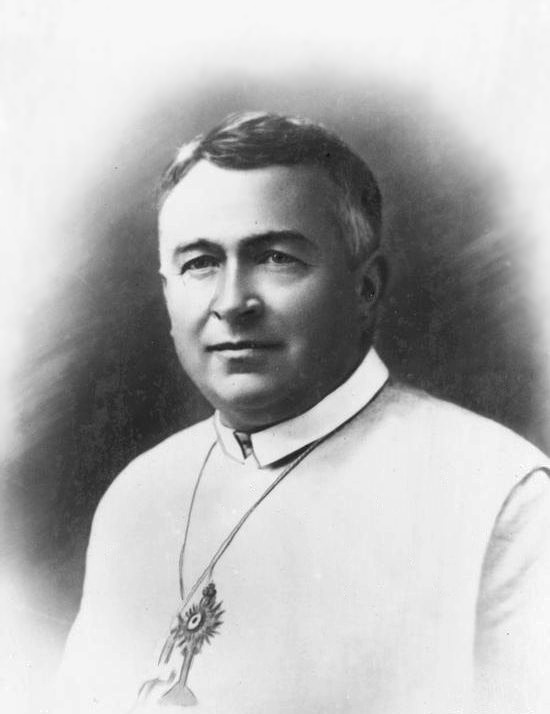
- Church: Old Catholic Church of the Mariavites
- In office: 1909–1935
- Successor: Maria Izabela Wiłucka-Kowalska
- Other posts: 29 December 1929 in Old Catholic Mariavite Church; Continued in Catholic Mariavite Church

Orders
- Ordination: 24 April 1897 by Franciszek Albin Symon
- Consecration: 5 October 1909 by Gerardus Gul

Personal details
- Born: Jan Kowalski; 27 December 1871 (Note: Peterkiewicz (1975, pp. 21–22) notes that biographical articles also give both 26 and 27 December as birth dates.) Latowicz, Vistula Land, Russian Empire
- Died: 18 May 1942 (aged 70) Hartheim Euthanasia Centre, Alkoven, Ostmark (Austria)
- Buried: Nazi cremation
- Denomination: Mariavite (1906–1942 (Note: Mariavites were recognized by the Russian Empire as a sect in 1906.)); Roman Catholic (1871–1906 (Note: He was excommunicated from the Catholic Church in 1906.))
- Parents: Jan and Katarzyna née Sitek
- Spouse: Maria Izabela Wiłucka-Kowalska
- Children: Michael
- Occupation: Bishop
- Education: Warsaw diocesan seminary

Sainthood
- Venerated in: Catholic Mariavite Church
- Canonized: 1942 by popular acclaim
- Shrines: Felicjanów, Płock County, Poland

Ordination history of Maria Michał Kowalski
History
Priestly ordination
- Ordained by: Franciszek Albin Symon
Episcopal consecration
- Principal consecrator: Gerardus Gul
- Co-consecrators: Jacobus Johannes van Thiel; Nicolaus Bartholomeus Petrus Spit; Josef Demmel; Arnold Harris Mathew
Episcopal succession
Bishops consecrated by Kowalski as principal consecrator
- Maria Andrzej Gołębiowski: 4 September 1910 (Note: Co-consecrated with Old Catholic bishops.)
- Maria Jakub Próchniewski: 4 September 1910
- Maria Franciszek Rostworowski: October 4, 1923
- Maria Bartłomiej Przysiecki: 28 March 1929
- Maria Filip Feldman: 28 March 1929
- Maria Izabela Wiłucka-Kowalska: 28 March 1929 (Note: KSM & "Biskupi Mariawiccy" does not include this consecration.)
- Maria Szymon Bucholc: 13 April 1933
- Maria Tytus Siedlecki: May 1935 (Note: Peterkiewicz (1975, p. 170) contradicts this and states Siedlecki was "consecrated by the bishopesses alone" at that time.)
- Marie Marc Fatôme: September 1938
- Maria Feliks Tułaba: 1939 (Note: Peterkiewicz (1975) does not include this consecration.)

Jan Kowalski, later known as Maria Michał Kowalski (27 December 1871 – 18 May 1942), was a Polish Roman Catholic diocesan priest who became a schismatic religious leader and controversial innovator. Following excommunication from his church, he was consecrated as a bishop in the Old Catholic Archdiocese of Utrecht, established the Old Catholic Church of the Mariavites in Poland, rose to be its archbishop and died a martyr. He is venerated as a saint in the Catholic Mariavite Church.

== Early life ==
He came from a wealthy farming family in Latowicz, one of twins and son of Jan and Katarzyna née Sitek. His twin sister died in infancy. After basic schooling, he studied at the diocesan seminary in Warsaw. He was ordained a Roman Catholic priest on 24 April 1897, by the Auxiliary Bishop of Mogilev, Franciszek Albin Symon. Kowalski served in parishes in Łódź, Niesułków and Stara Sobótka. In 1900, he became a curate at the Capuchin Church in Warsaw.

== Religious radical ==
In 1900 after a former seminary colleague had introduced him to the "Mariavite" movement, he met with the superior of the covert Order of Mariavite Priests, Kazimierz Przyjemski. In September of that year he entered the novitiate of the order and took his first vows to follow the rule of the Minor Friars. He took the religious name, Maria Michał. At Christmas 1901 he met the foundress Feliksa Kozłowska and was deeply impressed by her spirituality and ambitions for the Polish clergy. Despite his modest social background, his forceful personality enabled him to overtake the influence of other well educated and high-born clerics in her circle. He soon became her closest collaborator and confidante. Early in 1903 he was elected provincial of the Płock group of Mariavite priests. On 6 August, while a Mariavite delegation was applying for ecclesiastical recognition in the Vatican, Kowalski still only 32, was elected general of the order and became representative of the Association of Mariavites of Perpetual Adoration and Beseeching. Between 1904 and 1906 he headed delegations to the Holy See and to the Synod of Polish bishops in the territory of Congress Poland, lobbying for recognition of the Mariavite message contained in the "private revelations" vouchsafed to Feliksa Kozłowska and for approval of the Mariavite association.

=== Kowalski as envoy ===
The newly established movement had been intended to generate internal reform of the church in Poland. Until 1903 it had not been recognised by the Roman Catholic hierarchy in divided and occupied Poland. That year, the provincials of the Mariavite order presented the texts of Kozłowska's visionary revelations and a history of the movement to the Bishop of Płock, Jerzy Józef Szembek and to the archbishops of Warsaw and of Lublin in the hope of gaining ecclesiastical approval. While the archbishops of Warsaw and Lublin refused to consider the cause, bishop Szembek did take up a formal examination of the cause and initiated a Canonical Inquisition. The leaders of the movement were interviewed and their documents sent to the Holy See. Their cause was delayed in Rome by a conclave to elect the next pope.

Kowalski was considered the most capable person in the movement. He eventually led their presentation to the newly elected Pope Pius X. In September 1904, one month after the second Mariavite audience, a final decision was made by the Congregation of the Inquisition. In December 1904, the Holy See ruled against the Mariavites. It declared the revelations of Kozłowska to be "hallucinations". The Holy See forbade Kowalski any further activities on behalf of the association he headed and ordered its immediate dissolution. It also forbade any further contact between the priests and Kozłowska. Following the ruling, the Mariavite community sent two further delegations to the Holy See, but to no avail.

Kozłowska accepted the decision of the Holy See and for a time cut herself off from contact with the other nuns and priests of the community. The Mariavite priests, however, led by Kowalski, gradually decided to disregard the orders of the Holy See. In February 1906 the priests' group informed the Holy See that it was separating from the jurisdiction of the Polish bishops, but it asked its cause to be adjudicated by Rome. The bishop of Płock described the Mariavites as heretics and a wave of anti-Mariavite persecution followed by clergy suspensions.

In a final letter to the Archbishop of Warsaw, in March 1906, the Mariavites requested a reversal of the decisions made against them. In April 1906, Pius X promulgated the encyclical, Tribus circiter which maintained the decision of the Holy Office regarding Kozłowska and the Mariavite community. In December 1906, the Catholic Church finally excommunicated by name, Kozłowska, Kowalski and all their followers.

=== Beaten but not chastened ===
In the face of the terminal set-back, Kowalski with Kozłowska set about codifying the movement's doctrines and beliefs. A glimmer of hope appeared when in a move calculated to snub the Polish Catholic authorities, the Russian government recognized the Mariavite movement as a "tolerated sect" in November 1906. Then, through the good offices of Russian General Alexander Kireyev, the leadership was permitted to contact the Old Catholic Church of the Netherlands. Successful discussions between the two bodies led in 1909 to the invitation of a Mariavite delegation led by Kowalski, to attend a congress in Utrecht. There he was consecrated as the first Mariavite bishop, by the Old Catholic Church of the Netherlands Archbishop, Gerardus Gul, assisted by bishops, Jakob van Thiel of Haarlem, Nicholas Spit of Deventer, Josef Demmel of Bonn and Arnold Mathew from London. The Apostolic succession of that church validated his elevation and thereby turned the movement into a new church, which the Russian authorities consented to recognise as an "independent denomination" in 1912. As the ailing Kozłowska's influence waned so the forceful Kowalski had free rein to mould the new church to his liking. One controversial innovation was that from 1906, the church celebrated the liturgy in the Polish vernacular, rather than in Latin. In 1919, the Mariavites officially changed their name to the Old Catholic Church of the Mariavites.

=== Building and social action ===
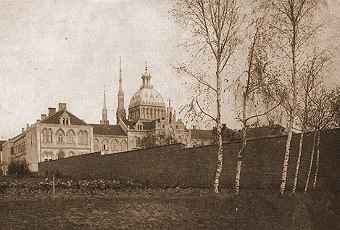
Sanctuary of Mercy and Charity with convent buildings

Mariavites were not only active in the religious sphere, they became active in social, educational and cultural projects. They were soon organizing kindergartens, schools, Literacy classes, libraries, kitchens for the poor, shops, printing houses, poorhouses, orphanages factories and animal husbandry. Their parishes soon built new churches and community centres causing dismay in the Roman Catholic Church.

From 1911, Kowalski project-managed the erection of the church's first sanctuary and convent in Płock, the Sanctuary of Mercy and Charity, completed in 1914. He had two highly qualified and experienced architect/engineers among the Mariavite priests, Szymanowski and Przysiecki, who delivered the plans and oversaw the construction. The Mariavites then bought an estate of 5 square kilometres (1.9 sq mi) near Płock which was named Felicjanów after Kozłowska.

The outbreak of World War I, although a terrible ordeal for the millions involved, eventually benefited the country, in that it regained its sovereign independence after 120 years, while the Mariavite Church garnered more adherents. It reached its peak in 1917 with ca. 160,000 worshippers. This period was the most successful for the Mariavites. They had developed many institutions and activities for the faithful. However, with Kozłowska in the background and Kowalski at the helm, gradually the number of adherents decreased. In 1921, the year she died, there were officially 43,000 adherents.

== Kowalski's apogee ==
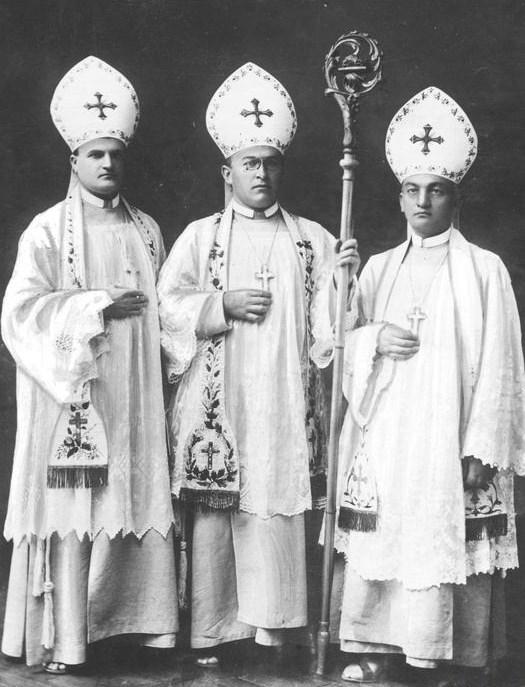
Mariavite bishops from left, Próchniewski, Kowalski and Gołębiowski

The church struggled during the newly re-emerged Polish state. Mariavites were generally vilified. Kowalski and his fellow priests were often sued in court. Kowalski himself appeared in 20 cases: among the charges were: blasphemy against God, the Bible, the Catholic Church, and the sacraments, then betrayal of the country, of socialism, communism, theft, fraud etc. He was blamed for the sexual abuses that had taken place in the Płock cloister. In 1931 he was convicted and sentenced to two years in prison, which he served from 1936 to 1938. Newspapers demanded the out-lawing of the Mariavite Church.

After Kozłowska died, Kowalski became head of the church and awarded himself the title of "archbishop". Earlier he had been strongly influenced by her vision and possibly tempered by her until her death. The faithful's loyalty reserved for Kozłowska was transferred to Kowalski. He took several radical initiatives within the church to differentiate it further from Roman Catholicism. His innovations have been described as far-reaching theologically and dogmatically as well as deeply liberalising. They included:

- 1922–1924 - Marriage available for priests
- 1922 Communion under the two species
- 1929 the Ordination of women, introduced in the Catholic Mariavite Church (with possibility of marriage)
- 1929–1935 Ordination of women, abolished in Old Catholic Mariavite Church (one reason for the schism in the church)
- 1930 Priesthood of the people of God similar to Protestant concept
- 1930 Eucharist for new-born baptized infants
- 1930 Removal of ecclesiastical titles
- 1930 Suppression of prerogatives of the clergy
- 1931–1933 Simplification of liturgical ceremonies
- 1931–1933 Simplification of the Lenten sacrifice

These innovations were controversial, not only to the Roman Catholics, but also to many Mariavites. However, his radical reforms, preaching Donatism and his modernistic approach disrupted the connection with the Old Catholics, who were then firmly opposed to the ordination of women and broke off fellowship in 1924.

In the 1920s and 1930s, Kowalski was seeking an ecumenical dialogue with other churches. He proposed union with the Polish National Catholic Church, and worked to extend contacts with Eastern Orthodox churches and other Eastern-tradition churches. To that end He began a series of ecumenical initiatives with a close knit group of his prelates. In 1926 they set off for the Balkans and the Middle East. During the extended trip he met with representatives of Eastern Orthodox Churches, in Serbia, Bulgaria, Greece, Turkey, Palestine and Egypt. In 1928–1930 he opened a dialogue with bishops of the Polish Catholic church and with the Polish Autocephalous Orthodox Church. However, since Kowalski would not give way on either doctrinal matters or the system of governance in the Old Catholic Mariavite Church, his search for church unity met with disappointment.

Internal opposition to "the dictatorship" of Kowalski crystallised in the early 1930s. In October 1934, the other bishops and priests demanded changes in the teachings and rules of administration in the church, but Kowalski refused to agree. In January 1935 the General Chapter of the Mariavite Priests (Synod) decided to remove Kowalski from his position. He and his supporters refused to accept the decision of the General Chapter. The church ruptured as Kozłowska had earlier prophesied. During this turbulent time, nearly 30 percent of adherents left the Mariavites and reverted to the Roman Catholic Church.

== Personal life ==
Kowalski legally married Izabela, a nun and bishop, who succeeded him after his death. They had a son, Michael.

=== Imprisonment and death ===
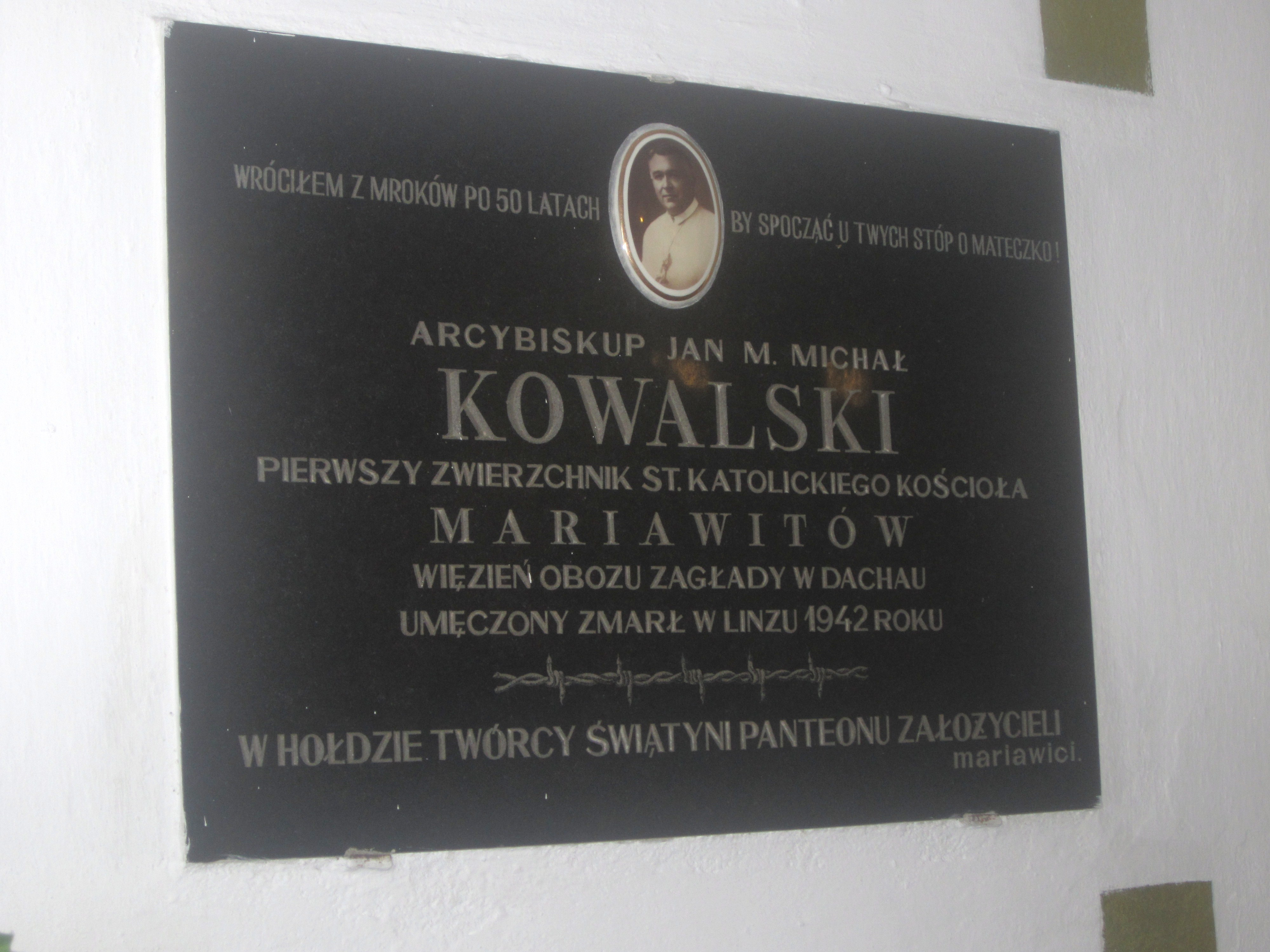
Memorial plaque to Kowalski

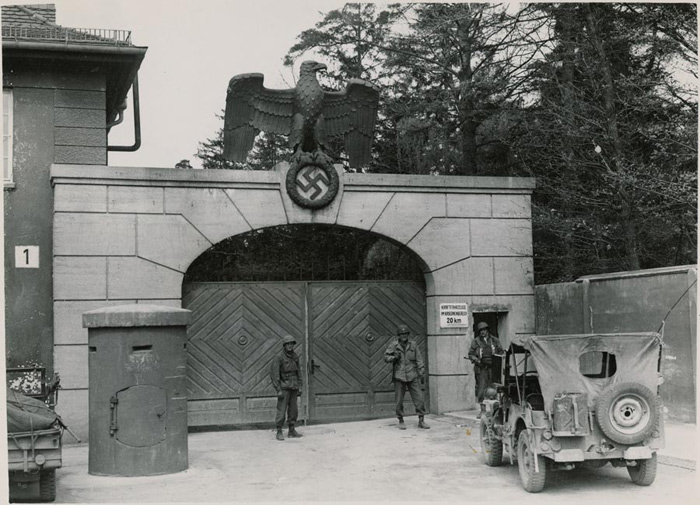
Gate to Dachau concentration camp

After the outbreak of World War II in September 1939, Kowalski wrote a letter to Adolf Hitler in which he criticised the annexation of the Polish coastline and invited the German chancellor to consider becoming a Mariavite, among other observations. The effect was to create the invader's interest in a small religious community that could present difficulties in the General Government.

On 25 January 1940, Kowalski was arrested by the Gestapo. He was imprisoned in Płock jail. Any prospect of a release was blocked owing to the overtly political statements he had made. During interrogations, the view was that he was a dangerous nationalist. On 25 April 1940 he was transferred to Dachau concentration camp. He was given no. 24542. He was kept in the priests block, no. 28, together with Polish Catholic clergy among whom was Bishop Michał Kozal, who tried unsuccessfully to persuade Kowalski back into the Roman Catholic fold.

Jan Kowalski was murdered in 1942, at age 70, at the Nazi Hartheim Euthanasia Centre in Alkoven, Ostmark (Austria). His body was cremated. He was one of the victims of the Nazi war criminal Karl Brandt, who led the euthanasia Action 14f13. (Note: Peterkiewicz (1975, p. 183) stated he was gassed on 18 May 1942.)

== Successors ==
Kowalski was deposed on 29 January 1935 by the General Chapter of the Old Catholic Mariavite Church in Płock; his successor in the Old Catholic Mariavite Church was Maria Filip Feldman.

When Kowalski was deposed, a number of his followers separated from the Old Catholic Mariavite Church and formed the Catholic Mariavite Church in Felicjanów. His successor in the Catholic Mariavite Church was his wife, Archpriestess Maria Izabela Wiłucka-Kowalska.

== Legacy ==
After his death, the Felicjanów Mariavite community recognised Jan Maria Michał Kowalski as a holy martyr. On account of the respect in which he was held, his portrait was displayed in his church's buildings. He is remembered several times during the liturgical year: 29 January – the deportation of Archbishop Michael from Plock 26 May – Martyrdom of Saint Michael, 29 September – St Michael Archangel, 25 December – Birthday of St. Michael. Mariavite settlers gave his name to a new village, Michałowo, Płońsk County

Jan Kowalski was a prolific writer, translator and editor. During his episcopate, he published around 40 Pastoral letters. He translated the Old and New Testaments of the Bible into Polish and Dante's Divine Comedy among other literary works. He edited the revelations of Feliksa Kozłowska in the Work of Great Mercy. He wrote several theological tracts and works in verse. To his editorship are owed information booklets, newsletters, liturgical books, and catechetical and other religious instruction books. He authored a number of polemical articles.

== Bibliography ==
- Appolis, Émile (1965). "Une Église des derniers temps: L'Église Mariavite". Archives de sociologie des religions (in French). 19 (19): 51–67. doi:10.3406/assr.1965.2572. ISSN 0003-9659. JSTOR 30120666.
- Brandreth, Henry R. T. (2007). Episcopi Vagantes and the Anglican Church. Borgo Press. ISBN 978-0-912134-06-2.
- Collinson, Patrick (1994). "Not sexual in the ordinary sense: women, men, and religious transactions". Elizabethan essays. London [u.a.]: Hambledon Press. pp. 143–146. ISBN 9781852850920. Read at the Renaissance Society in 1989.
- Coulombe, Charles (7 March 2019). "Heretic of the week - Jan Maria Michał Kowalski". Catholic Herald.
- Łagosz, Zbigniew (2013). "Mariavites and the Occult: A Search for the Truth". Anthropos. 108 (1): 256–266. doi:10.5771/0257-9774-2013-1-256. ISSN 0257-9774. JSTOR 23510279.
- Peterkiewicz, Jerzy (1975). The third Adam. London: Oxford University Press. ISBN 9780192121981.
- Rybak, Stanisław (n.d.). "Mariawityzm: studium historyczne" (PDF). mariawita-warszawa.com (in Polish). Michał Rybak. Archived from the original (PDF) on 16 March 2007.
- Old Catholic Mariavite Church (n.d.). "Biskupi Mariawiccy" [Mariavite bishops]. mariawita.pl (in Polish). Płock, PL: Kościół Starokatolicki Mariawitów. Archived from the original on 10 January 2014.
