= Maria Izabela Wiłucka-Kowalska =

Polish religious leader

- Archpriestess
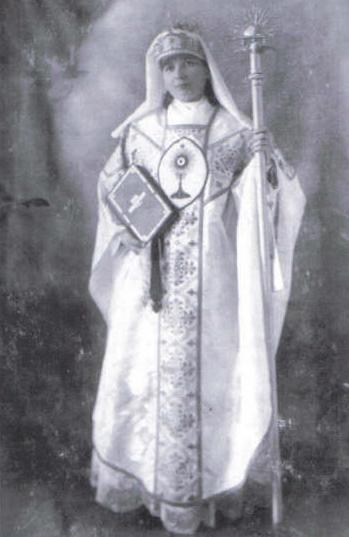
- Church: Catholic Mariavite Church
- Installed: 1940
- Term ended: 1946
- Predecessor: Jan Maria Michał Kowalski
- Successor: Maria Rafael Wojciechowski
- Other post: President of the Council of Major Superiors

Orders
- Ordination: 28 March 1929
- Consecration: 28 March 1929

Personal details
- Born: Antonina Wiłucka; October 28, 1890 Warsaw, Vistula Land, Russian Empire
- Died: November 28, 1946 (aged 56) Felicjanów, Płock County, Poland
- Buried: Felicjanów
- Denomination: Mariavite Christian
- Parents: Adam Wiłucki; Maria Antonina née Horn
- Spouse: Jan Maria Michał Kowalski
- Children: none (Note: She had no biological children but was the mother of record for one male child, Michael, whose father was her husband, Kowalski, and whose mother was another bishopess at the commune, Dilecta, according to Peterkiewicz (1975, pp. 148, 190–191).)

Sainthood
- Feast day: 3 September, 28 November
- Venerated in: Catholic Mariavite Church
- Canonized: 1946; Felicjanów by popular acclaim
- Shrines: Felicjanów, Płock County, Poland

Ordination history of Maria Izabela Wiłucka-Kowalska
History
Priestly ordination
- Ordained by: Jan Maria Michał Kowalski
- Date: 28 March 1929
- Place: Płock, Second Polish Republic
Episcopal consecration
- Principal consecrator: Maria Michał Kowalski
- Co-consecrators: Maria Jakub Próchniewski; Maria Andrzej Gołębiowski; Maria Franciszek Rostworowski
- Date: 28 March 1929
- Place: Płock

Antonina Maria Izabela Wiłucka-Kowalska (née Wiłucka; 28 October 1890 – 28 November 1946) was a Polish religious leader, who served as the first archpriestess of the Catholic Mariavite Church. (Note: The title archpriestess, a translation of arcykapłanka, is used throughout Peterkiewicz (1975).) Wiłucka-Kowalska was the first woman to receive the sacrament of holy orders in Poland and consecration as a bishop.

== Positions held ==
- September 8, 1922 – 1935: Superior General of the Congregation of the Mariavite Sisters (Old Catholic Mariavite Church)
- 1929 – 1935: Bishop of the Old Catholic Mariavite Church.
- 1935 – 1946: Superior General of the Congregation of the Mariavite Sisters (Catholic Mariavite Church)
- 1935 – 1940: Bishop of the Catholic Mariavite Church, a schism from the Old Catholic Mariavite Church.
- 1940 – 1946: Archpriestess and President of the Council of Major Superiors of the Catholic Mariavite Church.

== Early life ==
Wiłucka was a member of the Polish landed gentry. She was the daughter of Adam Wiłucki and Maria Antonina née Horn. She attended the Russian gymnasium in Warsaw for several years, and then enrolled in Marta Łojkówna's pedagogical institute for women in Warsaw. She graduated in 1909.

The following year, she tutored children of a Polish landed gentry family in Polesie, Orda, at their estate in Perekale, Minsk Governorate for four years. One of the Orda proposed marriage. She became familiar with the English, French, German, and Russian languages, and she was musically talented.

== Appointment ==
After the outbreak of the World War I and the death of the estate owner, with his family Ordów, she was deported to Crimea, where, after three years, in 1918, she returned to the Second Polish Republic, to his family in Warsaw.

In the same year, while she was with a family in Płock, she encountered Mariavitism and Feliksa Kozłowska, its founder. Soon afterward, despite her family's objections, she joined the Mariavite Sisters.

In 1920, she took the religious name of Maria Izabela. (Note: Kowalski created a covert inner church, the Philadelphic church of Love, after the death of Kozłowska. In the context of the covert inner church, Kowalski named her Abishag and the first of his mystical polygamous wives.) Wiłucka was Kozłowska's suggested successor as Superior General of the Mariavite Sisters, which Wiłucka became after she professed perpetual vows on 8 September 1922.

In the same year, after the introduction of clerical marriage into the Old Catholic Mariavite Church, (Note: Górecki (2006) commented that mystical marriages – between priests and nuns – is one of three sensitive subjects within Mariavitism, along with worship of Kozłowska and common priesthood. Górecki notes that, in 1986, Catholic Church of the Mariavites Archbishop Maria Rafael Wojciechowski said that the term mystical marriage (małżeństwa mistyczne) originated outside of Mariavitism as a term of ridicule.) she married the charismatic leader of the church, Archbishop Jan Maria Michał Kowalski on 3 October 1922, in one of the first secret mystical marriages – between a priest and a nun. (Note: Wiłucka-Kowalska had a role in procuring Mariavite mystical marriages. According to Peterkiewicz (1975, p. 91), she was Kowalski's accomplice by "welcom[ing] the new insider" and pacifying "guilty second thoughts" the selected nun may have. Peterkiewicz (1975, p. 225) pondered if Wiłucka-Kowalska was "filled with holiness" could she have "had a taste for the dark side of sex?" Wiłucka-Kowalska was, according to Peterkiewicz (1975, p. 141), "bullied and encouraged in turn" by the "overbearing" Kowalski.)

== Bishop of the Old Catholic Mariavite Church ==
In 1929, after the introduction of the ordination of women in the Old Catholic Mariavite Church, Wiłucka-Kowalska and 11 other nuns were ordained in Płock on 28 March 1929. Wiłucka-Kowalska was then consecrated as a bishop. (Note: Peterkiewicz (1975, pp. 143, 237) noted that according to the Mariavite publication Królestwo Boże na Ziemi, on Easter, "31 March 1929 they witnessed 'the first Mass celebrated by a woman'.") From that time, having the title of archpriestess, she was a member of the Old Catholic Mariavite Church synod of bishops, along with Maria Jakub Próchniewski, Maria Filip Feldman, and Maria Bartholomew Przysiecki. Her responsibilities included care of the priesthood of sisters.

In 1926, Wiłucka-Kowalska participated in an unsuccessful Old Catholic Mariavite Church bishops delegation to the Balkans and Middle East, where she presented the mission and activities of the Old Catholic Mariavite Church to Eastern Christian Churches.

== Bishop of the Catholic Mariavite Church ==
The schism of the Catholic Mariavite Church from the Old Catholic Mariavite Church, in 1935, forced Wiłucka-Kowalska and her husband, Kowalski, and their followers to move to Felicjanów.

She remained the Superior General of the Congregation of the Mariavite Sisters and participated in the management of the Catholic Mariavite Church, which separated from the main Mariavite denomination.

While her husband, Kowalski, served 18 months of a prison sentence beginning in July 1936 for his 1928 and 1929 convictions, (Note: Kowalski was convicted in 1928 of sexual offenses against 5 underage girls and 3 women, under three separate penal code articles, crimes in which victims are "raped or forced in any other way to have intercourse with the accused." He was sentenced to 4 years imprisonment but that sentence was reduced first to 2 years 8 months and then to 1 year 4 months; another 6 month sentence, for a separate 1929 conviction for blasphemy, was added to that. The 1928 verdict was upheld in 1929 and the appeal court commented "that Kowalski 'raises sexual intercourse to a religious cult'." A witness testified that Wiłucka-Kowalska "had encouraged her, when she was still very young, to submit to his wishes." Wiłucka-Kowalska was not prosecuted.) Wiłucka-Kowalska exercised authority over the church. From 1936 to 1939, she resumed publication of a fortnightly periodical, Królestwo Boże na Ziemi, in Felicjanów.

Following the arrest by the Gestapo of Kowalski in January 1940 and his deportation to the Priest Barracks of Dachau Concentration Camp, Wiłucka-Kowalska took over the management of the Catholic Mariavite Church until her death in 1946.

In March 1941, all the inhabitants of the church commune in Felicjanów were deported to Soldau concentration camp, then to a camp in the Modlin Fortress and then to Pomiechówek. After her release, Wiłucka-Kowalska lived in Plonsk, where some sisters were employed at a hospital. As far as possible, she led the Catholic Mariavite Church and maintained correspondence with her husband, who was imprisoned in Dachau concentration camp.

After the front passed through, in the spring of 1945 she returned to the destroyed Felicjanów. She died on 28 November 1946. She was buried in the park in front of the manor house in Felicjanów. After her death, she was regarded by Catholic Mariavite Church adherents as a saint.
