= Kozlovsky (rural locality) =

Kozlovsky (Russian: Козловский; masculine), Kozlovskaya (Козловская; feminine), or Kozlovskoye (Козловское; neuter) is the name of several rural localities in Russia:

- Kozlovsky, Republic of Bashkortostan, a village in Urman-Bishkadaksky Selsoviet of Ishimbaysky District of the Republic of Bashkortostan
- Kozlovsky, Belgorod Oblast, a settlement in Novooskolsky District of Belgorod Oblast
- Kozlovsky, Karachevsky District, Bryansk Oblast, a settlement under the administrative jurisdiction of Karachev Urban Administrative Okrug in Karachevsky District of Bryansk Oblast
- Kozlovsky, Pochepsky District, Bryansk Oblast, a settlement in Belkovsky Rural Administrative Okrug of Pochepsky District of Bryansk Oblast
- Kozlovsky, Sverdlovsk Oblast, a settlement under the administrative jurisdiction of the City of Yekaterinburg in Sverdlovsk Oblast
- Kozlovsky, Anninsky District, Voronezh Oblast, a settlement in Berezovskoye Rural Settlement of Anninsky District of Voronezh Oblast
- Kozlovsky, Talovsky District, Voronezh Oblast, a settlement in Dobrinskoye Rural Settlement of Talovsky District of Voronezh Oblast
- Kozlovskaya, Arkhangelsk Oblast, a village in Rakulo-Kokshengsky Selsoviet of Velsky District of Arkhangelsk Oblast
- Kozlovskaya, Komi Republic, a village in Loyma Selo Administrative Territory of Priluzsky District of the Komi Republic
