= Pope Pius X and Russia =

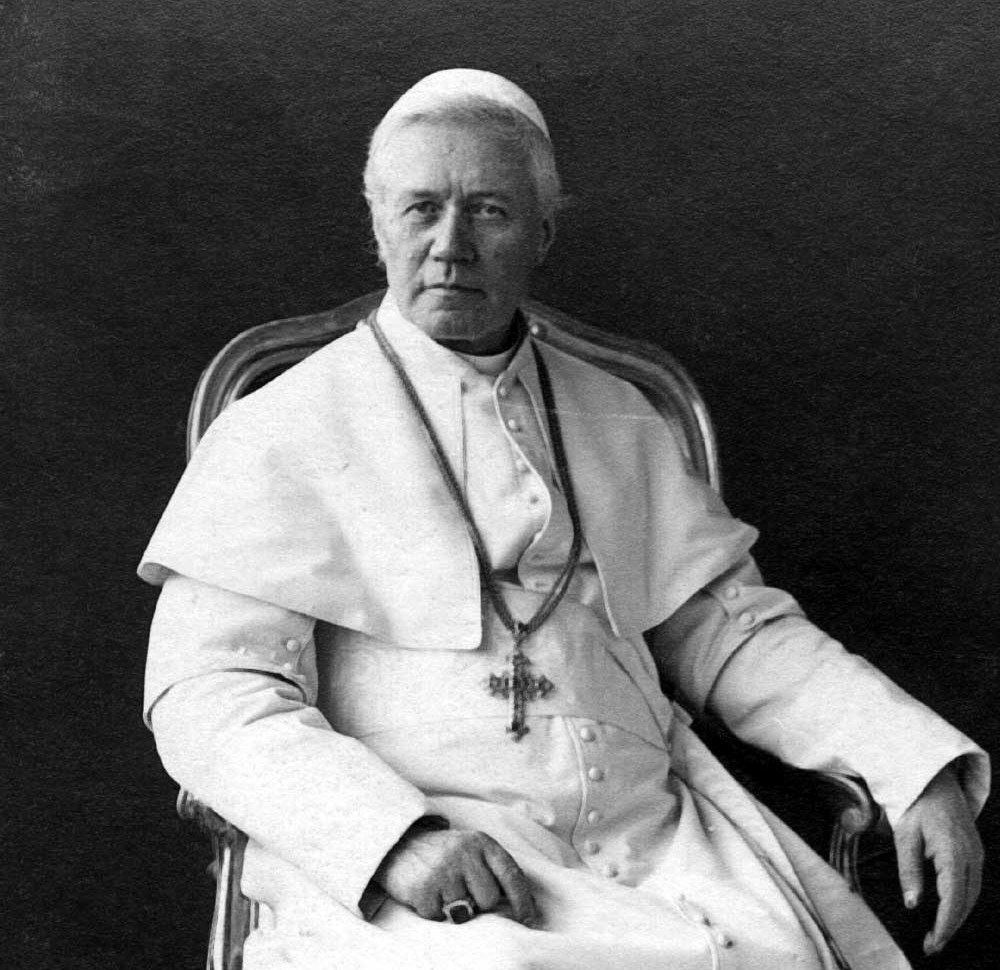
Pope Pius X in 1905

The relations between Pope Pius X and Russia were quite difficult, and the situation of Polish Catholics in Russia generally did not improve significantly.

== Religious freedom decrees in 1903 and 1905 ==
Tsar Nicholas II issued a decree on 22 February 1903, promising religious freedom for the Catholic Church, and, in 1905, promulgated a constitution, which included religious freedom.

== Opposition to the Mariavites ==
A religious movement supported and financed by Russia, the Mariavites, began to gain ground among Polish Catholics, although the Pope had condemned it in 1907. In his 1906 encyclical Tribus circiter Pope Pius X wrote to the episcopate, warning against national radicals and asking for peace and order.

== 1907 agreement ==
In 1907, Pope Pius X signed an agreement that prescribed mandatory Russian history and literature courses in Catholic seminaries in Polish Russia in exchange for greater rights for Catholics.

== Russia and the Eastern Catholic Churches ==
The Apostolic Letter Ea Semper appointed Kyr Soter Ortynsky as the first Bishop of the Eastern Catholic Churches in the United States. As it strictly limited his ability to act, Ea Semper led to a large number of defections of Eastern Rite Catholics to the Tsarist-funded missionary Diocese of the Russian Orthodox Church in America.

These concessions to the demands of anti-Byzantine Latin bishops were made, however, in order to secure their grudging agreement to having a bishop from the Eastern Catholic Churches within their midst and were always intended to be temporary. The driving force for the appointment of Bishop Soter Ortynsky in the first place had been Metropolitan bishop Andrey Sheptytsky of the Ukrainian Greek Catholic Church, who had persuaded the Holy See that establishing a Byzantine Rite hierarchy in the United States was an urgent necessity given the large number of defections to Russian Orthodoxy. Furthermore, on 28 May, 1913, Pope Pius X felt secure enough to remove all remaining restrictions upon Bishop Soter Ortynsky, who was granted full jurisdiction over all Rusyn and Ukrainian American Byzantine Catholics and was made completely independent of the local Roman Rite Bishops.

After the Russian Revolution of 1905, Metropolitan Andrey Sheptytsky, who was seeking to assume jurisdiction over the growing number of Eastern Catholics in Russia, had two audiences, in 1907 and 1908, with Pope Pius X in which the matter of creating an underground Russian Greek Catholic Church under Tsarism was discussed at length. After being asked, the Pope confirmed Metropolitan Andrey's belief that he, instead of the local Roman Rite Bishops, already held jurisdiction over all Byzantine Catholics living under Tsarism. In order to spread the Catholic Church in Russia, the Pope also granted Sheptytsky all the authority of a Patriarch of a self-governing Eastern Catholic Church, but without the actual title, over the Russian Empire. In addition to the extremely rare privilege of Communicatio in sacris as a tool of Greek Catholic evangelisation, Sheptytsky was told that he was free to ordain priests and even to consecrate Bishops while reporting only to the Pope himself. Pope Pius advised Sheptytsky, however, to delay using his powers openly until a more opportune time, as otherwise the infamously anti-Catholic Imperial Russian Government would cause an enormous amount of trouble for him.

Sheptytsky accordingly waited until after the 1917 February Revolution and the abdication of Nicholas II before organizing the first Apostolic Exarchate for the Russian Greek Catholic Church and assigning Fr. Leonid Feodorov to lead it.

== Feeling of betrayal by Russia ==
Toward the end of his life, Pope Pius X felt betrayed by Russia, which had not eased the religious persecution of the Catholic Church in Russia. At his last public reception of the Diplomatic Corps, he publicly told the Russian ambassador, Aleksandr Nelidov:

We will not accept greetings or congratulations from Russia, which did not keep a single promise to us or to the Catholics in Russia.

As the surprised Nelidov disagreed, the Pope stood up from his throne and asked him to leave the room.

== Bibliography ==
- Acta Apostolicae Sedis ( AAS), Roma, Vaticano 1922-1960
- L. Boudou, Le S. Siege et la Russie, Paris, 1890
- Owen Chadwick, The Christian Church in the Cold War, London 1993
- Handbuch der Kirchengeschichte, VII, Herder Freiburg, 1979, 355-380
