= Mariavite Sisters =

Mariavite Sisters may refer to:

- Congregation of the Mariavite Sisters (Old Catholic Mariavite Church), the Old Catholic Mariavite Church religious congregation for women, founded and led by Feliksa Kozłowska after it was suppressed and excommunicated by the Catholic Church in 1906
- Congregation of the Mariavite Sisters (Catholic Mariavite Church), the Catholic Mariavite Church religious congregation for women, separated from the Old Catholic Mariavite Church religious institute in 1935
