= Koslowski =

Koslowski is a surname. It is a variant of Kozłowski. Notable people with the surname include:

- Álvaro Koslowski (born 1971), Brazilian sprint canoer
- Dennis Koslowski (born 1959), American Olympic wrestler
- Duane Koslowski (1959–2025), American Olympic wrestler, twin brother of Dennis
- George Bernard "Dave" Koslowski (1920–1975), American baseball player
- Peter Koslowski (1952–2012), German professor of philosophy
- Willi Koslowski (1937–2024), German football player

== See also ==
- Kozłowski, a surname
- Kozlovsky, a surname
