= Wieliczna, Masovian Voivodeship =

Wieliczna
- Village
- Location within Poland
- Coordinates: 52°33′N 21°49′E
- Country: Poland
- Voivodeship: Masovian
- County: Węgrów
- Gmina: Stoczek

Wieliczna [vjɛˈlit͡ʂna] is a village in the administrative district of Gmina Stoczek, within Węgrów County, Masovian Voivodeship, in east-central Poland.

== Notable people ==
- Feliksa Kozłowska, Polish Christian mystic
