= Catholic Mariavite Church =

Religious organization in Poland

- Kościół Katolicki Mariawitów
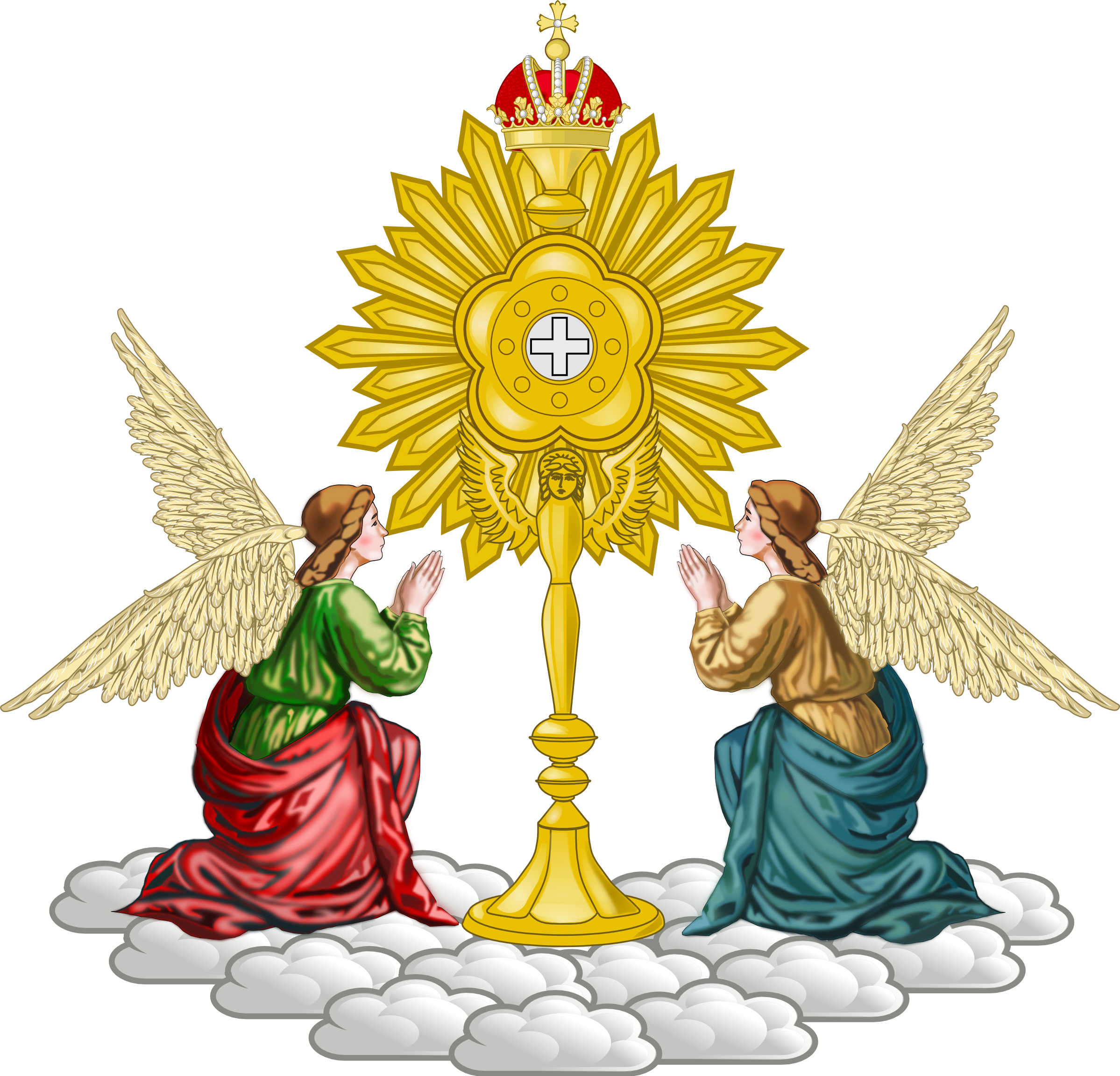
- Mariavite emblem
- Classification: Old Catholic
- Orientation: Old Catholicism
- Polity: Episcopal/Presbyterial
- Prime bishop: Maria Beatrycze Szulgowicz
- Custodies: 2
- Associations: none
- Region: Poland
- Headquarters: Felicjanów, Poland
- Origin: 1935; Felicjanów, Second Polish Republic
- Separated from: Old Catholic Mariavite Church
- Parishes: 17
- Members: 1980
- Ministers: 11
- Places of worship: 14
- Other name: Mariavite Catholic Church
- Official website: mariawita.pl

The Catholic Mariavite Church is an independent Old Catholic denomination in Poland resulting from a schism in 1935 within the Old Catholic Mariavite Church.

== Origins ==
Originally, the Mariavite movement emerged as a call for renewal within the Polish Catholic church in the Russian Partition of the one time Commonwealth of Poland-Lithuania, which had been forcibly broken up by foreign powers a century earlier. After the failed Polish insurrections of 1830-31 and 1863-64, Poles' continuing political dissent and desire for independence found partial expression in the second half of the 19th-century in an assertion of their traditional religious and spiritual values which ran counter to the Russian Empire's established Orthodox church. Despite curtailment and bans of Polish religious organisations, they proliferated both on the former Polish territory and abroad, chiefly in France, Italy and the United States, where Polish emigrants had settled and lent support. See role of Resurrectionist Congregation.

"Mariavitism", from the Latin, quae Mariae vitam imitantur, signified imitating the life of Mary, mother of Jesus in its simplicity. It was probably nurtured by the Capuchin friar, blessed Honorat Koźmiński in a young Polish nun, Feliksa Kozłowska, who in 1893 began having a series of religious visions. These were said to have "instructed" her to take steps in particular to rescue Catholic clergy from the error of their ways, which members of the Polish élite tended to view as corrupt and estranged from the Gospel message. The movement rapidly gained influence among priests from educated or noble backgrounds. The new "tenets" emanating from the visions soon came into conflict with the church hierarchy who were hostile to their alleged provenance.

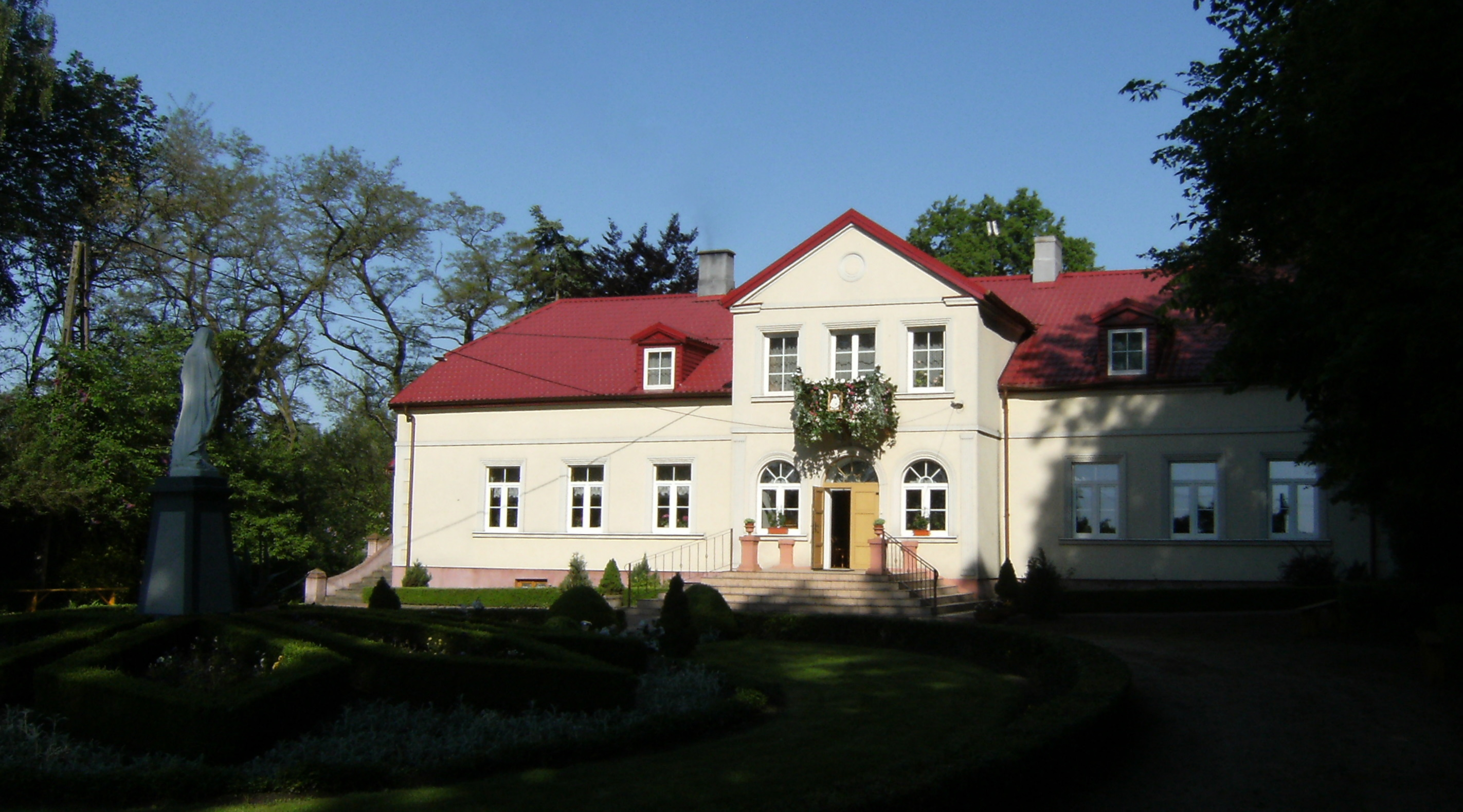
Mariavite Monastery in Felicjanów, headquarters of the Catholic Mariavite Church

== Excommunication by Rome ==
After the movement had found itself rebuffed first by the Polish church hierarchy, and subsequently, twice by the Holy See which saw no justification for the movement's cause, Kozłowska obeyed the instructions from Rome not to contact any of the Mariavite priests and remain in her convent. However, in 1906 the newly elected Pope Pius X emphasised the church's condemnation of the movement and its ideology by excommunicating Sister Feliksa Kozłowska and her priest lieutenant, Father Jan Maria Michał Kowalski. He had led the failed 1903–1906 attempt to incorporate the Mariavite movement in the Roman Catholic Church and to have Kozłowska's revelations judged as worthy of belief by the church. This rendered them heretics in the eyes of the church and placed their adherents under an immediate obligation to resume their traditional Roman Catholic practice on pain of excommunication.

Kowalski set about codifying the movement's doctrines and beliefs with Kozłowska. Along with the priests who resisted the orders from the Vatican, he turned instead to the schismatic Old Catholic Church of the Netherlands and found a welcome among the clergy. He was invited to attend their 1909 congress in Utrecht, when he was consecrated bishop. The apostolic succession of that church validated his elevation and thereby turned the movement into a new church, which the Russian authorities quickly consented to recognise as an "independent denomination." As the ailing Kozłowska's influence waned, so the forceful Kowalski had free rein to mould the new church to his liking.

== Collision course ==
However, under his leadership Mariavite adherents declined. This was due in part to the rise of Polish nationalism, in which Roman Catholicism was an intrinsic part of the Polish national identity, and the creation of a sovereign Second Polish Republic in 1918. But much of the decline could be traced to factors involving Kowalski himself – his generally autocratic style in governing the church, as Kozłowska's successor and, innovations that he had introduced which drove him further away from the Catholic Church. These included the endorsement of consummated clerical marriages between priests and nuns, and later the ordination of women as priests and bishops. It eventually, in 1924, alienated him from the Old Catholic church as well and took the Mariavite church out of fellowship with it.

== 1935 schism ==
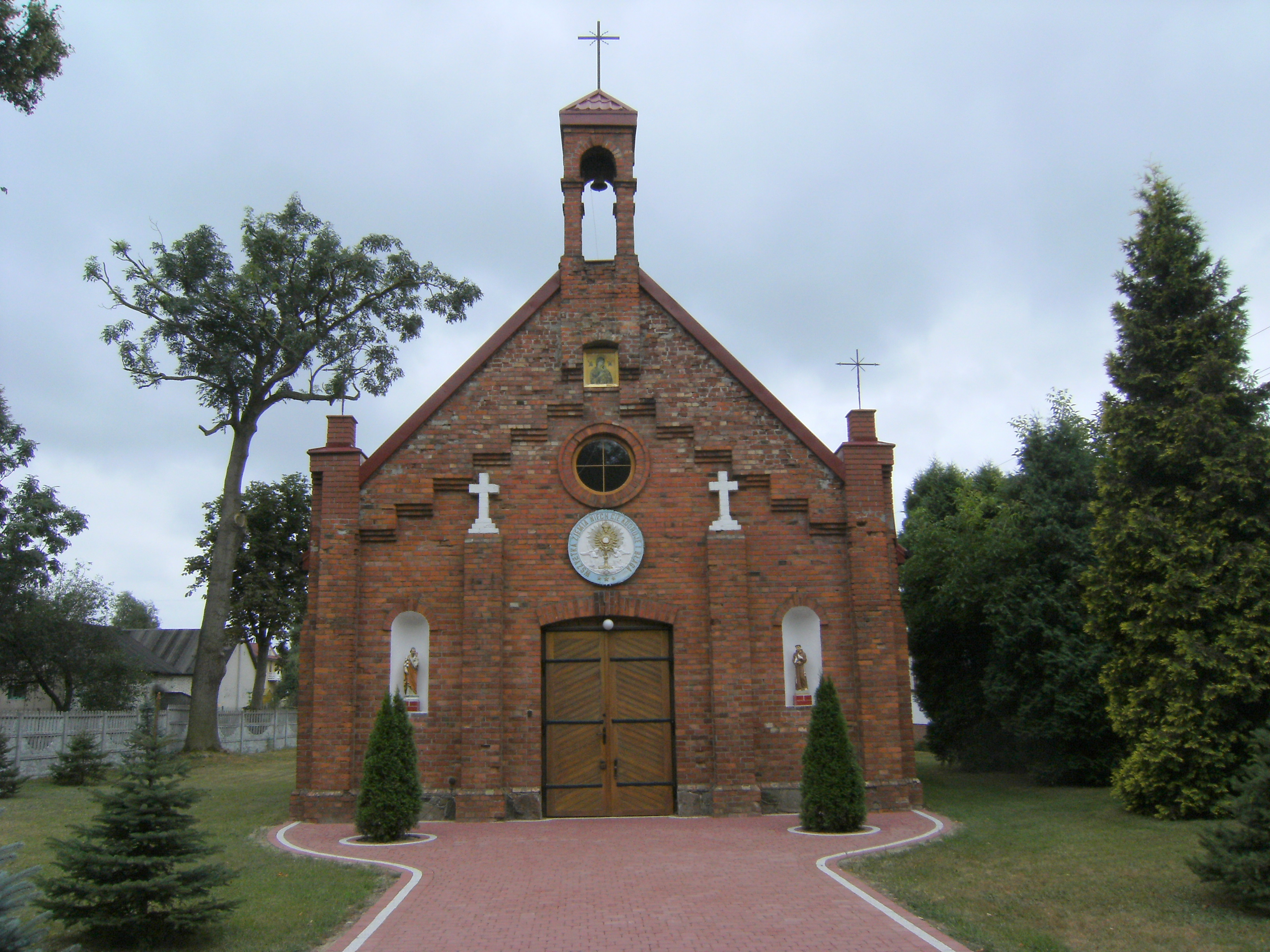
Catholic Mariavite Church in Długa Kościelna

In 1935, a majority of the Old Catholic Mariavite Church clergy, many of whom had participated in his "innovations", deemed him to have become a "dictator" and deposed Kowalski. He rejected the "coup" and moved out of the Płock sanctuary and installed his headquarters in the village of Felicjanów, named for the foundress. He declared his loyal following to be the Catholic Mariavite Church, despite its considerable departure from traditional doctrinal Catholic teaching. Kowalski, by then promoted to archbishop, continued to consider himself the valid leader of all genuine Mariavites. Freed from the restraining influences of much of the clergy, formerly subordinate to him, he made ever more radical pronouncements, including the view that Kozłowska had in fact been the "incarnation of the Holy Spirit on earth".

In 1940, during the German occupation of Poland in World War II, Kowalski was arrested by the Gestapo and taken to the Dachau concentration camp. He died in a German Nazi extermination facility in 1942. His leadership in the church passed to his widow, Maria Izabela Wiłucka-Kowalska, who was already a consecrated bishop. She held the position until her own death in 1946.

== Present day ==
The Catholic Mariavite Church continues to this day at its base in Felicjanów. It appears not to have adherents outside Poland, unlike the larger Old Catholic Mariavite Church. Never large to begin with (perhaps 3,000 members at its founding). It considers itself now a true church movement, and regards ecumenism to be mostly unnecessary, since true believers are to be found within its ranks. This insularity contributes to a general inability for the group to be penetrated by outsiders or to learn details such as its actual current size. The church is currently headed by a female bishop. The church continues to be characterised by its very liberal theology, unlike the Old Catholic Mariavite Church, which has significantly reverted to a conservative view of liturgy and theology and the traditional practice of excluding women from ordination.

== Bishops ==
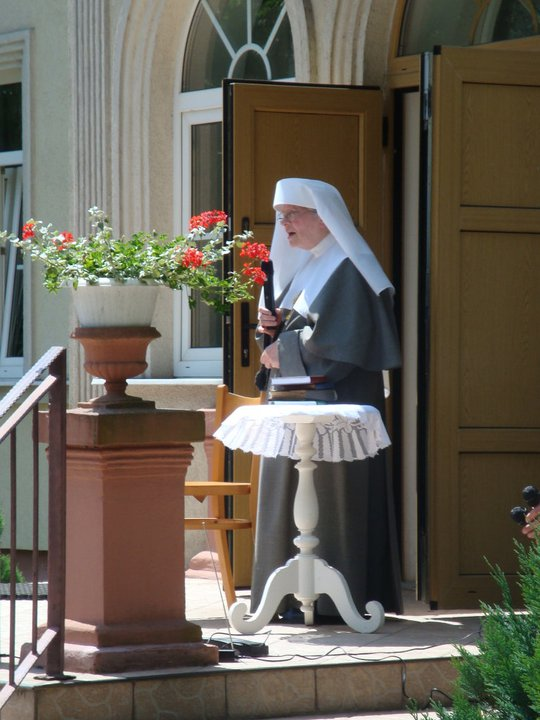
Bishop Maria Beatrycze Szulgowicz of the Catholic Mariavite Church

- 1935 – 1942: Jan Maria Michał Kowalski
- 1940 – 1946: Maria Izabela Wiłucka-Kowalska
- 1949 – 2005: Maria Rafael Wojciechowski (Note: Maas consecrated Wojciechowski on 25 November 1956 in Felicjanow.)
- 2005: Maria Beatrycze Szulgowicz

== Administration ==
- Two custodies with 16 parishes
