= Kozlovsky (surname) =

Kozlovsky (masculine) or Kozlovskaya (feminine) is an East Slavic surname. Notable people with the surname include:

- Alexander Kozlovsky (disambiguation), several people
- Alexei Fedorovich Kozlovsky (1905–1977), Russian composer
- Alexei Ivanovich Kozlovsky (1932–1996), Ukrainian foreman
- Alexei Semyonovich Kozlovsky (1707–1776), Russian statesman
- Alfred Kozlovsky (1929–2013), Ukrainian metallurgist
- Danila Kozlovsky (born 1985), Russian actor
- Dmitrii Kozlovskii (born 1999), Russian pair skater
- Eugene Kozlovsky (1946–2023), Russian writer, journalist
- Ivan Kozlovsky (1900–1993), Soviet singer (tenor)
- Marina Kozlovskaya (1925–2019), Soviet Russian painter
- Mikhail Kozlovsky (1753–1802), Russian sculptor
- Ondřej Kozlovský (born 1982), Czech bobsledder
- Osip Kozlovsky (1757–1831), Russian composer
- Pavel Pavlovich Kozlovsky (born 1942), Soviet and Belarusian general and politician
- Pyotr Kozlovsky (1783–1840), Russian diplomat and man of letters
- Valentina Kozlovskaya (1938–2025), Russian chess player
- William P. Kozlovsky, American rear admiral

== See also ==
- Kozłowski, a Polish last name
