= Tribus circiter =

1906 papal encyclical on the Mariavites

Tribus circiter Latin for 'About three [years ago]' Encyclical of Pope Pius X
- Signature date: 5 April 1906
- Subject: Mariavites
- Number: 7 of 17 of the pontificate
- Text: In Latin; In English

Tribus circiter is Pope Pius X's 1906 encyclical, to the archbishops of Warsaw and bishops of Płock and Lublin, about the Mariavites or Mystic Priests of Poland, an association of secular priests that the document describes as "a kind of pseudo-monastic society". The association of secular priests and the Mariavite movement was founded by Feliksa Kozłowska and later broke away from the Catholic Church to become the Mariavite Church.

== History of the Mariavites ==
According to Tribus circiter, the Holy See was informed, c. 1901, that priests, "especially among the junior clergy of" the Warsaw, Płock, and Lublin dioceses "founded, without permission from their lawful superiors, a kind of pseudo-monastic society, known as the Mariavites or Mystic Priests;" and, that the members turned "from the obedience they owe the bishops... and became vain in their thoughts."

The association's members proclaimed Kozłowska "to be most holy, marvelously endowed with heavenly gifts, divinely enlightened about many things, and providentially given for the salvation of a world about to perish, they did not hesitate to entrust themselves without reserve, and to obey her every wish".

"Relying on an alleged mandate from God," the association's members promoted "without discrimination and of their own initiative among the people frequent exercises of piety", which Pius called "highly commendable when rightly carried out," and they particularly promoted Eucharistic adoration and frequent communion; "but at the same time they made... charges against" clergy who either doubted Kozłowska's "sanctity and divine election" or were hostile "to the society of the Mariavites." Pius believed "that there was reason to fear that many of the faithful in their delusion were about to abandon their" pastors, or, in other words, commit schism. In Faith and Fatherland, Brian Porter described "without discrimination and of their own initiative" as a key phrase in the document because Mariavites "did not merely bypass the hierarchical institutions of the Church; they denied that doctrinal and devotional issues ought to be channeled through them. They saw priests as moral guides, justified by their personal holiness rather than their office."

== Condemnation of the Mariavites ==
On September 4, 1904, Pius issued a decree "suppressing the above-named society of priests, and commanding them to break off... all relations with" Kozłowska: "But the priests in question, notwithstanding that they signed a document expressing their subjection to the authority of their bishops and that perhaps they did,... partly break off their relations with" Kozłowska, but they did not disband or "renounce sincerely the condemned association. Not only did they condemn" the bishops'"exhortations and inhibitions, not only did "many of them sign as audacious declaration in which they rejected communion with their bishops, not only... did they incite the deluded people to drive away their lawful pastors, but, like the enemies of the Church, asserted that she has fallen from truth and justice, and hence has been abandoned by the Holy Spirit, and that to themselves alone, the Mariavite priests, was it divinely given to instruct the faithful in true piety". Porter wrote that Pius recognized that what they did "was unimpeachable on the surface" but "undermined by their attacks on the hierarchy".

== Kowalski and Próchniewski ==
Some weeks before the encyclical was given at Rome, two Mariavite priests Roman Maria Jakub Próchniewski and Jan Maria Michał Kowalski who "is recognized, in virtue of some kind of delegation from" Kozłowska, "as their Superior by all the members of the Society. Both of them, in a petition alleged by them to have been written by the express order of... Jesus Christ, ask [Pius] or the Congregation of the Holy Office in his name, to issue a document" that Kozłowska had "'been made most holy by God, that she is the mother of mercy for all men called and elected to salvation by God in these days; and that all Mariavite priests are commanded by God to promote throughout the world devotion to the Most Holy Sacrament and to the Blessed Virgin Mary of Perpetual Succor, free from all restriction of ecclesiastical or human law or custom, and from all ecclesiastical and human power whatsoever...'"

Pius believe that Kowalski and Próchniewski "were blinded... by ignorance and delusion," so he urged them:

- "to put away the deceits of vain revelation"
- "to subject themselves and their works to the... authority of their superiors"
- "to hasten the return of the faithful of Christ to the safe path of obedience and reverence towards their pastors"
- "to leave to... the Holy See and the other competent authorities the task of confirming" pious customs
- "to admonish any priests who were found guilty of speaking abusively or contemptuously of devout practices and exercises approved by the Church"

Porter believed, "The vital doctrinal point [was that Mariavites] were accused of demanding that priests be morally pure, and they refused to recognize the authority of anyone in the hierarchy who fell short of their rigorous moral standards. They were, in effect, repudiating the ecclesiological validity of the clergy by implicitly denying that the Church's sacramental power alone was adequate to legitimate a priest". According to Porter, Honorat Koźmiński, who was at one time Kozłowska's confessor, described, in Prawda o "Maryawitach", "how some minor doctrinal errors in Kozłowska's thinking grew over time into 'Satanic delusions'". Porter wrote that Koźmiński argued that a principal element of their movement "was an ecclesiological error: 'The rebellious priests taught in a heretical manner that those bishops and priests who did not live in accordance with what [the Mariavites] considered to be appropriate rules for a chaplain lost the power to govern [their subordinates].'" The Church has opposed revivals of Donatism, which is a principal element of the Mariavites, for centuries. Porter explains that while it was acceptable to confine criticism to individual priests, it was unacceptable to express "a systematic critique of the clergy" in a way which "undermined the holiness of the Church" or "challenged the validity of the sacraments".

According to Tribus circiter, Kowalski and Próchniewski resolved in a written statement, the following:

- to revoke their February 1906 declaration of separation from Vincent Theophilus Popiel, archbishop of Warsaw
- to profess their "wish to be... united with" their "bishops, and especially with" Popiel
- to profess their "obedience and subjection in the name... of all the Mariavites", including the Mariavites of Płock, "who, for the same cause as the Mariavites of Warsaw, handed their bishop a declaration of separation from him" and "all the Adorers of the Most Holy Sacrament"
- to profess "love and obedience to the Holy See, and" Pius
- to "ask pardon for any pain" they "may have caused" Pius
- to work "to restore peace between the people and their bishops immediately"

Pius believed that after their pardon, Kowalski and Próchniewski would return to Poland and act on their promises. Thus, Pius advised the bishops "to receive them and their companions, now that they professed... obedience to your authority,... to restore them legally, if their acts corresponded with their promises, to their faculties for exercising their priestly functions".

Pius was aware at the time Tribus circiter was promulgated that Kowalski and Próchniewski had relapsed and "again opened their minds to lying revelations" and had not demonstrated "the respect and obedience they promised, but... they have written to their companions a letter... opposed to truth and genuine obedience."

Pius pointed out the vanity of a "profession of fidelity" when those who profess "do not cease to violate the authority of their bishops. For 'by far the most august part of the Church consists of the bishops,... hence, whoever resists them or pertinaciously refuses obedience to them puts himself apart from the Church.... On the other hand, to pass judgment upon or to rebuke the acts of bishops does not at all belong to private individuals.... At most, it is allowed in matters of grave complaint to refer the whole case to the Roman Pontiff'."

Pius called Kowalski's exhortation "to his companions in error on behalf of peace... idle and deceitful" while Kowalski "persists in his... incitements to rebellion against legitimate pastors and in brazen violation of episcopal commands."

Pius wrote "that the faithful of Christ and all the so-called Mariavite priests who are in good faith may no longer be led astray by" Kozłowska and Kowalski's delusions. He reconfirmed the suppression and condemnation of the group, which he wrote was "unlawfully and invalidly founded", and Pius also reconfirmed that all priests are prohibited "to have anything whatever to do on any pretext with" Kozłowska. (Note: An exception was made for the bishop of Płock to appoint a confessor to Kozłowska. The original Latin, "Plocensis Episcopus", is transliterated in the Vatican website English version as "Bishop of Plotsk" instead of "Bishop of Płock".)

== Concluding words ==
Pius exhorted the bishops "to embrace" those priests who "sincerely repent" "and not to refuse to" recall them "to their priestly duties, when they have been duly proved worthy". About those priests who reject the bishops' "exhortations and persevere in their contumacy", Pius will "see that they are severely dealt with". Pius instructed the bishops "to lead" those faithful "who are now laboring under a delusion that may be pardoned... back to the right path" and to foster approved pious practices in their dioceses.
