= Maria Franciszka Kozłowska =

Founder of Polish Catholic renewal (1862–1921)

- Mateczka ("Little Mother")
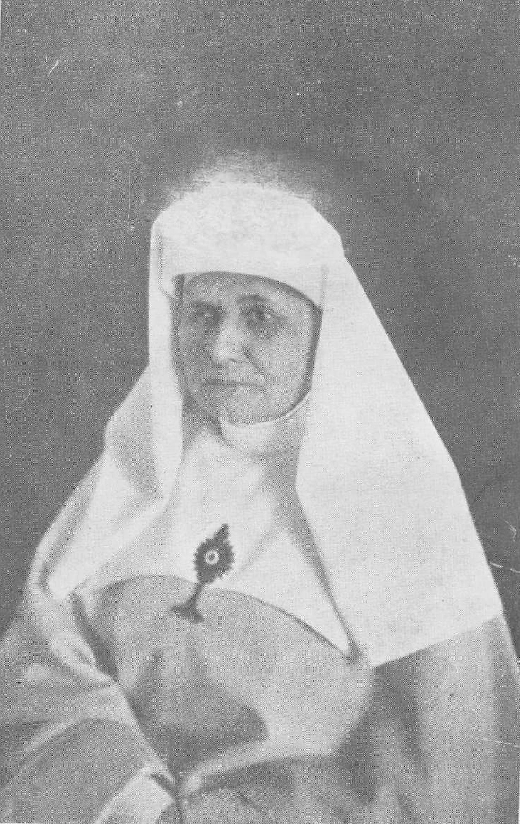
- Church: Mariavite

Personal details
- Born: Feliksa Magdalena Kozłowska; 27 May 1862 Wieliczna, Poland
- Died: 23 August 1921 (aged 59) Płock, Second Polish Republic
- Buried: Temple of Mercy and Charity, Płock, Poland; 52.548°N 19.680°E
- Denomination: Old Catholic Mariavite Church
- Residence: Poland

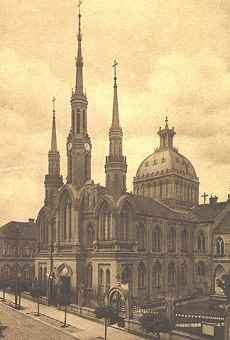
The main Mariavite House of Worship, Temple of Mercy and Charity in Płock, Poland

Feliksa Magdalena Kozłowska (27 May 1862 – 23 August 1921), known by the religious name Maria Franciszka and the epithet "Mateczka", was a Polish religious sister, Christian mystic and visionary who founded a movement of renewal in the Roman Catholic church in the Congress Kingdom of Poland (founded in the Russian Partition of Poland). It was to follow the simplicity of the life of Mary, mother of Jesus. Early in the 20th century, she and this movement were excommunicated and became an autonomous church in fellowship with the Old Catholic Church of the Netherlands. In 1935 it split in two and became the Old Catholic Mariavite Church and the Catholic Mariavite Church. Both denominations were part of a single schism from the Catholic Church which declared it as heretical in 1906.

== Early life ==
Feliksa Kozłowska was born in Wieliczna near Węgrów, into an impoverished Szlachta family, bearing the Nalecz coat-of-arms. She was eight months old when her father, Jakub, died in the January Uprising. She was raised by her mother, and paternal step-grandparents, called Pułaski. They lived with those relatives first in Czerwonka węgrowska, and later in Baczki. After home tuition, she graduated from a high school in Warsaw, speaking fluent Russian, English and French. Her first job was as a governess to the family of a general. By all accounts, she was an attractive and accomplished woman who rejected at least one offer of marriage. She planned instead to join the enclosed Visitation Sisters in Warsaw. However, due to tsarist regulations relating to religious orders, it proved impossible. At the age of nineteen, she entered the recently formed Congregation of the Franciscan Sisters of the Afflicted founded by Honorat Koźmiński, whose purpose was to care for the sick. Three years later, she evinced the need for more contemplation and a less busy setting. With permission from fr. Koźmiński, she left the Franciscan sisters.

On 8 September 1887, she formed on Koźmiński's advice, with five other women, a covert religious community in the ancient city of Płock and went to live with them. They followed Franciscan spirituality and supported themselves with embroidery of church vestments. The income was very modest resulting in a relatively strict regime, abstaining from all meat and fish. She became superior of the new community, called the Congregation of Sisters of the Poor of Saint Mother Clare and took the religious name Maria Franciszka. The congregation followed the Rule of Saint Francis and added a fourth vow in addition to the conventional three. It was the promise to engage in perpetual Adoration of the Blessed Sacrament. In time the needlework brought in commissions from wealthy clients which improved the material position of the women, while Kozłowska fostered their spiritual development.

In 1890 her widowed mother, Anna Kozłowska, having sold her properties in Warsaw, decided to move to Płock and live with her daughter. Initially, Anna had opposed her only daughter's desire to become a nun, as she foresaw a better future for her in marriage, rather than grinding poverty in a convent. She eventually relented and decided to join her daughter's community. In 1903 she made her religious profession by adopting the name, Maria Hortulana

=== Rift with Koźmiński and the beginning of the Mariavite movement ===
To begin with fr. Koźmiński had been very pleased with Franciszka's religious progress. Nonetheless, in 1902, when she was forty years old, relations with her mentor broke down irretrievably. The reasons were that he disapproved of the attitude of some of his clerical brethren who, though educated and pious, had fallen under her spell and took spiritual direction from a woman. Another difficulty had been her introduction of certain religious practices without his leave.

In 1893, Kozłowska reported that she had experienced religious visions. The first vision supposedly instructed her to form a new clergy order with the primary goal of propagating the Adoration of the Blessed Sacrament and devotion to Our Lady of Perpetual Succour. They became known as "Mariavites", taking their inspiration from imitating the life of Mary. The group broadened its appeal in the first ten years, and in 1903, it attempted to gain canonical status within the Catholic Church. Having first met her at Christmas 1901, Father Jan Kowalski led the delegation under his newly assumed religious name, Maria Michał Kowalski. Kozłowska, not wishing to create difficulties with the church authorities, largely stayed out of public view and left the structural and political implications of the movement to others, particularly to Kowalski.

== Attempt at recognition ==
In an effort to regularise the movement in the eyes of the Catholic Church, the group submitted documents to the local Bishop of Płock, in whose diocese Kozłowska lived and to two leading archbishops. The latter two rejected the idea out of hand, but the Płock authorities set up a Canonical Inquisition into the movement. To expedite matters, Kowalski led a delegation of Mariavites to the Holy See in 1903 but was delayed by a Conclave. Eventually, they were able to meet with Pope Pius X in 1904. Kowalski and his fellow Mariavites were severely disappointed when, in August 1904, the Congregation of the Roman and Universal Inquisition (CRUI) concluded that Kozłowska's "visions" were mere hallucinations.

In April 1906, Pius X issued an encyclical, Tribus circiter, which excommunicated Kozłowska and her followers. It also harshly criticised her followers for treating her as a living saint and on par with the Blessed Virgin. In December 1906, the CRUI excommunicated Kozłowska and Kowalski by name as well as their adherents and supporters. This marked the first instance in history where an individual woman was excommunicated by name as a heretic in contrast, to being excommunicated by virtue of her membership of a group deemed to be heretical.

== Independence ==
In November 1906, only a month prior to the ex-communication from the Catholic Church, the Russian government granted the movement official status in the part of Poland under its control after the October Manifesto granting everyone freedom of religion and so a split in the Polish Roman Catholic Church (her enemies supported the idea that could help foster a split in manifest Polish nationalism as well). Having already been in touch with the Union of Utrecht of the Old Catholic Churches, the Mariavites were invited to attend their 1909 Congress in Utrecht, at which Kowalski was elevated to the rank of bishop, granting him the power of the apostolic succession. In 1912, the Mariavite church gained full recognition as a legal denomination in the Russian partition of Poland. They had already begun work on their own cathedral in Płock, the Temple of Mercy and Charity. They had as many as 50,000 to 60,000 adherents distributed over sixteen parishes and increased further during World War I. At its probable peak in 1917, the church may have had up to 160,000 adherents.

In 1918, Kozłowska revealed the contents of her final vision. The following year, two years prior to her death, the Mariavites adopted the name, Old Catholic Mariavite Church.

== Legacy and myth ==
Following the end of World War I the Second Polish Republic was established. A rise in hostility toward them by the new government caused a decline in Mariavite fortunes and membership declined, with many returning to Catholicism. This trend accelerated in 1921 after Kozłowska died and Kowalski succeeded her as the church's guiding spirit and formal leader.

Kowalski published a biography of Kozłowska with a compilation of her visions and tried to keep her memory alive in the minds of followers while making her authority over her followers his own. The hagiographic nature of this work and the "elevation" of Kozłowska to a status apparently co-equal with that of the Blessed Virgin Mary, if not with the Holy Spirit, was excessive even to many Mariavites. This undermined Kowalski's credibility with the faithful and precipitated the eventual split in the movement. Many of the factual details about Kozłowska's life remained unclear, and some of the myths surrounding her were perpetuated by Kowalski.

== See also ==
- List of people who have been considered deities

== Bibliography ==
- Catholic Church. Congregatio Romanae et Universalis Inquisitionis (1906-12-05). "Excommunicantur J. Kowalski et M. F. Kozlowska [Mariavitarum sacerdotum secta]". The Ecclesiastical Review (in Latin and English). 36 (4). Philadelphia: American Ecclesiastical Review. ISSN 0002-8274.
- Peterkiewicz, Jerzy (1975). The third Adam. London: Oxford University Press. ISBN 9780192121981.
- "Kozłowska Feliksa Magdalena". Internetowa encyklopedia PWN (in Polish). Warsawa, PL: Wydawnictwo Naukowe PWN. OCLC 644242944. Archived from the original on 2015-12-14.
