= Temple of Mercy and Charity =

Coordinates: 52.5475°N 19.6803°E

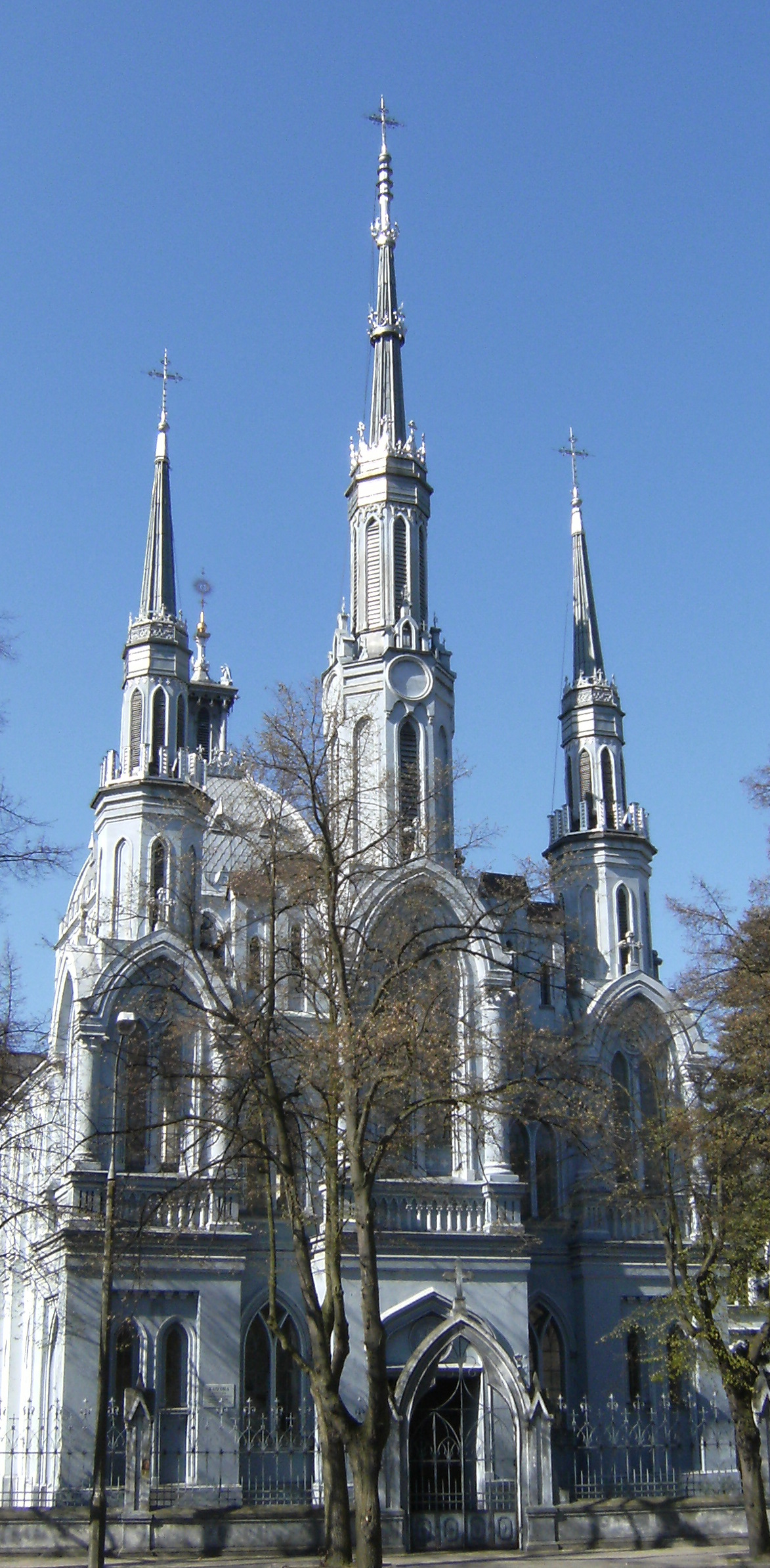
Temple of Mercy and Charity in Płock

The Temple of Mercy and Charity (Polish: Świątynia Miłosierdzia i Miłości) is a Mariavite cathedral in Płock, Poland. It is located near the Vistula River.

== Significance ==
The Temple is the religious center of the Mariavite Church in Poland. It contains the tomb of its founder Feliksa Kozłowska, as well as a memorial plaque commemorating its first leader Jan Maria Michał Kowalski. It is also the focus of pilgrimages by followers of the Mariavite Church. The main religious celebration occurs on August 15, the date of the Assumption of the Virgin Mary, which also coincides with the consecration of the church. It is also notable for being one of the few English neo-Gothic buildings in Poland.

== Architecture ==
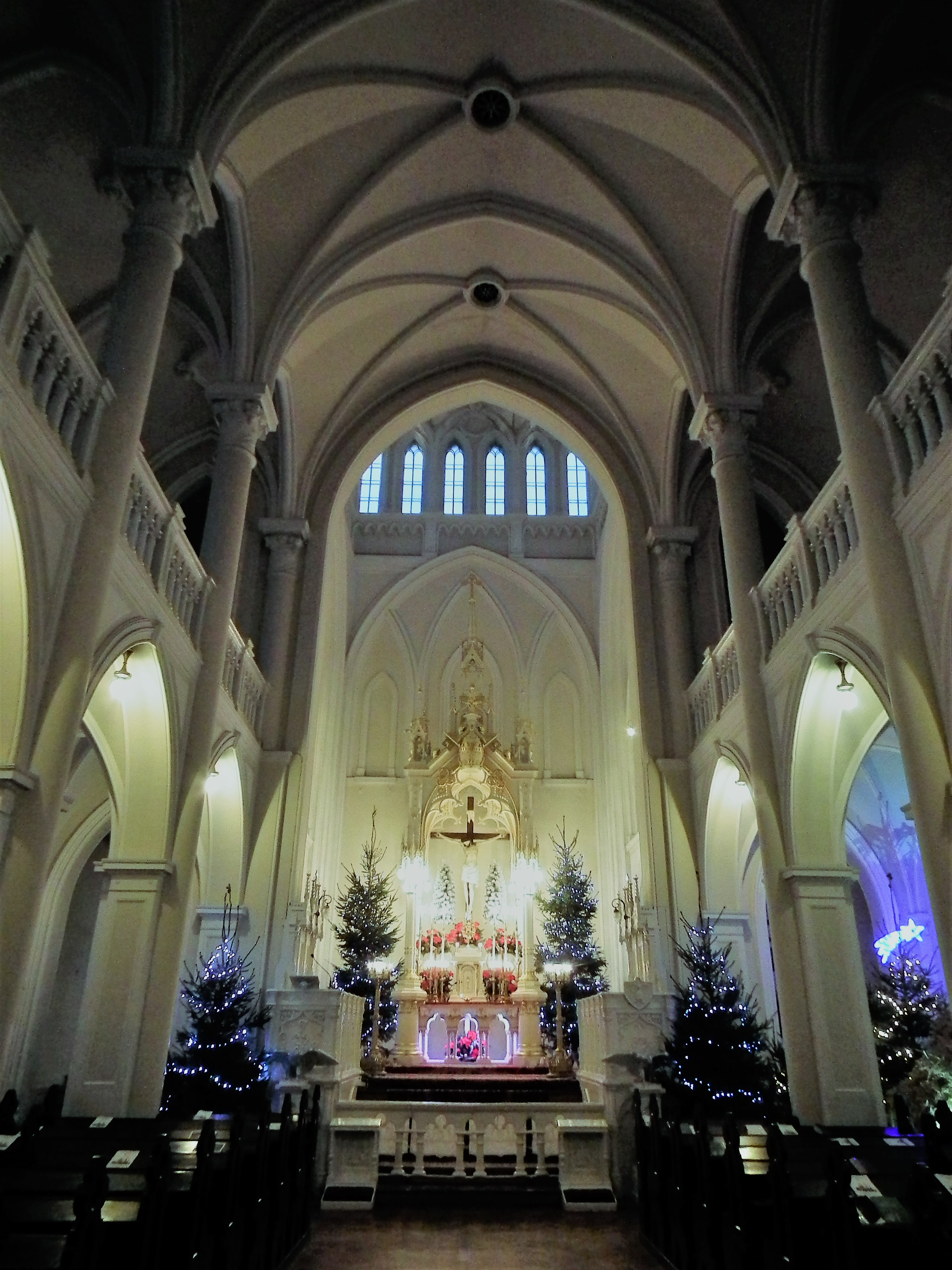
Main altar in the Temple of Mercy and Charity, Płock

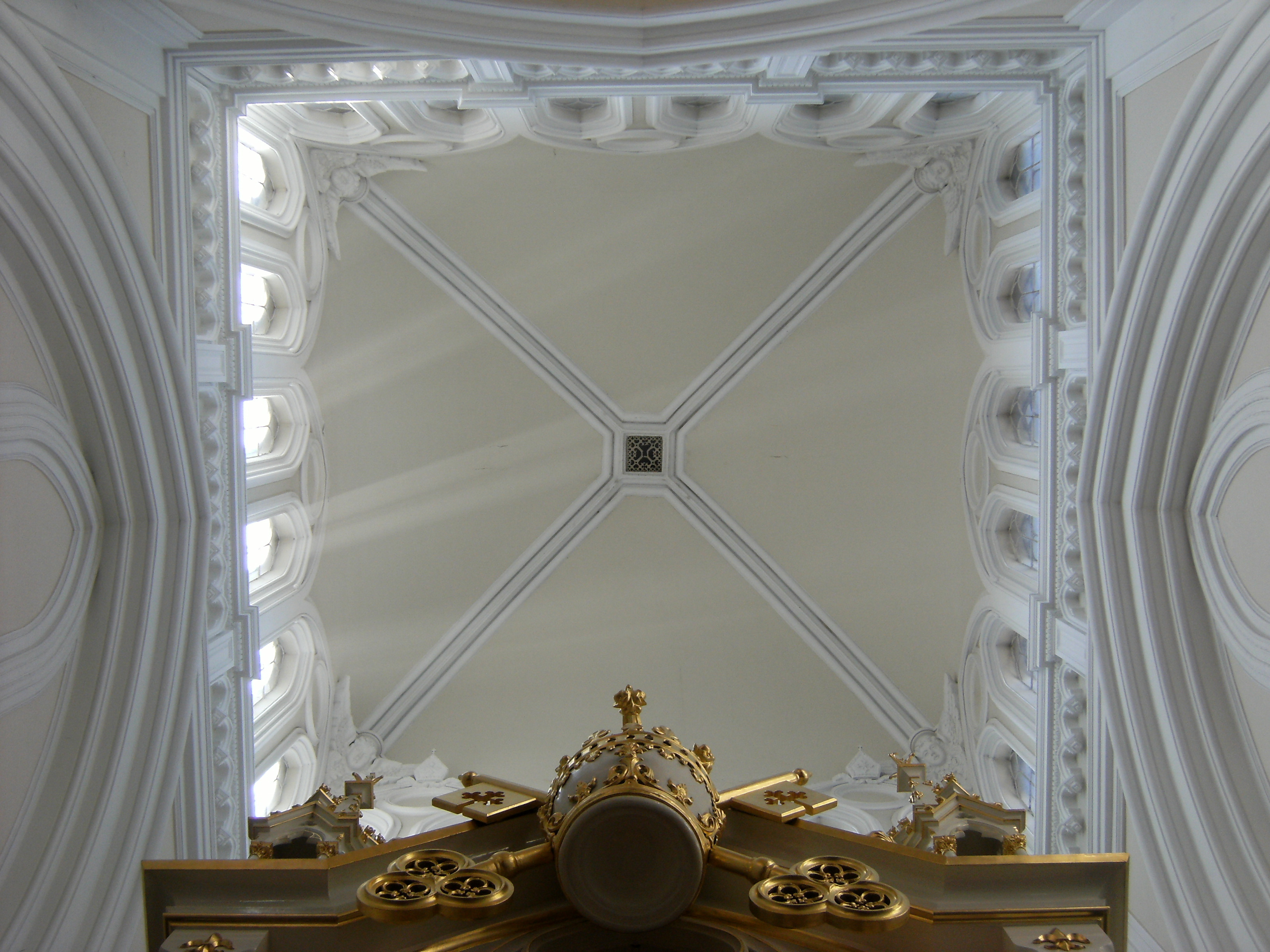
Inside the square dome of the Temple

The church was built on the site of a small manor with two annexes which was purchased in 1902 by the movement's founder Feliksa Kozłowska. The temple's construction took place from 1911 to 1914 and was financed chiefly from collections from the Mariavite community.

The Temple was designed in English Neo-Gothic style, according to instructions issued by Feliksa Kozłowska and conveyed by Bishop Maria Michał Kowalski. All technical aspects of the plans were supervised and corrected by two experienced architect and engineer Mariavite priests, Wacław Przysiecki and Feliks Szymanowski.

The church itself is built on an E- shaped plan to symbolize the word Eucharist. Perched on top of the main dome is a gigantic monstrance adorned by four angels, each measuring almost 4 feet in height. The following sentence is carved underneath: "Adorujmy Chrystusa Króla panującego nad narodami", which in English translates as "Let us adore Christ the King who reigneth over all nations". On top each of its three slim steeples are crowns, with three more on the central steeple and one on each of the side ones.

The exterior is grey/blue in colour, whereas inside, it is full of natural light and dazzling white. The interior is free of any excessive ornamentation and has no side altars. The focus of the building is to direct attention solely towards the main altar in the centre of the temple. A gilded baldaquin rests on top of four pillars. A papal tiara and the Keys of St. Peter are fixed to the baldaquin's front to symbolize that in the Mariavite Church, the highest authority is in Jesus, continuously present in the church signified by the fervent adoration of the Blessed Sacrament. On either side of the altar are Gothic stalls where Mariavite clergy sit during religious services. The doors, pews and floors of the Temple of Mercy and Charity are all carved in solid oak.

In addition to the remains of Feliksa Kozłowska, the Temple crypt also houses the tombs of several Mariavite bishops.

== Gallery ==
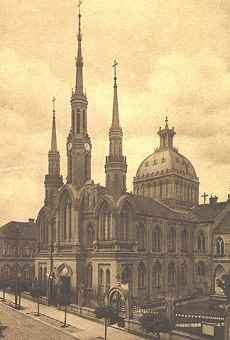

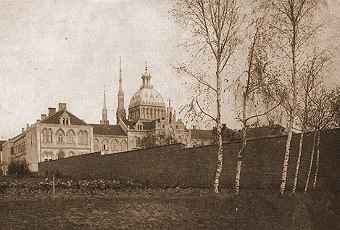

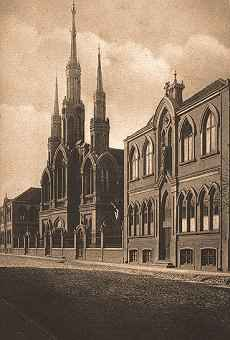

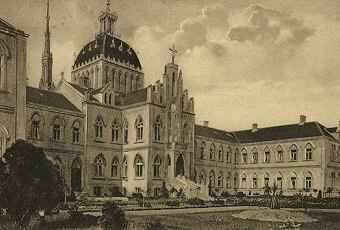

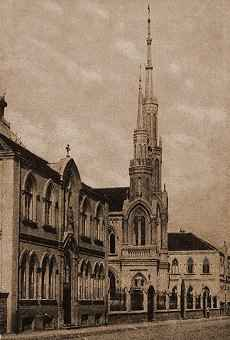

== Sources ==
- Liniewicz, Łukasz (2013). Mariavitism: Mystical, Social, National. A Polish Religious Answer to the Challenges of Modernity (M.A. thesis). Tilburg University.
