= Kazlauskas =

Kazlauskas (feminine forms of this family name - Kazlauskaitė, Kazlauskienė) is the most common surname in Lithuania. It may refer to:

- Charles Kazlauskas (b. 1982), American association football player of Lithuanian descent
- Donatas Kazlauskas (b. 1994), Lithuanian footballer
- Jonas Kazlauskas (b. 1954), Lithuanian professional basketball coach and player
- Jonas Kazlauskas (linguist) (1930–70), Lithuanian linguist, expert on Baltic languages
- Marius Kazlauskas (b. 1984), Lithuanian football player
- Nomeda Kazlaus (Kazlauskaitė), Lithuanian dramatic soprano
- Valdas Kazlauskas (b. 1958), Lithuanian race-walker
