= William P. Kozlovsky =

American Coast Guard admiral (1932–2025)

- Born: March 24, 1932; Antigo, Wisconsin, U.S.
- Died: May 11, 2025 (aged 93); San Jose, California, U.S.
- Education: United States Coast Guard Academy; Air War College; Purdue University
- Military career
- Allegiance: United States
- Branch: United States Coast Guard
- Rank: Rear admiral
- Awards: Legion of Merit; Meritorious Service Medal; Air Medal; Coast Guard Commendation Medal; Coast Guard Achievement Medal

William Patrick Kozlovsky (March 24, 1932 – May 11, 2025) was a rear admiral in the United States Coast Guard. He was a native of Wausau, Wisconsin.

== Career ==
Kozlovsky graduated first in his class from the United States Coast Guard Academy in 1954. He then served aboard the USCGC Gresham (WAVP-387) until 1956.

From 1960 to 1962, Kozlovsky was a search and rescue pilot based out of Coast Guard Air Station San Francisco. Later, he was stationed at Coast Guard Air Station Barbers Point. Additionally, he graduated from the Air War College.

He graduated first in his class from Purdue University in 1963.

Kozlovsky's later assignments included Chief of the Budge Division of the Coast Guard from 1973 to 1976, Comptroller of the Coast Guard from 1980 to 1986 and Chief of the Office of Acquisition of the Coast Guard from 1986 to 1987.

Awards he received during his career include the Legion of Merit, the Meritorious Service Medal, the Air Medal, the Coast Guard Commendation Medal and the Coast Guard Achievement Medal.

He died in San Jose, California, on May 11, 2025, at the age of 93.
