= Agnieszka Kozłowska-Rajewicz =

Polish politician and biologist (born 1969)

Agnieszka Kozlowska-Rajewicz MEP
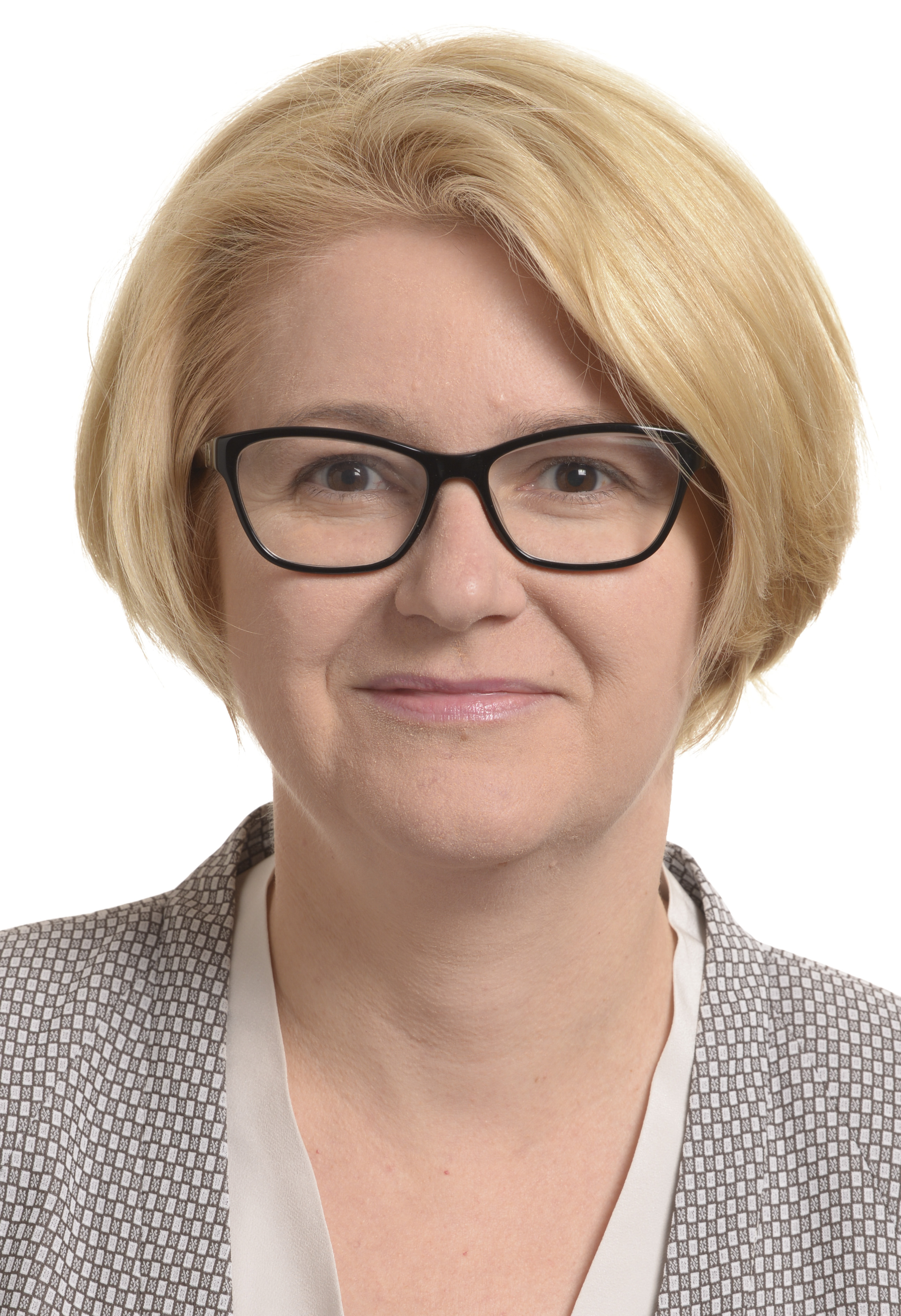

Member of the European Parliament
- Incumbent
- Assumed office 1 July 2014
- Constituency: Greater Poland

Personal details
- Born: 4 December 1969 (age 56) Kętrzyn, Warmian-Masurian Voivodeship, Poland
- Party: Polish: Civic Platform; EU: European People's Party

Agnieszka Kozłowska-Rajewicz (born 4 December 1969) is a Polish politician and biology academic, who served as a Member of the European Parliament (MEP) during the eighth term from 2014 till 2019 representing Greater Poland. She is a member of the Civic Platform, part of the European People's Party.

== Education and early career ==
Kozłowska-Rajewicz received a Master's degree in biology with a specialisation in human biology from Adam Mickiewicz University in Poznań in 1994. She subsequently undertook postgraduate study in public relations at the Higher School of Management and Banking before completing her doctorate in human biology in 1998 at the Adam Mickiewicz University in Poznań.

=== Academic roles ===
Kozłowska-Rajewicz was an assistant professor, Institute of Anthropology, Faculty of Biology at the Adam Mickiewicz University in Poznań from 1998 until 2004. From 2002 until 2006 she was chair of the Polish Anthropological Branch in Poznań. From 2005 until 2011 she was assistant professor, Faculty of Educational Studies, Adam Mickiewicz University and head of the Laboratory of Environmental Education, Poznań.

She has also authored or co-authored several biology textbooks. Since 2016 she has been a senior lecturer in the Faculty of Educational Studies at the Adam Mickiewicz University in Poznań.

== Political career ==
Kozłowska-Rajewicz first entered politics in 2006 as a member of the Poznań County District Council. She served for three years as Secretary of State in the Prime Minister's Chancellery as Government Plenipotentiary for Equal Treatment. She also served as a member of the Council for the Prevention of Racial Discrimination, Xenophobia and Related Intolerance.

She was elected as a member of the European Parliament in 2014.

=== Parliamentary service ===
- Member, Committee on Employment and Social Affairs (2014–)
- Member, Committee on Women's Rights and Gender Equality (2014–)
- Member, Delegation for relations with Belarus (2014–)
- Member, Delegation to the Euronest Parliamentary Assembly (2014–)
