= Alexander Kozlovsky =

Alexander Kozlovsky may refer to:

- Alexander Kozlovsky (general) (1864–1940), Russian general, took part in the Kronstadt rebellion
- Alexander Kozlovsky (politician, born 1944), Russian politician
- Alexander Kozlovsky (politician, born 1973), Russian politician
