= Kozlovsky, Republic of Bashkortostan =

Kozlovsky Козловский
- Village
- Location within Bashkortostan Location within Russia
- Coordinates: 53°31′N 56°08′E
- Country: Russia
- Region: Bashkortostan
- District: Ishimbaysky District
- Time zone: UTC+5:00

Kozlovsky (Russian: Козловский) is a rural locality (a village) in Urman-Bishkadaksky Selsoviet, Ishimbaysky District, Bashkortostan, Russia. The population was 4 as of 2010. There is 1 street.

== Geography ==
Kozlovsky is located 15 km northeast of Ishimbay (the district's administrative centre) by road. Novogeorgiyevka is the nearest rural locality.
