= Kozlovskaya, Arkhangelsk Oblast =

Kozlovskaya Козловская
- Village
- Location within Arkhangelsk Oblast Location within Russia
- Coordinates: 61°06′N 42°50′E
- Country: Russia
- Region: Arkhangelsk Oblast
- District: Velsky District
- Time zone: UTC+3:00

Kozlovskaya (Russian: Козловская) is a rural locality (a village) in Rakulo-Kokshengskoye Rural Settlement of Velsky District, Arkhangelsk Oblast, Russia. The population was 263 as of 2014. There are 8 streets.

== Geography ==
Kozlovskaya is located 50 km east of Velsk (the district's administrative centre) by road. Turovskaya is the nearest rural locality.
