= Mariavite Church =

Independent Christian church

Old Catholic Mariavite Church
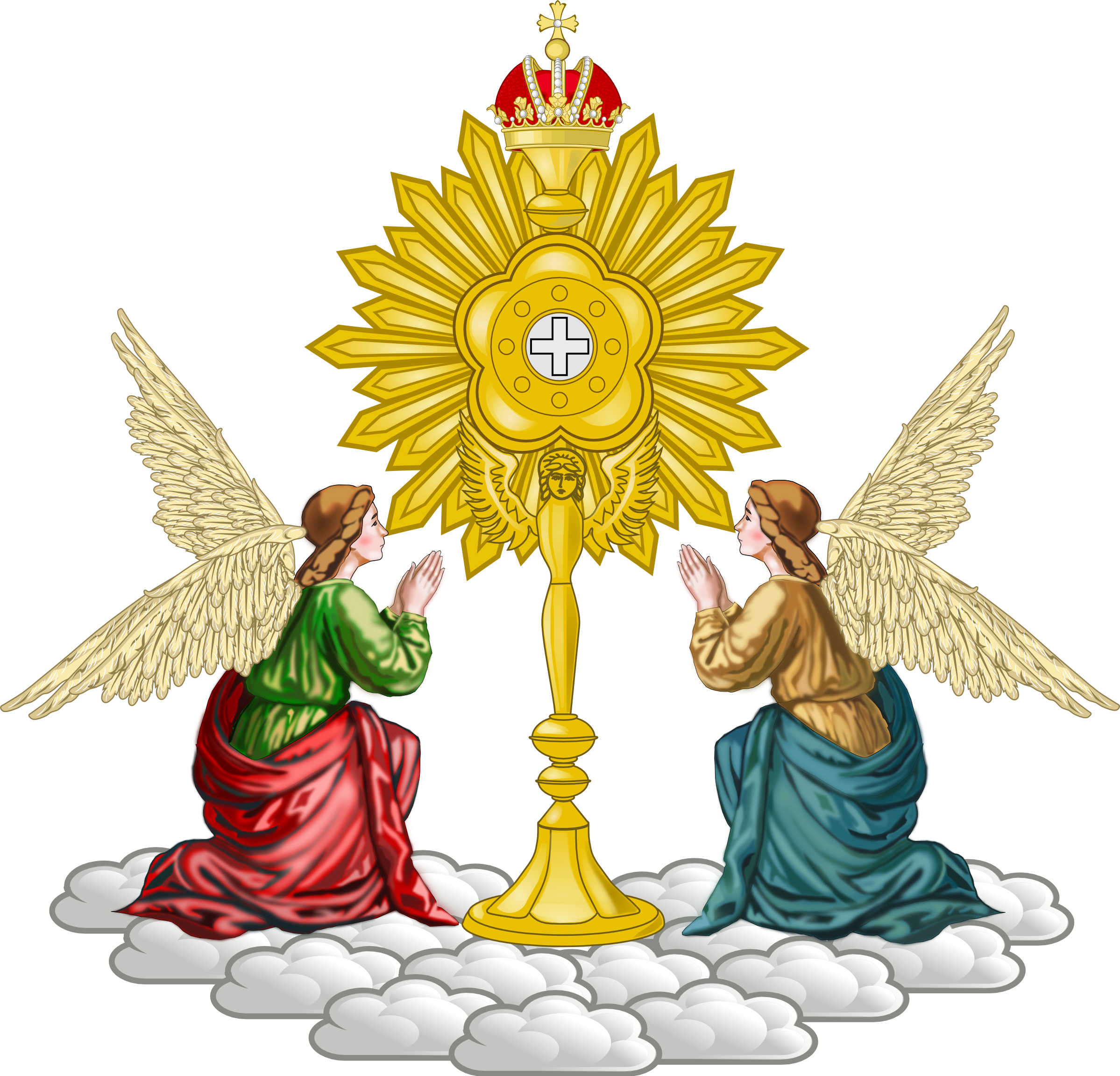
- Mariavite emblem
- Classification: Independent Catholic
- Orientation: Old Catholicism
- Theology: Mariavitism
- Polity: Episcopal
- Prime bishop: Jarosław Maria Jan Opala
- Associations: World Council of Churches; Conference of European Churches; Polish Ecumenical Council
- Region: Poland and France
- Headquarters: Płock, Poland
- Founder: Maria Franciszka Kozłowska
- Origin: 1906; Płock, Poland
- Separated from: Roman Catholic church
- Separations: Catholic Mariavite Church
- Congregations: 44 parishes (2011)
- Members: 23,436 in Poland (2011)
- Ministers: 8 bishops; 25 priests
- Other name: Old Catholic Church of the Mariavites
- Official website: mariawita.pl

The Old Catholic Mariavite Church refers to one of two independent Christian churches, both of which can be dated from 1906 but which became distinct after 1935 as a result of doctrinal differences, and are collectively known as Mariavites. Mariavitism had first emerged from the religious inspiration of Polish noblewoman and nun Feliksa Kozłowska (1862–1921) living in the Congress Kingdom of Poland in the late 19th-century. A young Catholic priest from a modest background, Jan Maria Michał Kowalski (1871–1942), became convinced by Kozłowska's revelations and adopted her vision as his own project by her side.

The movement represented an ideology whose aim was to imitate the simplicity of the life of Mary, in Latin, qui Mariae vitam imitantur, ("Let them imitate the Life of Mary"), thus vita Mariae, the Life of Mary, gave the movement its name. The movement became the subject of two papal bulls in 1906 which resulted in the mass excommunication from the Catholic Church of both clergy and lay adherents to the movement.

The leaders of the movement sought theological sanctuary with the Old Catholic Church of the Netherlands which, after negotiations welcomed them and in 1909 granted both recognition and apostolic succession to what by default had become a new catholic church, the "Mariavite Church", with the power to confer holy orders. It therefore became a separate and independent religious denomination in Poland. It continued as a unitary church until 1935 when a faction led by bishop Filip Feldman challenged the church leader, Michał Kowalski, and successfully expelled him and his loyalists from the headquarters in the Polish city of Płock, thereby creating two Mariavite churches.

== History ==
=== Polish Roman Catholic Church under Russian rule ===
From 1795 the territory of the Polish–Lithuanian Commonwealth had been partitioned between the three neighbouring powers, the Austrian Empire, the Kingdom of Prussia and the Russian Empire. Under the Russian Empire (that annexed former eastern territories) the Russian Orthodox Church became the established church, but in the "confederated" Congress Kingdom of Poland the Polish Catholic religion continued to be the official Church.

After the 1863 January Uprising, the tsarist authorities forbade the establishment of any new Polish organisations. Religious orders were often banned or exiled. Catholic clergy in the Russian Partition could not be locally educated, in contrast to the priests in the Austrian and Prussian Partitions. The only authorized Roman Catholic theological training in the Russian Empire was at the Saint Petersburg Roman Catholic Theological Academy.

=== Kozłowska's revelations ===
In 1893 Kozłowska had her first religious vision. In it she understood she was to found a new religious movement expressing "Mariavitism". Further visions continued until 1918. Their content was gathered in a volume entitled Dzieło Wielkiego Miłosierdzia (The Work of Great Mercy), published by the Marinate Press in 1922.

=== Excommunication ===
Observing the spread of "Mariavitism" across their ecclesiastical territory, Polish Catholic bishops were alarmed by the threat the movement posed to their apostolic authority and teachings and reported it to the Vatican probably in the late 1890s. After the election of a new pope, a final papal decision on the fate of the movement was made in September 1904. In April 1906, Pope Pius X promulgated the encyclical Tribus circiter. In December 1906, the Catholic Church excommunicated Kozłowska, Kowalski and their followers.

=== Mariavite Church, 1906–1921 ===
From 1906 the newly independent denomination continued its development, in no small measure due to donations and support from the faithful. Kozlowska's own acquisition of 400 hectares of land in Płock, enabled not only the construction of a cathedral, completed "in-house" by two professionally qualified architects and engineers (Maria Mateusz Szymanowski and Maria Bartłomiej Przysiecki) who brought into the church considerable personal 'dowries' for the construction in Płock, of the Sanctuary of Mercy and Charity(1914) with adjoining monastic buildings, but the development of revenue raising enterprises, such as educational facilities, a printing press, bakery and animal breeding.

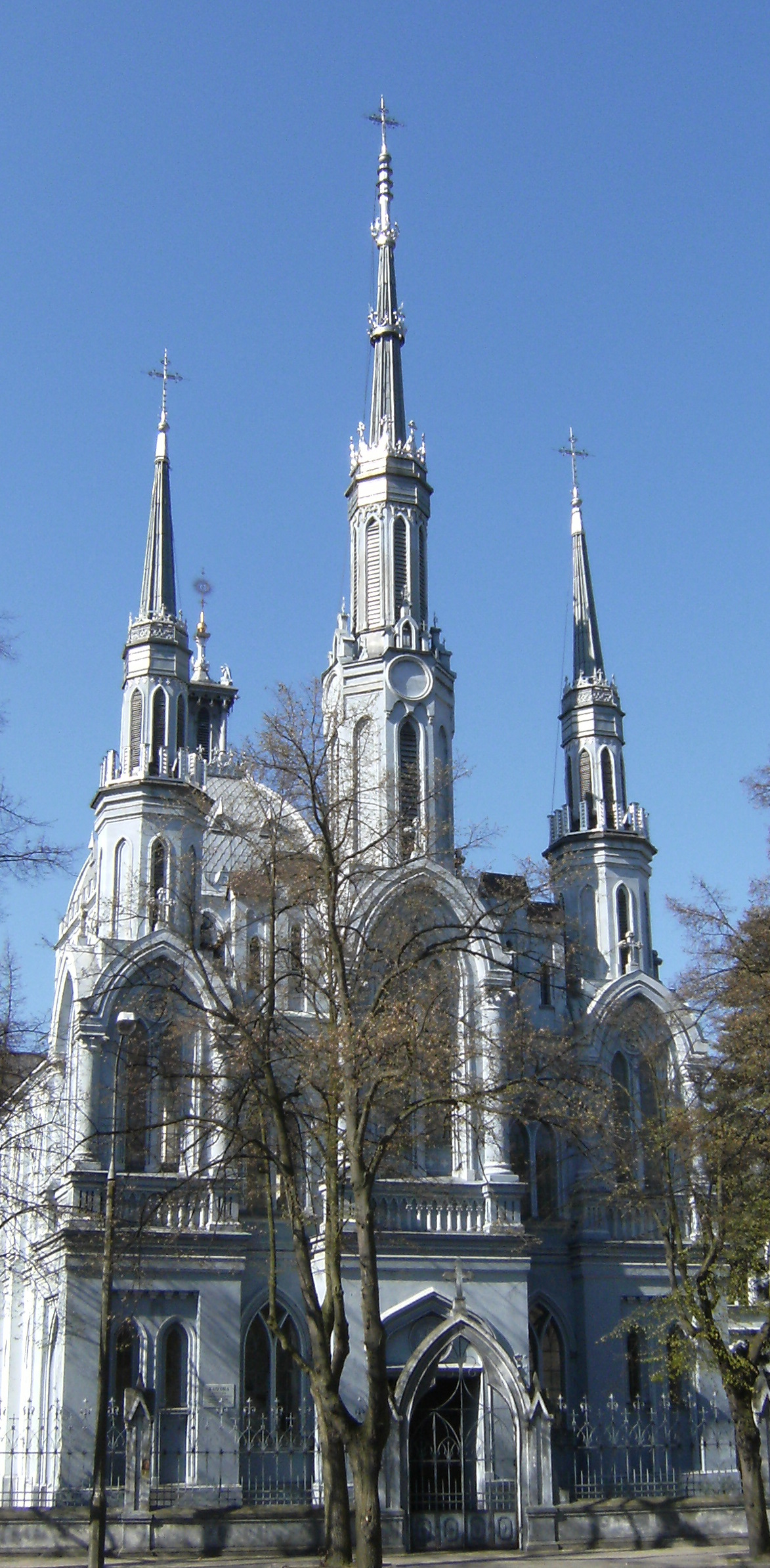
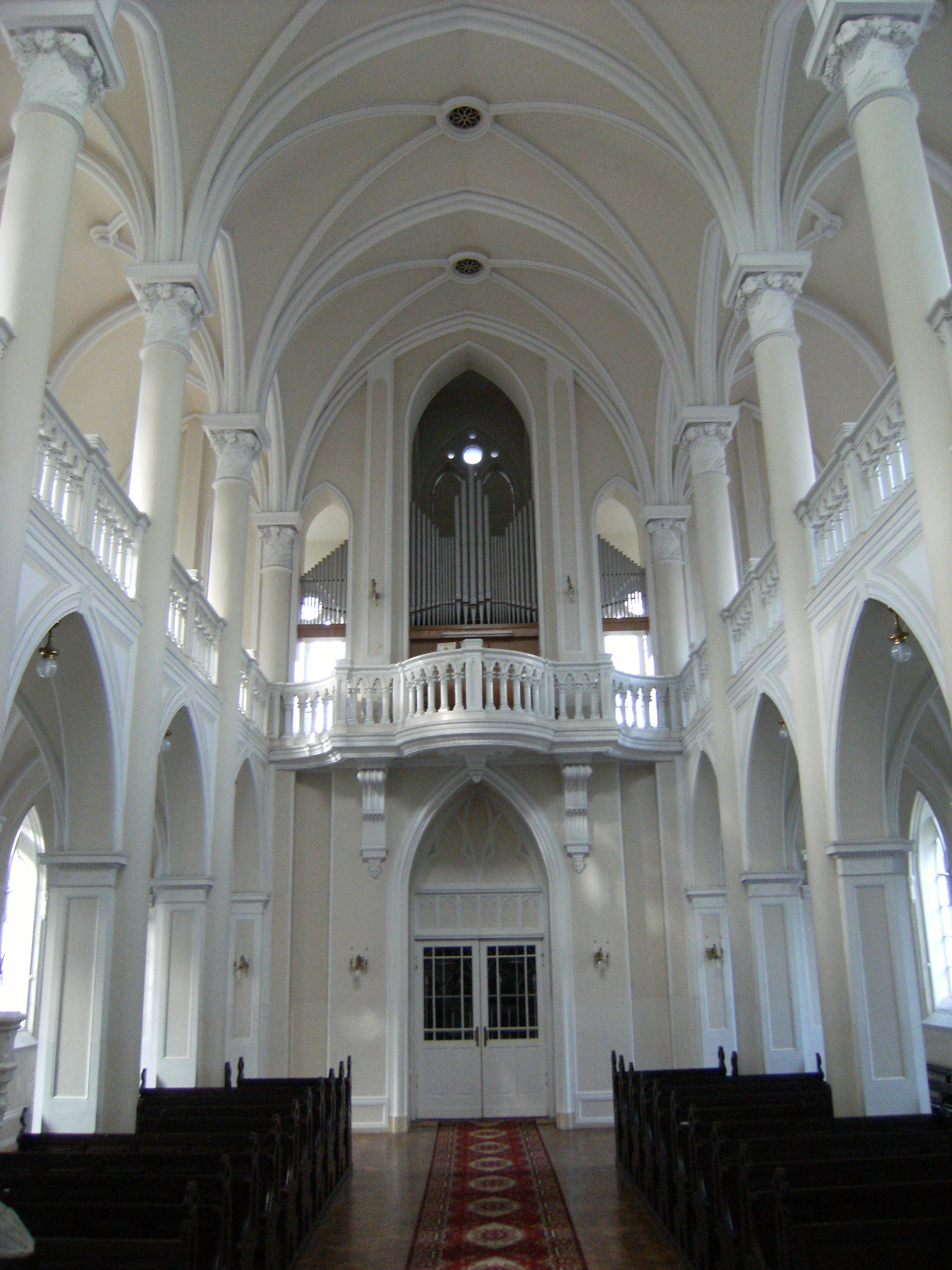
Temple of Mercy and Charity (1914) in Płock, Poland, headquarters of the Old Catholic Mariavite Church. The complex in English Gothic was designed by Feliks Maria Mateusz Szymanowski and Maria Bartłomiej Przysiecki, later priests of the church, with Michał Kowalski as client

=== Apostolic succession ===
Kowalski was consecrated in St. Gertrude's Cathedral, Utrecht, on 5 October 1909, by Old Catholic Church of the Netherlands (OKKN) Archbishop Gerardus Gul of Utrecht, assisted by two OKKN bishops, J. J. van Thiel of Haarlem and N. B. P. Spit of Deventer, one Catholic Diocese of the Old Catholics in Germany bishop, J. Demmel of Bonn, and Arnold Harris Mathew of London.

In turn, Kowalski went on to consecrate Fatôme (France), Feldman, Gołębiowski, Próchniewiski, Rostoworowski, Siedlecki, and his own wife, Maria Izabela Wiłucka-Kowalska.

==== Kowalski reforms (1921–1935) ====
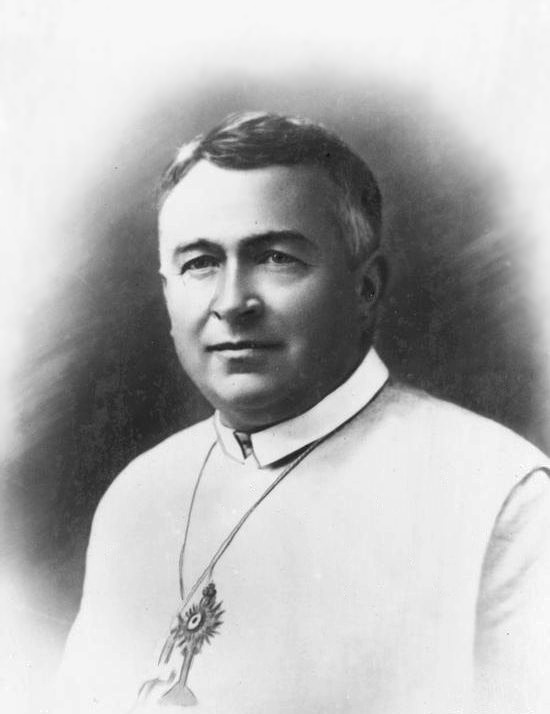
Jan Michał Kowalski (1871-1942)

Following the death in 1921 of the foundress of the movement, Kozlowska, there was no effective inhibition on Kowalski's reforms and innovations which included:

- 1922–1924 - Marriage available for priests
- 1922: Communion under the two species
- 1929: the Ordination of women, introduced in the Catholic Mariavite Church (with possibility of marriage)
- 1929–1935: ordination of women, abolished in Old Catholic Mariavite Church (one reason for the schism in the church)
- 1930: Priesthood of the people of God similar to Protestant concept
- 1930: Eucharist for new-born baptized infants
- 1930: Removal of ecclesiastical titles
- 1930: Suppression of prerogatives of the clergy
- 1931–1933: Simplification of liturgical ceremonies
- 1931–1933: Simplification of the Lenten sacrifice
- ?: Reduction of the Eucharistic fast

Kowalski's innovations disrupted and severed the connection with the Old Catholics in Europe. The church struggled to maintain its reputation and standing during the Second Polish Republic in newly independent and sovereign Poland. Mariavites were actively discriminated against to the extent of "Mariavite pogroms". The leaders of the Mariavite Church were persecuted and sued in court. Kowalski himself appeared in 20 cases to answer charges. Among other allegations he was accused of blasphemies.

== Church schism ==
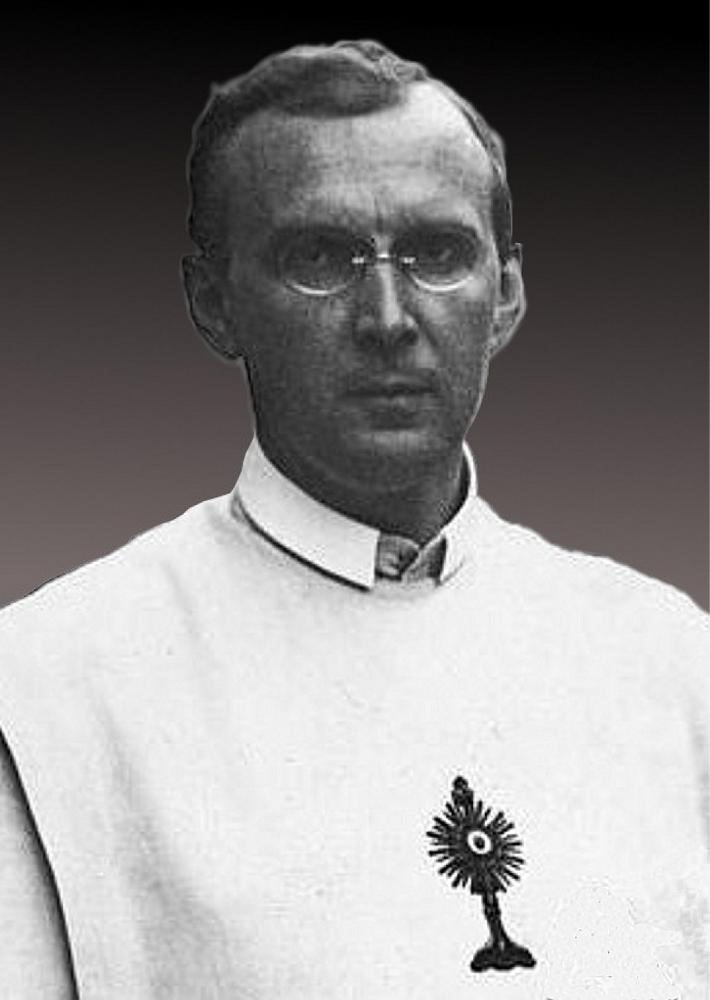
Bishop Maria Filip Feldman (1885-1971)

Throughout its early tribulations with the Rome authorities, the church was led by Kozłowska's lieutenant, the catholic priest, later excommunicated, Michał Kowalski until 1935. Kowalski had become a bishop and archbishop in the meanwhile, headquartered in the city of Płock, among other Mariavite diocesan bishops. His theological, doctrinal and ecclesiastical interpretations and innovations put pressure on the Mariavite episcopate. Among these were the introduction of married clergy, the subsequent birth of 'mystical children' separated from their parents for early rearing, the ordination of women, the establishment of a "priesthood of the faithful" and not least, Kowalski's own sexually predatory and abusive behaviour towards young nuns. The sexual allegations became the subject of a court case and public scandal surrounding the church and its reputation. Kowalski's brother bishops decided to put a stop to Kowalski's term of office and a schism ensued. The church split in two, so that the "Kowalski parishes", in the minority, became the "Catholic Mariavite Church". Its headquarters was moved to the small estate of Felicjanów, named in honour of the foundress. The dissident majority became known as the "Old Catholic Church of the Mariavites", which, after 1935, was led by bishop Maria Filip Feldman and remained based in the city of Płock. To this day, by reason of the number of worshippers and parishes, they are the larger of the two churches. After 1935, the leadership of the smaller church grouping, the Catholic Mariavite Church, remained loyal to bishop Kowalski, and after his death in a Nazi concentration camp to his widow, bishop Maria Izabela Wiłucka-Kowalska.

The Old Catholic Mariavite Church remains a member of the Polish Ecumenical Council, and also of the World Council of Churches. It is not currently a member of the Old Catholic Union of Utrecht. Since 2023, Maria Jan Opala is the primate bishop of the Old Catholic Mariavite Church. By contrast, the Catholic Mariavite Church currently stands away from the ecumenical movement.

=== Polish name changes ===
The original name of the church was in English translation, the "Old Catholic Mariavite Church" (Polish: Staro-Katolicki Kościół Mariawitów) between 1910 and 1967, when it became Kościół Starokatolicki Mariawitów a grammatical change which does not affect the translation into English.

=== After the 1935 schism ===
The Kowalski loyalists moved from Płock to Felicjanów. The village is the headquarters of the Catholic Church of the Mariavites, which has about 3,000 members. The denomination confirmed all the decisions of Kowalski and introduced a public cult of Kozłowska, the Mateczka, the Spouse of Christ and new Redemptrix of the world. The church is insular and does not participate in the ecumenical movement. Kowalski died in Dachau concentration camp during World War II. His successor was his wife, Bishop Maria Izabela Wiłucka-Kowalska. From 1946 to 2005, the head of the church was Bishop Maria Rafael Wojciechowski. He was succeeded in 2005 by Bishop Maria Beatrycze Szulgowicz.

Feldman led the opposition to Kowalski and attracted the majority of Mariavite adherents. They decided to reverse most of the innovations introduced by Kowalski. They returned to Kozłowska's ideas and rules. The Old Catholic Mariavite Church is much the larger: as of 2011 it had about 23,500 members in Poland.

== Structure of the Mariavite church ==
=== Old Catholic Mariavite Church ===
Leaders:

- 1906–1935: Jan Maria Michał Kowalski
- 1935 Schism
- 1935–1945: Maria Filip Feldman
- 1945–1953: Roman Maria Jakub Próchniewski
- 1953–1955: Wacław Maria Bartłomiej Przysiecki
- 1955–1965: Jan Maria Michał Sitek
- 1965–1972: Wacław Maria Innocenty Gołębiowski
- 1972–1997: Stanisław Maria Tymoteusz Kowalski
- 1997–2007: Zdzisław Maria Włodzimierz Jaworski
- 2007–2015: Michał Maria Ludwik Jabłoński
- 2015–2023: Marek Maria Karol Babi who was removed from office and demoted from episcopal status, effective 15-10-2023, by the Church's Main Chapter following serious maladministration and financial irregularities.
- from 2023: Jarosław Maria Jan Opala

Administration:

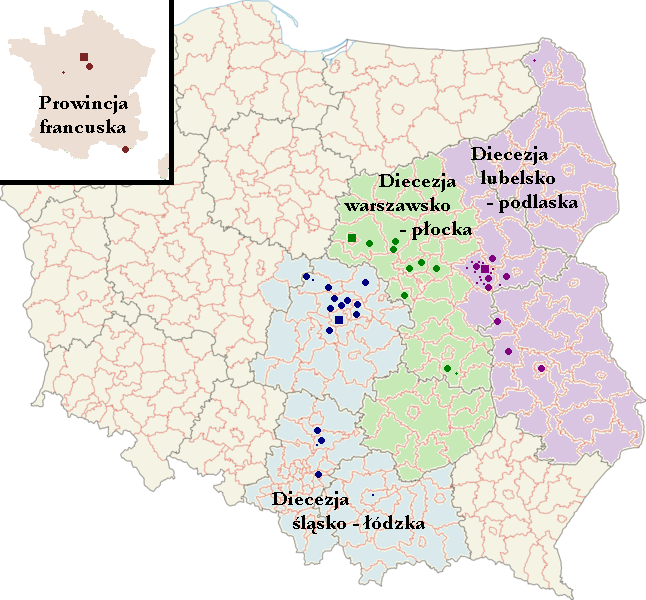
Dioceses of the Old Catholic Mariavite Church in Poland

organized into three dioceses in Poland with 38 parishes and one province in France with 2 parishes:

- Diocese of Warsaw-Płock with cathedral in Płock
- Diocese of Podlasie-Lublin with cathedral in Cegłów
- Diocese of Silesia-Łódź with cathedral in Łódź
- Province of France (French: Province de France de l'Eglise Vieille-Catholique Mariavite) with cathedral in Paris

=== Order of Mariavites in Germany ===
The Order of the Mariavites in Germany (German: Orden der Mariaviten in Deutschland e.V.) is an Eingetragener Verein type association in Germany. Even in 1949, this association was not legally recognized as a cult (or "Sekt" in German) by Germany.

Apostolic succession:

- Kowalski consecrated Marie Marc Fatôme on 4 September 1938 in Felicjanow, Poland
- Fatôme consecrated Marie Paulus Maas on 9 October 1949 in Mannheim, Germany (Note: According to Der Spiegel in 1949, Maas had impersonated a Catholic priest and occasionally flouted: "It is after all a swindle." Although Maas was investigated by Mannheim police, the prosecutor did not issue an arrest warrant until the Roman Catholic Archdiocese of Freiburg pointed out that Maas violated the 1933 Reichskonkordat by wearing Catholic clerical clothing in public. According to Der Spiegel, Maas wanted to become a priest without a theological education, so he forged his Mittlere Reife, Abitur, and certification as a Roman Catholic theologian; he also used two honorary doctorates that he was not entitled to use in Germany.)
- Maas consecrated Maria Norbert Szuwart on 31 October 1987 in Cologne, Germany
