= Felicjanów, Płock County =

Felicjanów
- Village
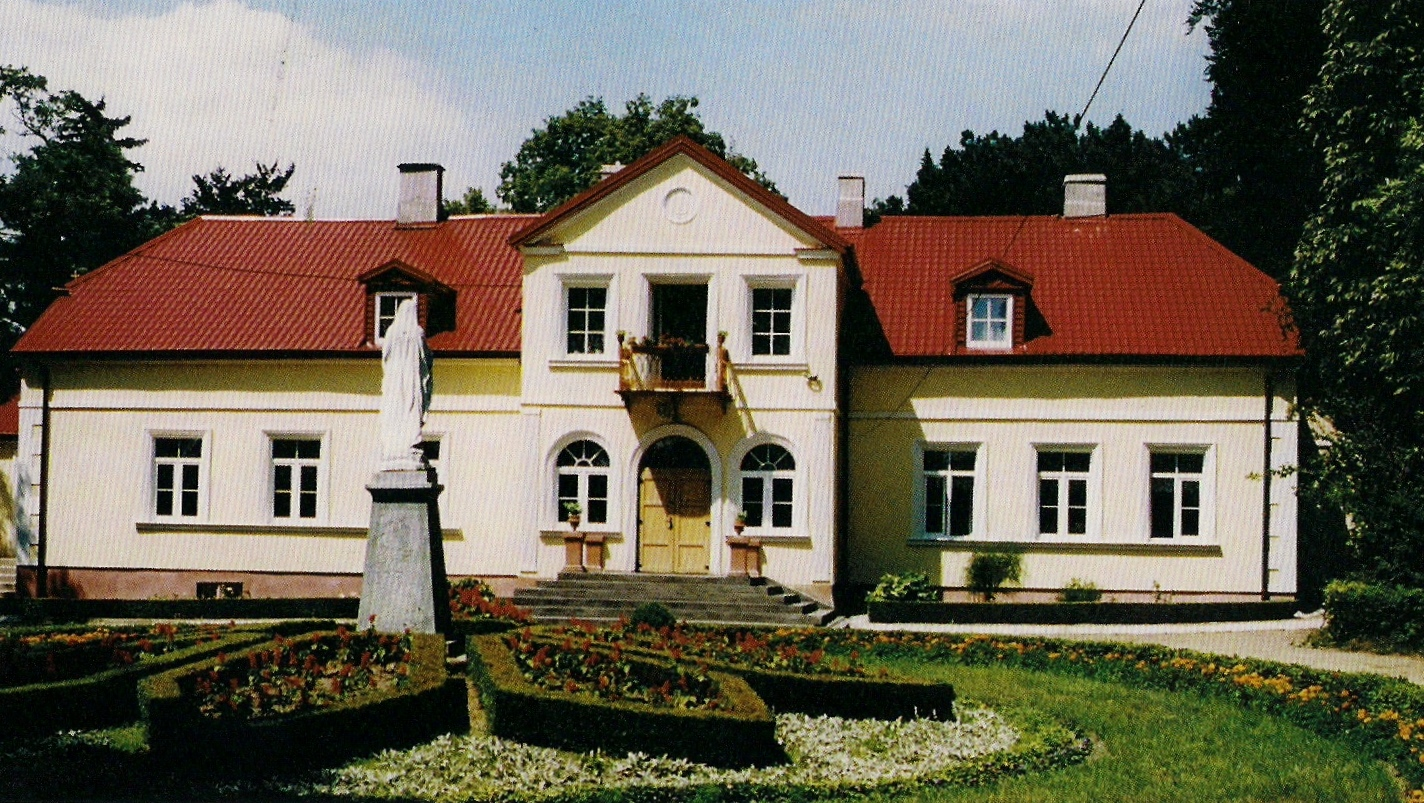
- Catholic Mariavite Monastery in Felicjanów

- Location within Poland
- Coordinates: 52°30′47″N 19°58′31″E
- Country: Poland
- Voivodeship: Masovian
- County: Płock
- Gmina: Bodzanów

Felicjanów [fɛlit͡sˈjanuf] is a village in the administrative district of Gmina Bodzanów, within Płock County, Masovian Voivodeship, in east-central Poland. Founded as a Mariavite colony, it currently serves as headquarters of Catholic Mariavite Church.
