= Canonical inquisition =

A canonical inquisition is an official enquiry in the Roman Catholic Church conducted according to canon law.
