= Kozlovsky, Talovsky District, Voronezh Oblast =

Kozlovsky Козловский
- Settlement
- Location within Voronezh Oblast Location within Russia
- Coordinates: 51°07′N 40°57′E
- Country: Russia
- Region: Voronezh Oblast
- District: Talovsky District
- Time zone: UTC+3:00

Kozlovsky (Russian: Козловский) is a rural locality (a settlement) and the administrative center of Dobrinskoye Rural Settlement, Talovsky District, Voronezh Oblast, Russia. The population was 318 as of 2010. There are 3 streets.
