= Honorat Koźmiński =

Polish Capuchin friar

Blessed Honorat of Biała OFMCap
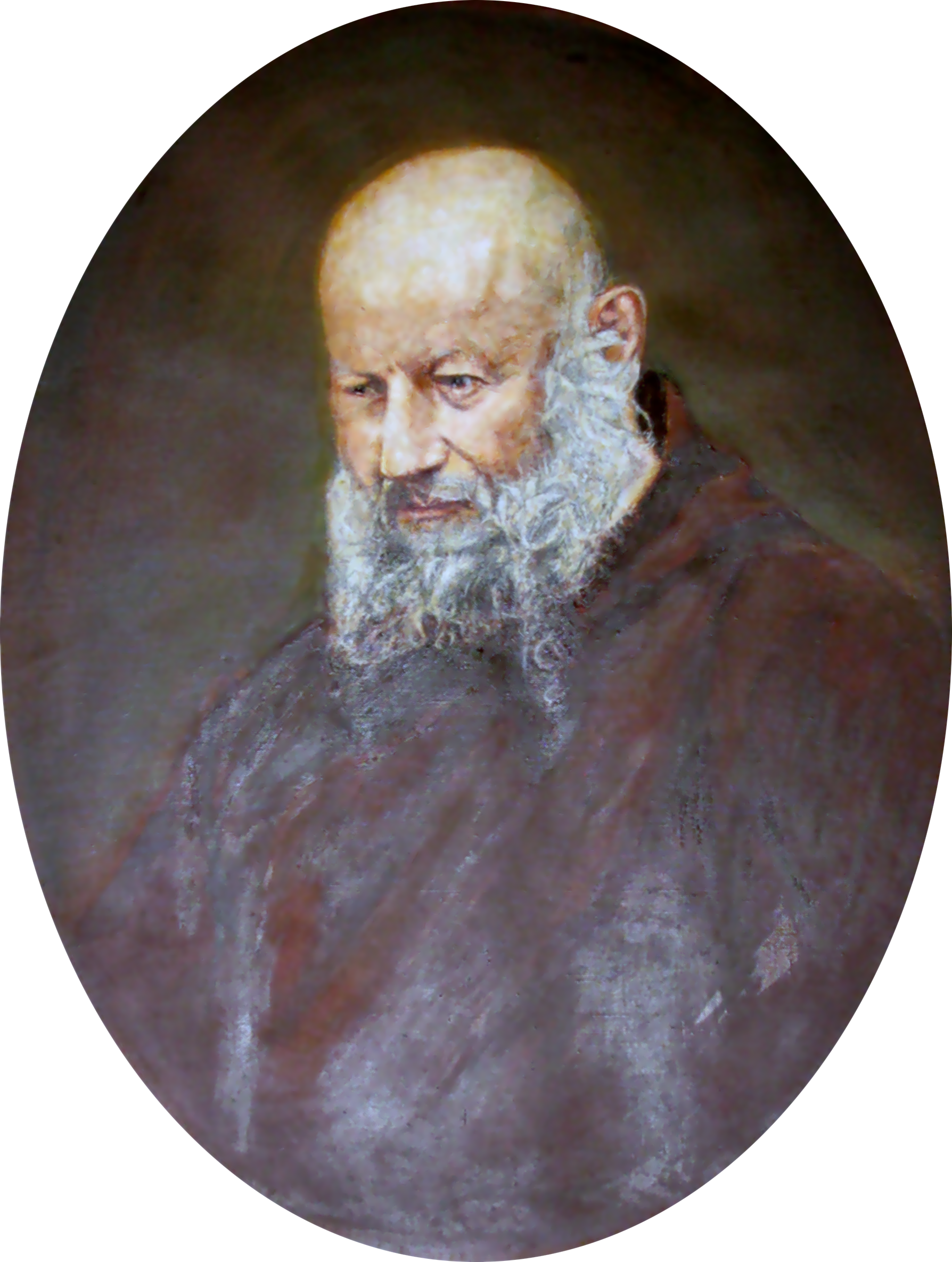
- Born: Florentyn Wacław Jan Stefan Koźmiński; 16 October 1829; Biała Podlaska, Congress Poland
- Died: 16 December 1916 (aged 87); Nowe Miasto nad Pilicą, Mazowieckie, Vistula Land
- Venerated in: Roman Catholic Church
- Beatified: 16 October 1988, Saint Peter's Square, Vatican City by Pope John Paul II
- Feast: 13 October
- Attributes: Franciscan habit

Honorat Koźmiński (16 October 1829 – 16 December 1916), born Florentyn Wacław Jan Stefan Koźmiński, was a Polish priest and professed member from the Order of Friars Minor Capuchin who went on to establish sixteen religious congregations. He was a teacher before reinvigorating clandestine religious orders that the Russian Empire had suppressed during their occupation of Poland. He collaborated with a number of individuals in this venture and publicised the Third Order of Saint Francis to people.

His beatification, by Pope John Paul II, took place on 16 October 1988 in Saint Peter's Square, Rome.

== Life ==
Honorat Koźmiński was born on 16 October 1829 in Biała Podlaska, the second son of Stefan Koźmiński and Aleksandra née Kahl. He was christened Florentyn Wacław Jan Stefan Koźmiński.

He suffered a religious crisis at age eleven and it did not reignite within him until 15 August 1846 during his later imprisonment. He attended school in Płock and from 1844 studied architecture in Warsaw at the Fine Arts School. His father died in 1845. On 23 April 1846 Russian troops arrested him and accused him of being a member of a secret patriotic organisation. It was while imprisoned in the Warsaw Citadel that his religious vocation matured. He contracted typhus while incarcerated which forced his release from prison on 27 February 1847. On 21 December 1848 he entered the Order of Friars Minor Capuchin at their Lubartów monastery and started his novitiate. He made his first profession of vows on 21 December 1849 before going on a philosophical course in Lublin in 1849. He made his solemn profession of vows on 18 December 1850 and was then sent in 1851 to Warsaw on a theological course until 1852. Koźmiński was ordained priest by archbishop Antoni Fijalkowski in Warsaw on 27 December 1852.

His first job after ordination was as a lecturer in Warsaw from 1853 to 1855 before helping to found the Felician Sisters. Even in the hostile climate created by the Russian occupants against the Latin Church Koźmiński carried out his apostolate in secret. He was moved to two different cities after the Russians decreed the abolition of religious orders in 1863. He mentored numerous clandestine religious communities. From 1892 he was stationed in Nowe Miasto nad Pilicą where he became a popular and sought-after confessor and spiritual director. He became a vocal advocate for the Third Order of Saint Francis.

In 1905 he suffered ill health that prompted him to step back temporarily from his apostolate. Koźmiński died on 16 December 1916 after a painful illness. His collected writings include 42 volumes of sermons and 21 volumes of letters.

== Religious orders ==
Kozminski founded or co-founded a total of sixteen different religious congregations. Those orders are:

- Secular Institute of the Handmaids of the Sacred Heart of Jesus
- Handmaids of the Sacred Heart of Jesus of Lithuania
- Daughters of the Sorrowful Mother of God (1881)
- Franciscan Sisters of the Suffering (1882)
- Sisters Servants of Mary Immaculate (1883)
- Vestiarki Sisters of Jesus
- Sisters Servants of Jesus (1884)
- Daughters of the Most Pure Heart of Mary (1885)
- Sisters of the Sacred Name of Jesus (1887)
- Little Sisters of the Immaculate Heart of Mary (1888)
- Reparatrix Sisters of the Holy Face (1888)
- Auxiliary Sisters of the Atoning Souls (1889)
- Daughters of Mary Immaculate (1891)
- Sons of Our Lady of Sorrows
- Sisters Consolers of the Sacred Heart of Jesus (1894)
- Sisters Servants of the Mother of the Good Shepherd (1895)

Other orders that he either founded or co-founded were later disbanded:

- Servants of the Paralytics
- Adorers for Supplication
- Evangelical Ladies
- Housekeepers of the Holy Family
- Daughters of the Mother of God
- Marian Society of Priests
- Congregation of Saint Martha
- Valetudinarian Sisters

== Beatification ==
The beatification cause for the late friar was conducted in the Warsaw archdiocese from 7 April 1949 until 12 January 1951 at which point the investigation turned to his writings. His writings received theological approval on 5 April 1974 before the formal introduction to his cause came on 7 February 1983. The Congregation for the Causes of Saints validated the informative process on 1 February 1985 before receiving the Positio dossier from the postulation in 1986; that September theologians approved. The C.C.S. members approved the cause also on 3 February 1987. One month later on 16 March he was named as Venerable after Pope John Paul II confirmed his heroic virtue.

The miracle leading to his beatification was investigated in Poland in an investigation that moved to Rome; the C.C.S. validated this process twice on 1 February 1985 and on 30 April 1987 before a medical board approved the miraculous nature of the healing on 14 October 1987. Theologians also confirmed this miracle on 4 March 1988 as did the C.C.S. two months later on 17 May. John Paul II confirmed this miracle on 1 September and beatified Koźmínski on 16 October in Saint Peter's Square.

The current postulator for this cause is the Capuchin friar Carlo Calloni.

== Bibliographical resources ==
- Luciana Mirri, ed. (2003). Il beato Onorato Koźmiński. Uomo di sapienza e santità. Atti del convegno, Lublino 23-24 ottobre 1998. Rome: Istituto Storico dei Cappuccini. ISBN 88-88001-16-6.
