= Harald Rein =

Swiss Old Catholic prelate

- Bishop Emeritus of the Christian Catholic Church of Switzerland
- Church: Christian Catholic Church of Switzerland
- Predecessor: Fritz-René Müller
- Previous post: Bishop Delegate for the Old Catholic Church of the Union of Utrecht in Italy

Orders
- Ordination: 1982
- Consecration: September 12, 2009 by Joris Vercammen of the Old Catholic Church of the Netherlands

Personal details
- Born: October 1, 1957 (age 68)
- Profession: theologian
- Motto: "Not with praises nor with threats"
- Coat of arms

Harald Rein (born October 1, 1957, in Bochum) is a Swiss theologian and served as the seventh bishop of the Christian Catholic Church of Switzerland.

== Life ==
Harald Rein is a native German who obtained Swiss citizenship in 2001. His father was a mechanical engineer, and he himself studied, among other places, in Bern. Since 1982, he has been active in the Christian Catholic Church of Switzerland, initially as a vicar in Möhlin, from 1983 to 1993 as a pastor in Obermumpf-Wallbach, and since 1993 in the parish of Zurich. Since 2001, he served as the episcopal vicar of Bishop Fritz-René Müller, and after his resignation on March 1, 2009, he became the diocesan administrator. In 2001, he acquired Swiss citizenship and was a candidate for the episcopal seat but was not elected. He was then appointed as the episcopal vicar by the newly elected bishop, Fritz-René Müller, and after Müller's resignation on March 1, 2009, he became the apostolic administrator. On the occasion of the 141st Session of the National Synod of the Christian Catholic Church of Switzerland on June 12, 2009, in Olten, he was elected as the seventh bishop of his Church, reaching the necessary two-thirds majority on the second ballot with 87 votes out of 120 valid votes. The episcopal consecration took place on September 12, 2009, at the Augustinerkirche in Zurich. Archbishop Joris Vercammen was the main consecrator. As a motto, Rein chose "Not human praise, not human fear" [shall move us].

Harald Rein earned a Doctor of Theology degree from the University of Lucerne with a pastoral-theological thesis on highway churches. In his further scientific work, he focused on the topic of church community management (Oikodomik). He completed postgraduate studies in management and public administration and held several lectureships in church management at the Department of Christian Catholic Theology at the University of Bern. Within the ecumenical movement, Harald Rein has, among other roles, been the President of the Working Group of Christian Churches in the Canton of Zurich and a Delegate of the Christian Catholic Church of Switzerland to the ninth plenary session of the World Council of Churches in 2006 in Porto Alegre. He also published a study on ecumenical relations between the Anglican, Old Catholic, and Orthodox Churches. On June 16, 2009, the University of Bern appointed him as a privatdozent for practical theology with the restrictive specification of theological cybernetics, based on a series of individual publications considered equivalent to habilitation. On April 3, 2011, he took on the role of Delegate of the International Old Catholic Bishops' Conference for the Old Catholic Church of the Union of Utrecht in Italy, a position he held until July 1 of the same year.

As goals for his term as bishop, he mentioned the growth of the Christian Catholic Church of Switzerland, which should not be achieved through proselytism but by addressing more church-distant people searching for a spiritual home. Additionally, he emphasized the ecumenical role of the Christian Catholic Church, particularly the reception of the dialogue document "Church and Ecclesial Communion," which the International Roman Catholic-Old Catholic Dialogue Commission presented in 2009.

Since October 21, 2015, Harald Rein has been an honorary assistant bishop of the Anglican Diocese in Europe.

Bishop Harald Rein resigned as bishop on October 29, 2023. The election of the new bishop will happen at the 157th session of the National Synod from May 24th–25th, 2024 in Aarau.

== Episcopal genealogy ==
Rein's episcopal genealogy is:

Roman Catholic Church

- Cardinal Scipione Rebiba
- Cardinal Giulio Antonio Santori
- Cardinal Girolamo Bernerio, O.P.
- Archbishop Galeazzo Sanvitale
- Cardinal Ludovico Ludovisi
- Cardinal Luigi Caetani
- Bishop Giovanni Battista Scanaroli
- Cardinal Antonio Barberini junior
- Archbishop Charles-Maurice Le Tellier
- Bishop Jacques Bénigne Bossuet
- Bishop Jacques de Goyon de Matignon
- Bishop Dominique Marie Varlet

Old Catholic Church of the Netherlands

- Archbishop Petrus Johannes Meindaerts
- Bishop Johannes van Stiphout
- Archbishop Walter van Nieuwenhuisen
- Bishop Adrian Jan Broekman
- Archbishop Johannes Jacobus van Rhijn
- Bishop Gisbert van Jong
- Archbishop Willibrord van Os
- Bishop Jan Bon
- Archbishop Johannes van Santen
- Bishop Jan Lambert Wirix-Speetjens
- Archbishop Joris Vercammen

Christian Catholic Church of Switzerland

- Bishop Harald Rein

== Works ==
- Limits of Pastoral Care: The Tension between Territorial Parish Competence and Functional Pastoral Ministry Using the Example of Highway Churches in Germany. Peter Lang, Bern, 1987, ISBN 3-261-03779-2
- Church Community: Anglican-Old Catholic-Orthodox Relations from 1870 to 1990 and Their Ecumenical Relevance. 2 volumes (European University Publications. Series 23, Theology), Peter Lang, Bern, 1993–1994. ISBN 3-906750-72-8 (Vol. 1), ISBN 3-906752-32-1 (Vol. 2)

Titles
Preceded by	Episcopal Vicar; 2001 - March 1, 2009	Succeeded by
Preceded by Fritz-René Müller (as Bishop)	Diocesan Administrator (Christian Catholic Church); March 1, 2009 - June 12, 2009	Succeeded by himself (as Bishop)
Preceded by Fritz-René Müller	Bishop of Bern (Christian Catholic Church); June 12, 2009 - October 29, 2023	Succeeded by TBD
Preceded by Fritz-René Müller	Delegate of the International Episcopal Conference for the Old Catholics of Italy; April 3, 2011 - June 30, 2011	Succeeded by Pierre Whalon (Episcopal Church in the United States of America)
