= Roman Maria Jakub Próchniewski =

Polish Mariavite bishop (1872–1954)

- Bishop of the Mariavite Old Catholic Church
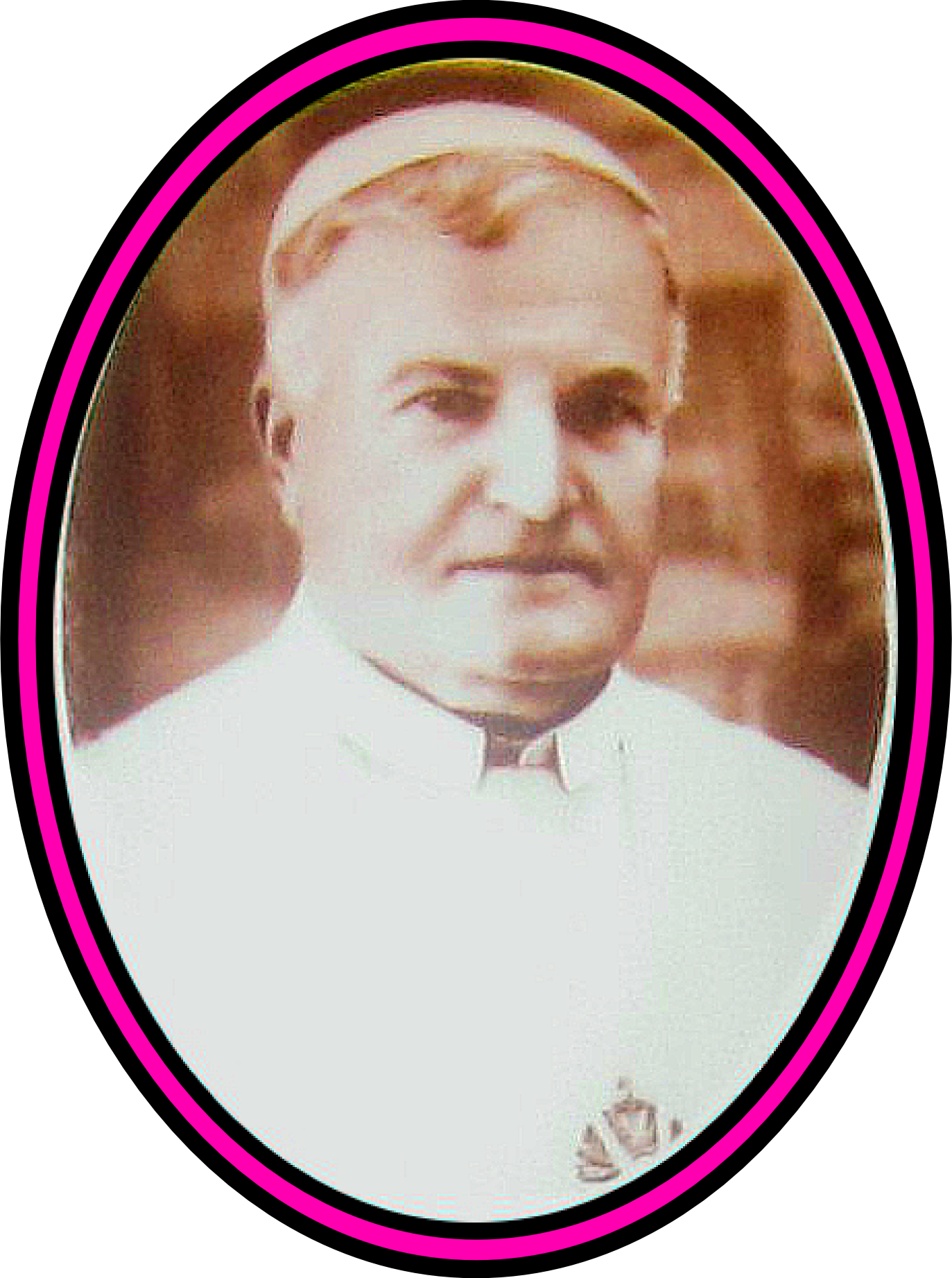
- Church: Mariavite Old Catholic Church
- Installed: 1945
- Term ended: 1953
- Predecessor: Maria Filip Feldman
- Successor: Maria Bartłomiej Przysiecki
- Previous posts: Mariavite provincial leader of the Lublin district (1903); Mariavite parish priest in Płock (1906); Vicar general of the Old Catholic Mariavite Church (1907)

Orders
- Consecration: September 4, 1910

Personal details
- Born: February 29, 1872 Poland
- Died: February 13, 1954 (aged 81) Płock, Poland
- Occupation: Prime Bishop of the Mariavite Old Catholic Church
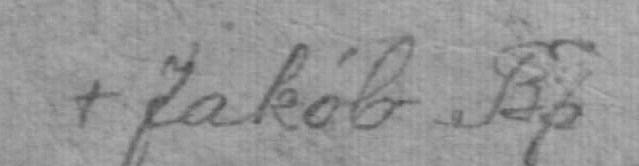
- Signature

- Coat of arms

Ordination history of Roman Maria Jakub Próchniewski
History
Episcopal consecration
- Principal consecrator: Jan Maria Michał Kowalski
- Co-consecrators: Gerardus Gul; Jakub van Thiel
- Place: Łowicz, Poland
Episcopal succession
Bishops consecrated by Roman Maria Jakub Próchniewski as principal consecrator
- Zygmunt Szypold: April 13, 1947

Roman Maria Jakub Próchniewski (February 29, 1872 in Congress Poland - February 13, 1954 in Płock, Poland) was the Prime Bishop of the Mariavite Old Catholic Church from 1945 to 1953.

He graduated from the Saint Petersburg Roman Catholic Theological Academy. He served as a professor at the Theological Seminary in Lublin and, from 1903, as the provincial leader for Mariavites in the Lublin district. In 1906, he became the parish priest of the Mariavite parish in Płock. From the chapter in 1907, he was the vicar general. He was consecrated as a bishop on September 4, 1910, in Łowicz. He was a confessor of Maria Franciszka Kozłowska, the founder of the Mariavite movement, and the author of theological and Mariavite-themed articles. From 1945 to 1953, he served as the Prime Bishop of the Mariavite Old Catholic Church. He wrote a book about Maria Franciszka Kozłowska titled Żywot Przeczystej Pani i objawione jej Dzieło Wielkiego Miłosierdzia (Life of the Pure Lady and her Revealed Work of Great Mercy). He was the main consecrator of Bishop Zygmunt Szypold who became the head of the Polish Old Catholic Church.

== Episcopal genealogy ==
His episcopal genealogy is as follows:

Roman Catholic Church

- Cardinal Scipione Rebiba
- Cardinal Giulio Antonio Santori
- Cardinal Girolamo Bernerio, O.P.
- Archbishop Galeazzo Sanvitale
- Cardinal Ludovico Ludovisi
- Cardinal Luigi Caetani
- Bishop Giovanni Battista Scanaroli
- Cardinal Antonio Barberini
- Archbishop Charles Maurice Le Tellier
- Bishop Jacques Bénigne Bossuet
- Bishop Jacques de Goyon de Matignon
- Bishop Dominique Marie Varlet

Old Catholic Church of the Netherlands

- Archbishop Petrus Johannes Meindaerts
- Bishop Johannes van Stiphout
- Cardinal Walter van Nieuwenhuisen
- Bishop Adrian Jan Broekman
- Archbishop Johannes Jacobus van Rhijn
- Bishop Gisbert Cornelius de Jong
- Archbishop Willibrord van Os
- Bishop Jan Bon
- Archbishop Johannes van Santen

Old Catholic Church

- Bishop Hermann Heykamp
- Bishop nl:Gasparus Johannes van Rinkel
- Archbishop Gerardus Gul

Mariavite Church

- Bishop Jan Maria Michał Kowalski (Note: Co-consecrated with Old Catholic bishops.)
- Bishop Maria Jakub Próchniewski

== Sources ==
- Appolis, Émile (1965). "Une Église des derniers temps: L'Église Mariavite". Archives de sociologie des religions (in French). 19 (19): 51–67. doi:10.3406/assr.1965.2572. ISSN 0003-9659. JSTOR 30120666.
- Bain, Alan (1985). Bishops Irregular: An International Directory of Independent Bishops. Bristol, England: A. M. Bain. ISBN 978-0-9510298-0-0.
- Górecki, Artur: Mariawici i mariawityzm – narodziny i pierwsze lata istnienia. Warszawa: 2011. ISBN 978-83-7181-673-4, ISBN 978-83-7181-711-3.
- Old Catholic Mariavite Church. "Biskupi Mariawiccy" [Mariavite bishops]. mariawita.pl. Płock, PL: Kościół Starokatolicki Mariawitów. Archived from the original on 10 January 2014.
- Peterkiewicz, Jerzy (1975). The third Adam. London: Oxford University Press. ISBN 978-0-19-212198-1.
- Rybak, Stanisław. "Mariawityzm: studium historyczne" (PDF). mariawita-warszawa.com (in Polish). Michał Rybak. Archived from the original (PDF) on 16 March 2007.
