= Cornelius Johannes Barchman Wuytiers =

Dutch Old Catholic Archbishop (died 1733)

- Old Catholic Archbishop of Utrecht
- Church: Old Catholic Church
- Archdiocese: Utrecht
- In office: 1725-1733
- Predecessor: Cornelius van Steenoven
- Successor: Theodorus van der Croon

Orders
- Consecration: 30 September 1725 by Dominique Marie Varlet

Personal details
- Died: 13 May 1733 Rhynwyck, Netherlands
- Denomination: Old Catholic

Cornelius Johannes Barchman Wuytiers (died 13 May 1733 at Rhynwyck, Netherlands) served as the Old Catholic Archbishop of Utrecht from 1725 to 1733.

== Early life and schooling ==
Barchman Wuytiers was born into a noble family. He was educated at the Oratorian schools in Huissen, Louvain and Paris. According to Bellegarde, years before Barchman Wuytiers went to Paris, Pashasius Quesnel had prophesied that Barchman Wuytiers would one day be Archbishop of Utrecht.

== Consecration as Archbishop of Utrecht ==
Upon the death of Archbishop Cornelius van Steenoven on 3 April 1725, Barchmann Wuytiers was unanimously elected by the Chapter of Utrecht on 15 May 1725 to fill the vacant see. As in the case of Barchman Wuytiers' predecessor, the Chapter notified the pope of the election of the archbishop-elect, requesting the pope's confirmation of the election and a dispensation for consecration by a single bishop. On 23 August 1725, Pope Benedict XIII issued a condemnation of the election of Barchman Wuytiers as Archbishop of Utrecht. The papal condemnation was even harsher than that of Barchman Wuytier's predecessor, Steenoven, suggesting that both Archbishop Steenoven and a priest named Theodore Doncker, who was present at Steenoven's consecration, died due to divine vengeance. Doncker, who was actually still alive, would later use the false statement of his death in the condemnation to argue against papal infallibility.

On 30 September 1725, in the Church of St. James and St. Augustine in The Hague, Barchman Wuytiers was consecrated Archbishop of Utrecht by Bishop Dominique Marie Varlet. He received more than 100 letters of congratulation, signed by more than 2,000 ecclesiastics, including all the Roman Catholic bishops who had congratulated his predecessor, Steenoven.

== Excommunication by the Roman Catholic Church ==
Barchman Wuytiers sent word of his consecration to Pope Benedict XIII, who responded by excommunicating Barchman Wuytiers and all who assisted, encouraged and followed him. Barchman Wuytiers replied that he would offer to resign as Archbishop of Utrecht on the condition that Benedict XIII would recognize the rights of the Chapter of Utrecht and not force him and his priests to accept Unigenitus, the papal bull written in 1713 by Pope Clement XI condemning 101 purportedly Jansenist propositions.

== Refuge for the Persecuted ==
Barchman Wuytiers received into his archdiocese clergy and religious who were persecuted in other places for their refusal to accept Unigenitus, including 31 Carthusian monks and 14 Cistercian monks from France. He attempted to form a mission to Indo-China by French missionaries who refused to accept Unigenitus.

== Responsibility for the Diocese of Haarlem ==
The Chapter of Utrecht subsequently inquired of canonists in Louvain whether it had the right, as chapter of the metropolitan see, to appoint a vicar general for Haarlem, if the Chapter of Haarlem refused or delayed in doing so. With the assent of the canonists, the Chapter of Utrecht appointed Barchman Wuytiers as vicar general of the Diocese of Haarlem. He thus governed the parishes of the Diocese of Haarlem, both in his capacity as vicar general of the diocese and as metropolitan.

Barchman Wuytiers was anxious to consecrate a bishop for the Diocese of Haarlem. After consulting Zeger Bernhard van Espen and others, he notified the Chapter at Haarlem that he would exercise his right as metropolitan to name a bishop, if they failed to elect their own candidate within three months. Three months passed, and Barchman Wuytiers assembled his chapter, which unanimously elected Theodore Doncker, who died before he was consecrated bishop of Haarlem.

== Death ==
Archbishop Barchman Wuytiers died suddenly in his home at Rhynwyck, near Utrecht, on 13 May 1733.

Catholic Church titles
Preceded by Cornelius van Steenoven; 1724-1725	Archbishop of Utrecht; 1725-1733	Succeeded by Theodorus van der Croon; 1734-1739
