= Theodorus van der Croon =

Archbishop of Utrecht from 1734 to 1739

- Old Catholic Archbishop of Utrecht
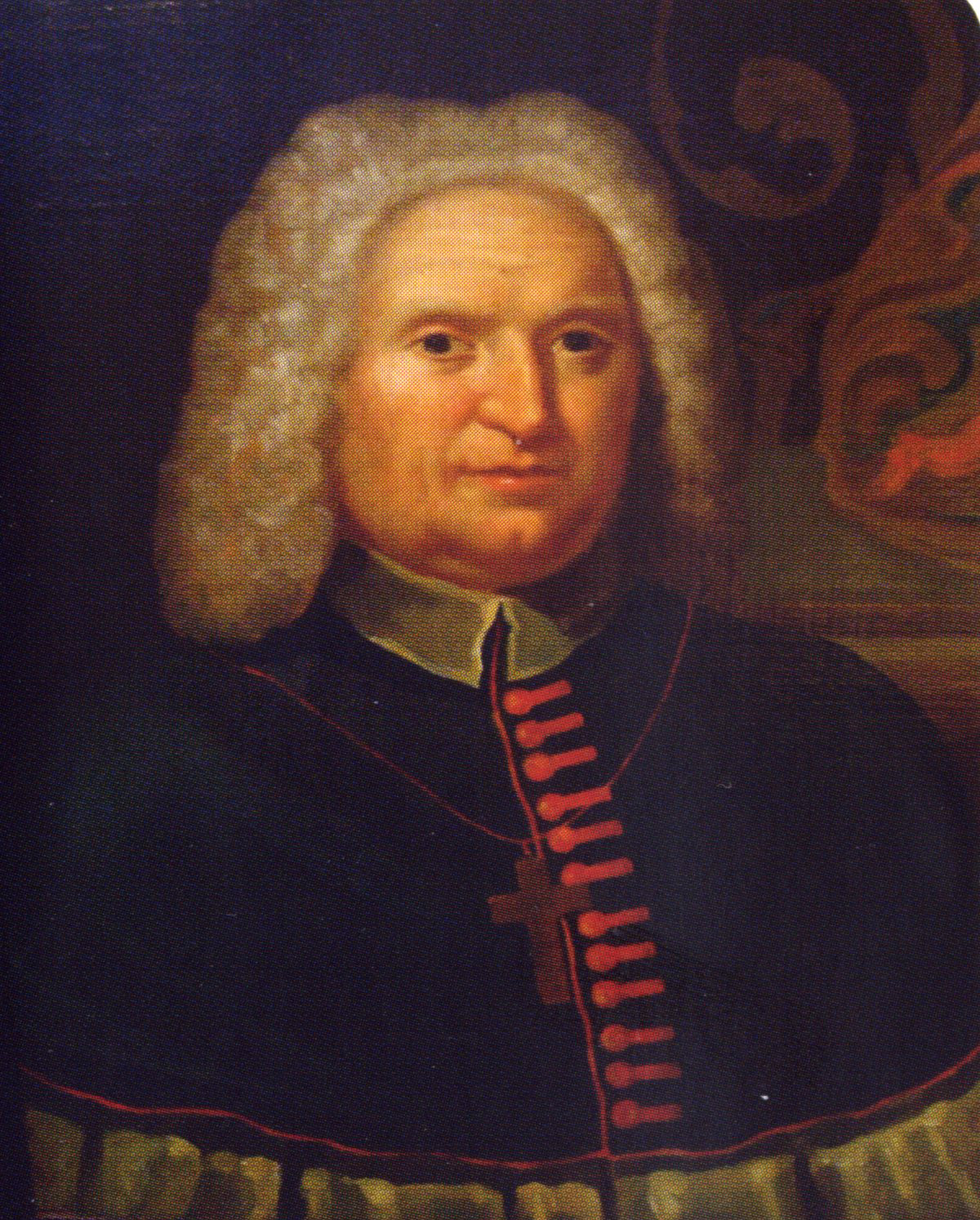
- Church: Old Catholic Church
- Archdiocese: Utrecht
- In office: 1734-1739
- Predecessor: Cornelius Johannes Barchman Wuytiers
- Successor: Petrus Johannes Meindaerts

Orders
- Consecration: 28 October 1734 by Dominique Marie Varlet

Theodorus van der Croon (1668–1739) served as the ninth Archbishop of Utrecht from 1734 to 1739.

== Early Ministry & Association with the Chapter of Utrecht ==
Van der Croon was a parish priest in Gouda, Netherlands and was associated with the Chapter of Utrecht since the days of Archbishop Petrus Codde (1688–1710).

== Archbishop of Utrecht ==
Following the death of Cornelius Johannes Barchman Wuytiers, Archbishop of Utrecht, on 13 May 1733, the Chapter of Utrecht convened on 22 July 1733 and unanimously elected van der Croon as bishop elect. On 28 October 1734 he was consecrated by Bishop Dominique Marie Varlet of the Diocese of Babylon. Church historian C.B. Moss described van der Croon as "a man of particularly gentle disposition."

Van der Croon published a considerable number of works in Dutch and Latin.

Catholic Church titles
Preceded by Cornelius Johannes Barchman Wuytiers; 1725-1733	Old Catholic Archbishop of Utrecht; 1668-1739	Succeeded by Petrus Johannes Meindaerts; 1739-1767
