= Archdiocese of Utrecht =

The archdiocese, archbishopric, diocese or Bishopric of Utrecht may refer to:

- Diocese of Utrecht (695–1580), the historic diocese and after 1559 archdiocese before and during the Protestant Reformation
  - Prince-Bishopric of Utrecht (1024–1528), the temporal jurisdiction of the bishops
- Roman Catholic Archdiocese of Utrecht (1853 – present), the current archdiocese in the Netherlands within the Catholic Church
- Old Catholic Archdiocese of Utrecht (1723 – present), the current archdiocese within the Old Catholic Church of the Netherlands

== See also ==
- List of bishops and archbishops of Utrecht
