= Dominique Marie Varlet =

French bishop (1678–1742)

- Latin Catholic Bishop of Babylon
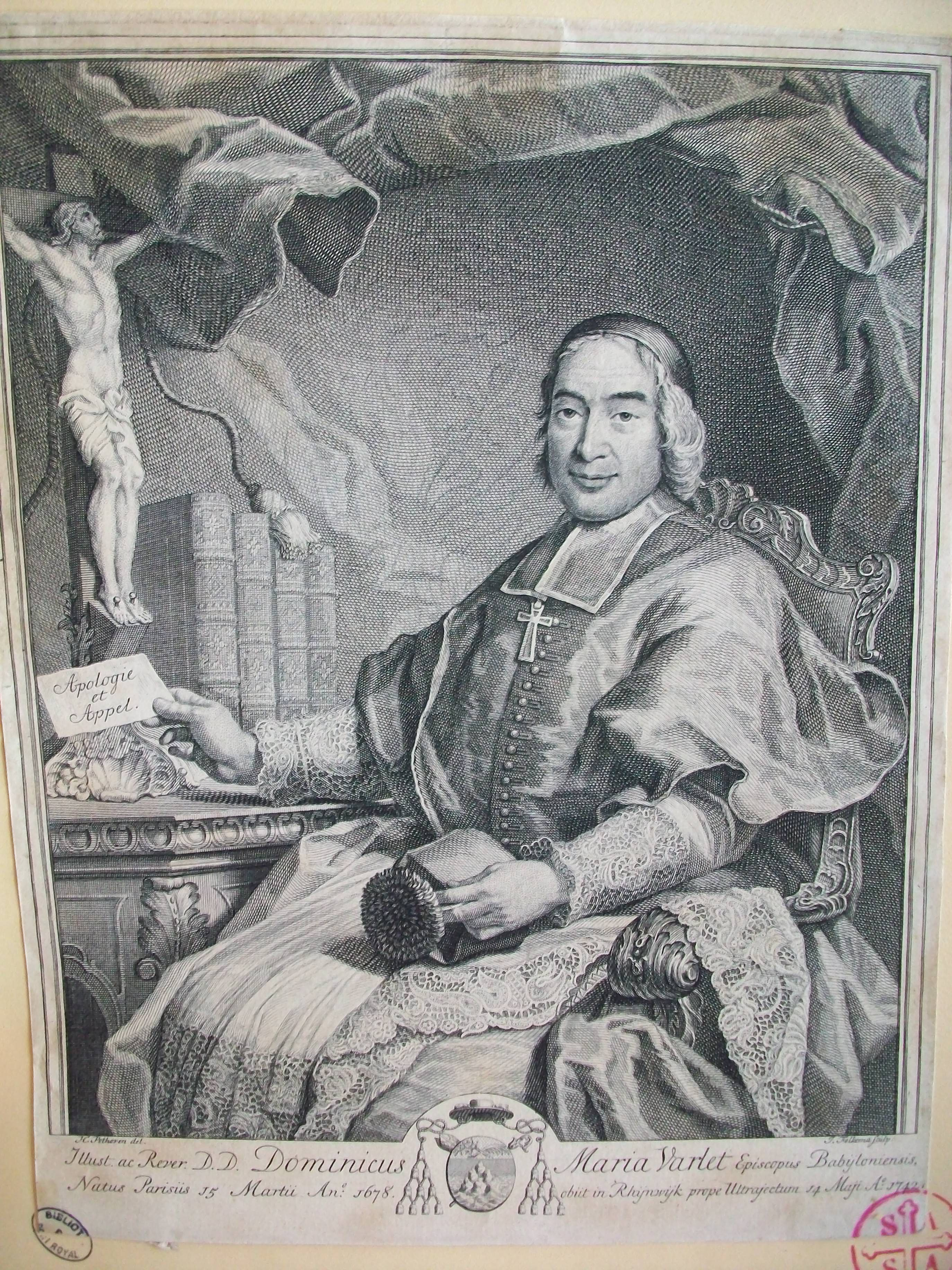
- Church: Catholic Church
- Diocese: Babylon
- In office: 1719–1742
- Predecessor: Pidou Louis-Marie de Saint-Olon

Orders
- Ordination: 1706
- Consecration: February 19, 1719 by Jacques de Goyon Matignon

Personal details
- Born: Paris, France
- Died: Rijswijk, Netherlands
- Denomination: Catholic
- Parents: Achille Varlet, Sieur de Verneuil & Marie Vallée
- Education: Doctor of Theology (Sorbonne, 1706)

Dominique-Marie Varlet (15 March 1678 in Paris – 14 May 1742 in Rijswijk) was a French prelate and missionary of the Catholic Church who served as vicar general of the Diocese of Quebec. Later, as the Latin Catholic Bishop of Babylon, he was involved in a schism within the Catholic Church by consecrating four men successively as Archbishop of Utrecht.

== Early life ==
Varlet was born in Paris on March 15, 1678 to Achille Varlet and Marie Vallée. His father was an actor known by the name Sieur de Verneuil, and his uncle, Charles Varlet de La Grange, was a famous collaborator and friend of Molière. Little is known of his mother, except that she was the daughter of a Parisian hatter, was much younger than her husband, and that she, too, had been involved in theater. Varlet's parents had seven children, of which three survived to adulthood, including Varlet and his younger siblings Jean-Achille (1681-1720) and Marie-Anne.

== Seminary formation and education ==
As a young man, Varlet was enrolled in the Séminaire de Saint-Magloire, an Oratorian school in Paris, where he met two well-known Jansenists with whom he would become fast friends: Jacques Jubé, who would become a renowned liturgist, and Jean Baptiste Paulin d’Aguesseau, the brother of Henri François d’Aguesseau, the chancellor of France. Varlet's family owned a home near Mont Valérien, a famous pilgrimage site, where Varlet came into contact with the Congrégation des prêtres du Calvaire (Congregation of the Priests of Calvary), which he joined in 1699. The strong Jansenist influence of this group would stay with Varlet throughout the remainder of his life.

In 1701, Varlet earned his baccalaureate from the Collège de Navarre, which was part of the University of Paris. He later earned his licentiate, then his doctorate in theology from the Sorbonne in 1706.

== Priestly ministry ==
In 1706, Varlet was ordained a priest and was assigned to serve various parishes in the Paris suburbs, including Conflans-Sainte-Honorine, where he was serving in 1708.

== Missionary priest in North America ==
In 1711, Varlet became part of the missionary society at the Séminaire des Missions Étrangères, the Foreign Missions of Paris, and he resigned as a parish priest in 1712. He was chosen to travel to the French territory of Louisiana and revive the Sainte-Famille mission for the Tamaroa tribe in Cahokia (now East St Louis, Illinois), which had been without a priest since Father Marc Bergier's death in 1707.

In January 1713, Varlet sailed from Port-Louis (in the department of Morbihan) and arrived on June 6 at Mobile Bay, Alabama, where he suffered from dysentery and spent time recovering with fellow religious Albert Davion and François Le Maire. His experience in the New World was not entirely positive, and he wrote that, far from being "one of the marvels of the world," French Louisiana was "wild, uncultivated" country where the missionaries were few and the tribes were rough.

In 1715, Varlet joined an expedition organized by Louisiana governor Antoine de la Mothe Cadillac and finally reached the mission of Sainte-Famille in Cahokia. The same year, he was appointed vicar general for the Mississippi and Illinois region of the Diocese of Quebec. He traveled to Quebec for the first time in 1717, leaving Cahokia on March 24 and arriving in Quebec on September 11. He had hoped to recruit other priests to join him in Cahokia. On May 10, 1718, Goulven Calvarin, Dominique-Antoine-René Thaumur de La Source, and Jean-Paul Mercier departed for Cahokia, but Varlet would never return there.

== Episcopal career ==
After 13 months in Quebec, Varlet received orders dated September 17, 1718 that he had been appointed titular bishop of Ascalon and coadjutor bishop to Louis-Marie Pidou de Saint-Olon, Bishop of the Diocese of Babylon in Persia. On November 13, he departed from La Rochelle, the Canadian port of the Kingdom of France, and arrived in Paris two weeks later. On February 19, 1719, Varlet was consecrated titular bishop of Ascalon in the chapel of the Seminary of the Foreign Missions in Paris by Jacques de Goyon Matignon, bishop emeritus of Condom, assisted by Louis-François Duplessis de Mornay, coadjutor bishop of the Diocese of Quebec, and the bishop of Clermont. On the same day, he received news of Saint-Olon's death, was appointed his successor, and was urged to leave as soon as possible for his see in Persia.

=== Difficulties with the Catholic Church ===
Varlet left Paris on March 18, 1719 without signing his consent to the papal bull Unigenitus Dei Filius, which had previously condemned 101 Jansenist propositions by Pasquier Quesnel. One night, Varlet stopped through Brussels, where he failed to call on the internuncio, as was the custom. Upon arriving in Amsterdam on April 2, Varlet agreed to confirm 604 orphans and other poor people there, since they could not afford to travel to other countries to receive the sacrament and no bishop had celebrated the sacrament there since Archbishop Petrus Codde's death 18 years prior. Varlet then left for his see in Babylon, arriving in Persia on October 9, 1718.

Varlet later moved to Shamaké (now in Azerbaijan). On 26 March 1720, he learned that Rome had suspended him from his episcopal duties on May 7, 1719, following confirmation that he had failed to call upon the papal nuncio at Paris and give his adherence to the papal bull Unigenitus, that he had failed to call upon the internuncio at Brussels, and that he failed to obtain permission to perform episcopal functions in the Netherlands. Varlet insisted that, coming from Canada, he knew nothing of Unigenitus, that he was ordered to travel as privately as possible, and that the Chapter of Utrecht, which had jurisdiction during the vacancy of the see, had invited him to celebrate the sacrament of confirmation there. He also noted that his suspension was highly irregular, since it seemed he was arbitrarily suspended without a trial or opportunity for defense.

Obliged to retrace his steps to Paris to lift the interdict, Varlet returned to Europe, stopping through Amsterdam where he sympathized with the plight of the Dutch Jansenists. After Pope Clement XI, the author of Unigenitus, died in 1721, Varlet returned to Paris, where he stayed with Bishop Charles de Caylus of the Diocese of Auxerre. Varlet obtained an opinion on his case from noted French canonist Jean-Pierre Gibert, who suggested that Varlet's suspension was null and void; several theologians at Paris and Louvain supported this conclusion. In Rome, François de Montigny, procurator of the Société des Missions Étrangères, attempted to regularize Varlet's situation. Varlet returned to the Netherlands, where he began to elaborate a defense of his action and of the nullity of his suspension.

=== Consecration of other bishops ===
In 1723, Varlet became an appellant against the papal bull Unigenitus and allied himself with Dutch clergy who also refused to affirm the bull. Beginning in 1724, Varlet consecrated, against the orders of the Pope, a succession of priests as Archbishop of Utrecht.

In the first instance of this, Pope Innocent XIII and his successor Benedict XIII had refused to confirm the election of canon Cornelius van Steenoven, who was elected archbishop by the Cathedral Chapter of Utrecht but was suspected of Jansenism. The Chapter of Utrecht had obtained an opinion from Zeger Bernhard van Espen and two other doctors at Louvain, noting that they had the right, in special circumstances, to elect their archbishop and have him consecrated without the consent of the Pope, and that, in the case of necessity, one bishop alone might consecrate another. Nineteen doctors of the theological faculties at Paris, Nantes, Rheims and Padua approved of this opinion. Varlet consented to consecrate van Steenoven as seventh Archbishop of Utrecht and did so on October 15, 1724, in the private chapel of the place where Varlet was staying in Amsterdam.

Archbishop Steenoven died in 1725, within six months of his consecration, and the Chapter of Utrecht asked Varlet to consecrate the successor they had elected. On September 30, 1725, in the Church of St. James and St. Augustine in The Hague, Varlet consecrated Cornelius Johannes Barchman Wuytiers as the eighth Archbishop of Utrecht.

Archbishop Barchman Wuytiers died in 1733, and the Chapter of Utrecht again appealed to Varlet to consecrate the successor they had elected. On October 28, 1734, Varlet consecrated Theodorus van der Croon as ninth Archbishop of Utrecht.

Archbishop van der Croon died in 1739, and the Chapter of Utrecht appealed to Varlet again to consecrate the successor they had elected. On October 18, 1739, Varlet consecrated Petrus Johannes Meindaerts as tenth Archbishop of Utrecht. Meindaerts is the last bishop consecrated by Varlet. Meindaerts then consecrated other bishops, such that all later Old Catholic bishops derive their apostolic succession from him.

Varlet was excommunicated as a schismatic, along with the elected archbishops consecrated by him, as well as their followers. This act is often identified by historians as the source of the Old Catholic Church, formulated later in the 19th century. The Dutch diocese, headed by Varlet's ordained bishops, collected many opponents to Unigenitus.

== End of life ==
By the time he consecrated van der Croon in 1739, Varlet was suffering from poor health and had already suffered a stroke. In 1740, he suffered several more strokes, and after a serious stroke on Christmas Day, his "health and mind seemed to be seriously impaired and he entered into a long decline."

Varlet died on May 14, 1742, having consecrated and shared valid lines of apostolic succession with four archbishops of Utrecht, the last of whom would become the source of apostolic succession for all Old Catholic bishops.
