= Bernd Wallet =

Dutch Old Catholic archbishop

The Most Reverend Bernd Wallet
- Old Catholic Archbishop of Utrecht
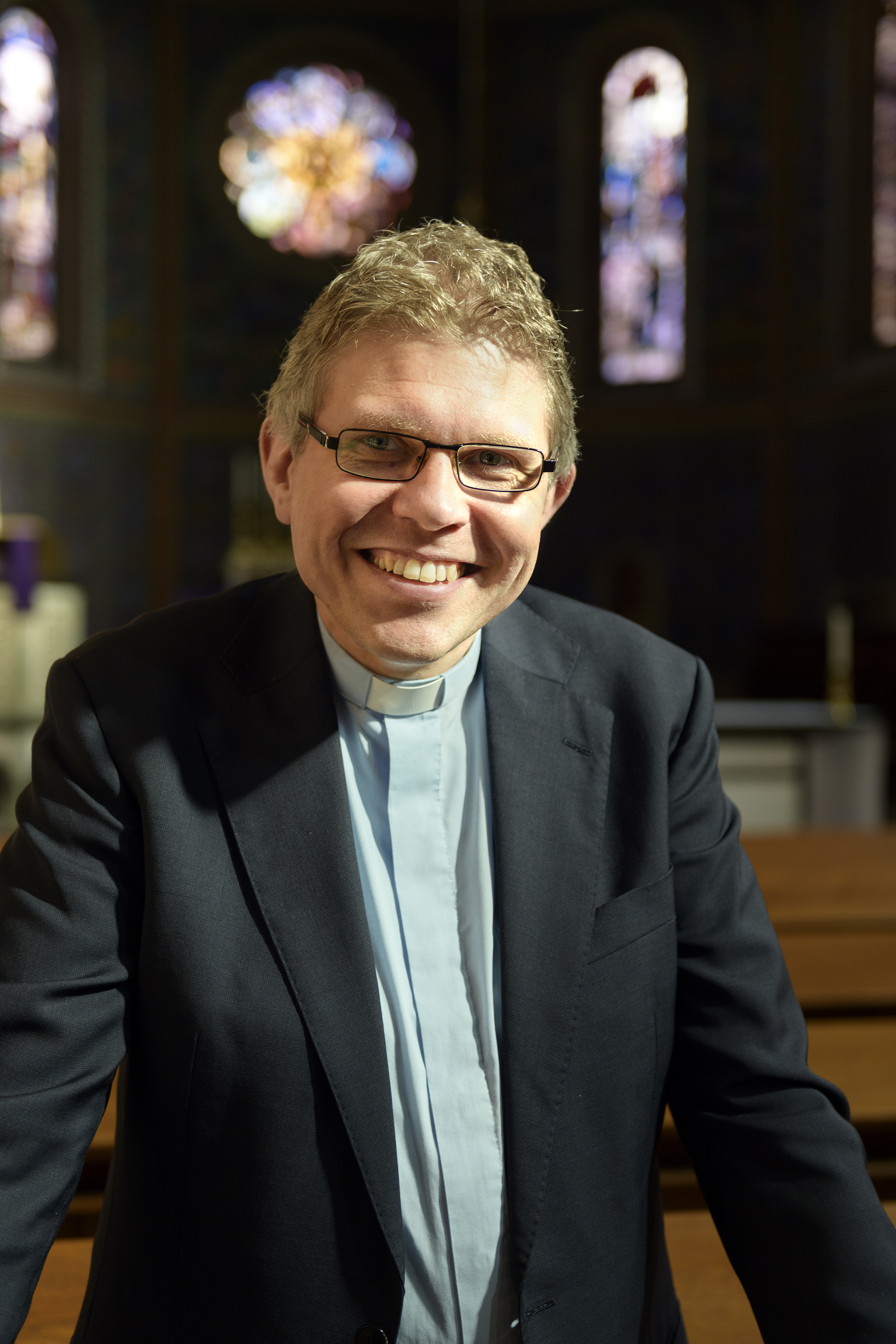
- Church: Old Catholic Church
- Archdiocese: Utrecht
- Elected: 15 February 2020
- In office: 2020 to present
- Predecessor: Joris Vercammen

Orders
- Ordination: 2007 by Joris Vercammen
- Consecration: 18 September 2021 by Dirk Schoon

Personal details
- Born: Barend Theodoor Wallet; February 27, 1971 (age 55) Middelburg, Netherlands
- Education: University of Hull

Bernd Wallet is a Dutch bishop who is currently the 84th Archbishop of Utrecht of the Old Catholic Church of the Netherlands. Elected on 15 February 2020, he was consecrated on 18 September 2021, after two delays due to the COVID-19 pandemic.

== Life and career ==
The son of a pastor of the Dutch Reformed Church, Wallet converted to Old Catholicism and completed his theological studies at the University of Hull in 2005 and from the Old Catholic Seminary in Amersfoort in 2006. He was ordained a deacon in 2006 by Archbishop John Sentamu of the Anglican Diocese of York. One year later, he was ordained a priest by Archbishop Joris Vercammen at St. Gertrude Cathedral in Utrecht.

From 2007 to 2010, Wallet served as assistant curate in Northallerton, in the Diocese of York (Church of England). On his return to the Netherlands, he served as personal assistant to Archbishop Vercammen, responsible for external relations with other Old Catholic churches of the Union of Utrecht as well the Anglican Communion.

Wallet served as pastor of St. Gertrude Cathedral in Utrecht from 2015 to 2020. On 15 February 2020, he was elected Archbishop of Utrecht by the cathedral chapter of Utrecht. At that time, he said, "I want to challenge our parishes to be open houses for those in their areas ... We must continue to be open to society and testify with joy to the hope that is in us."

Wallet's episcopal consecration was first scheduled for 21 June, but was postponed because of the COVID-19 pandemic. On 23 October 2020, the metropolitan chapter of Utrecht announced that the consecration, which had been scheduled for 7 November 2020 (the Feast of St Willibrord, the first bishop of Utrecht), had to be cancelled a second time. He was eventually consecrated as a bishop on 18 September 2021 at the Lebuïnuskerk in Deventer by Old Catholic bishop Dirk Schoon, with bishops Matthias Ring (Catholic Diocese of the Old-Catholics in Germany) and Robert Innes (Church of England) acting as co-consecrators; other bishops of the Church of England, the Episcopal Church, and the Church of Sweden also took part, while the Catholic Church, the Protestant Church of the Netherlands and the Ecumenical Patriarchate of Constantinople sent some delegates without taking part in the ceremony. He was enthroned on the following day in St. Gertrude's Cathedral in Utrecht.

Wallet is married and has children.

Old Catholic Church titles
| Preceded by Joris Vercammen; 2000-2020 | Old Catholic Archbishop of Utrecht; 2020-present | Succeeded by Incumbent |
