= Old Catholic Church in Italy =

The Old Catholic Church in Italy (Italian: Chiesa Vetero-Cattolica in Italia) was a Union of Utrecht of the Old Catholic Churches (UU) mission in Italy until 2011. Some former missions are in full communion with the Anglican Communion.

The church was a mission of the bishop of the Christian Catholic Church of Switzerland (CKS) until 2011. In June of that year CKS Bishop Harald Rein, in agreement with the International Old Catholic Bishops' Conference, decided that the UU would end its mission in Italy "due to the problematic internal situation." The parishes were "offered a model that guarantees their continued pastoral care." For example, a once Old Catholic parish in Florence is now under the jurisdiction of the Church of England.
