= Old Catholic Mission in France =

The Old Catholic Mission in France represents those Christians in France tied to the Utrecht Union of the Old Catholic Churches through the Christian Catholic Church of Switzerland.

It is under the jurisdiction of the International Old Catholic Bishops' Conference.
