= Jacques Jubé =

French priest (1674–1745)

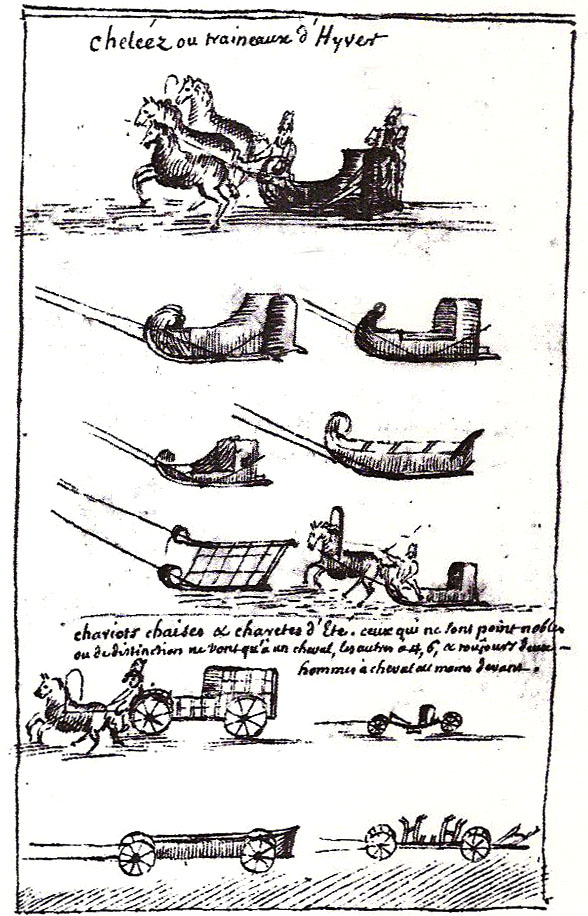
Diagrams of Jubé's Russian voyage

Jacques Jubé sometimes called Jubé de la Cour, (26 March 1674 in Vanves – 19 December 1745 in Paris) was a French priest, teacher, and memoirist. He became known initially in his youth, during the Regency, by his liturgical reforms in the parish of Asnières-sur-Seine. He lived in exile during the second half of his existence, mainly in the Netherlands where he published most of his work. But it is the three years he spent in Russia under the reign of Peter II and Anna of Russia, which attracted the attention of his contemporaries and his principal biographer, historian Michel Mervaud. Jubé resided in Moscow as a chaplain of Princess Irina Dolgorouki who had newly converted to Catholicism, and tutor to the children. The premature death of the young Tsar Peter II put an abrupt end to his projects. Expelled in 1732 by Tsarina Anna, he recorded his experiences in Russia in a book entitled "Religion, morality, and customs of Moscow. This book is one of the few documents of the time describing in detail the customs and daily life in Russia during this period and is distinguished by its many illustrations from the hand of Jubé.

== Early life ==
Jacques Jubé was born in Vanves on 26 March 1674. He came from a working-class family; his father was a laborer and launderer employed by Montargis, lord of Vanves. He began his studies at the Society of Jesus and proceeded to study at Harcourt College. With financial support from the Lamoignon family, he joined the seminar of Saint-Magloire where great figures of Jansenism such as Laurent-François Boursier and Jacques Joseph Duguet were. Jubé befriended his classmate Cornelius Johannes Barchman Wuytiers (1693–1733), the future bishop of the Old Catholic Church of Utrecht. In addition, he showed a keen interest in Catholic theology and pursued a course at the Collège de France where he became knowledgeable in foreign languages, including Hebrew, Syriac, and Arab.

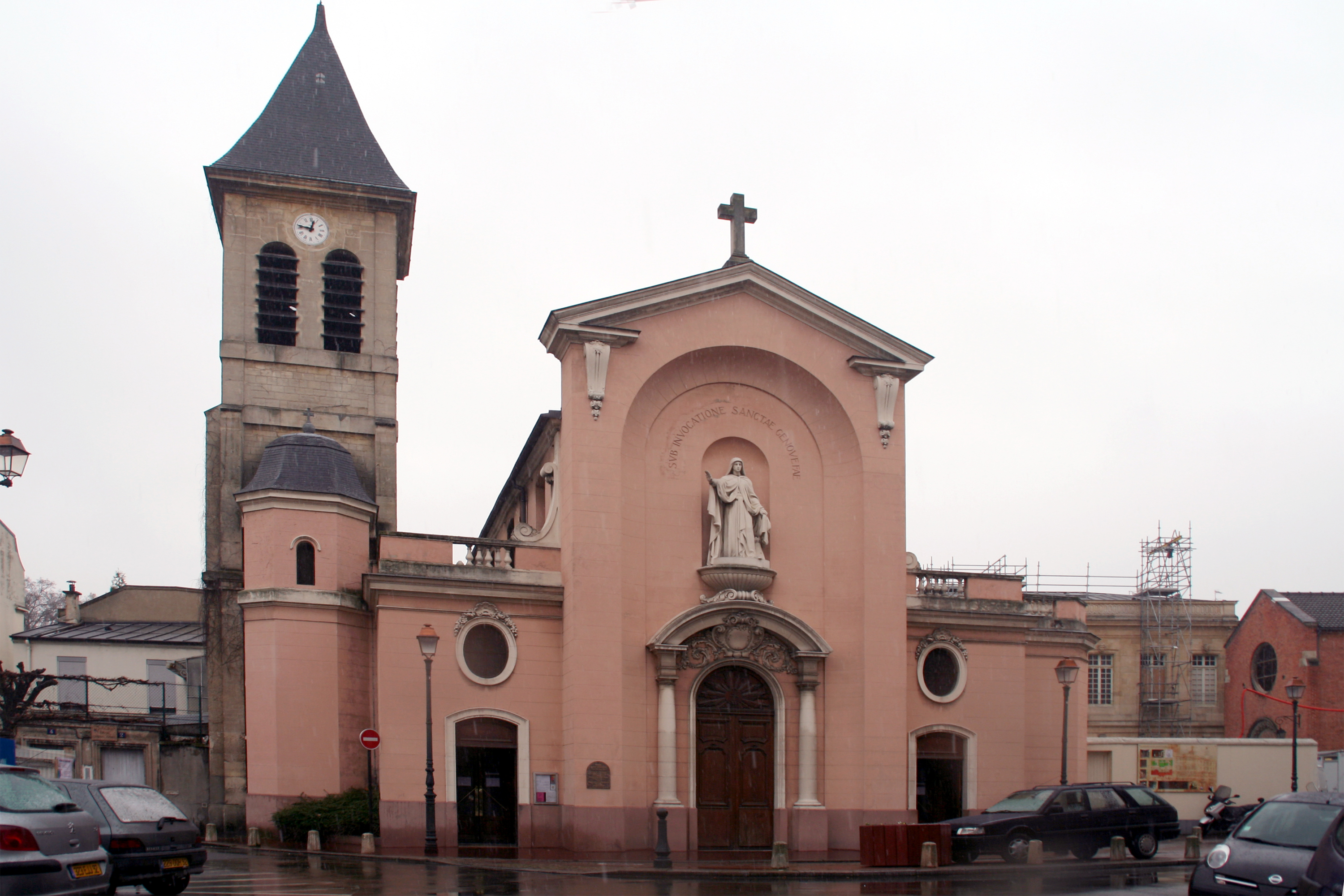
Asnières

He became a priest in 1696 and was assigned the church of Vaugrigneuse in 1698, then that of Asnières-sur-Seine in 1701.
