= Zeger Bernhard van Espen =

Belgian canonist

Zeger Bernhard van Espen (Espenius) (9 July 1646 at Leuven – 2 October 1728 at Amersfoort, Netherlands) was a Belgian canonist, who supported Gallican theories and was an ardent upholder of secular power against religious authority. Van Espen is generally classed among the ablest writers on ecclesiastical law.

== Life ==
He completed his higher studies at old University of Louvain, became priest in 1673, and doctor of civil and canon law in 1675. He soon began to teach canon law at the university where he was obliged to lecture only for six weeks during the summer vacation; the professor might explain one or other important chapter of the decretals, at his choice. He never accepted any other chair at the university, and he resigned even this position in order to devote himself entirely to study.

Espen was a lucid and clarifying expositor of the discipline of the ancient Church. He is accused, not without reason, of having borrowed considerably from the works of his predecessors, notably from Louis Thomassin. He collected the most recent legislative decisions of the Church and discussed them with judgment. He showed with precision the special canon law of Belgium. Pope Benedict XIV recognized his authority in this matter.

The Jansenist quarrels led to Espen's ruin. On being consulted by the Catholics of Holland with regard to the ordination of the Bishop of Utrecht, Cornelius Steenoven, he pronounced in favour of this ordination, which had been performed without the authorization of the Holy See. An attempt has been made to justify Espen's conduct in this matter, on the ground that he merely declared that episcopal ordination performed by a single bishop was valid. This was not the whole question, nor was it indeed the principal question, viz. to determine whether an episcopal ordination, performed without the pope's consent, was admissible.

His action in this matter led to his suspension a divinis by the Bishop of Mechlin. The latter summoned him to make a declaration of orthodox faith. At the order of the civil power, the University of Leuven condemned and deprived Espen of his university functions in 1728.

In the meantime he fled, and took refuge first at Maastricht, and afterwards at Amersfoort, where he found protection in the Jansenist community, and where he died. The Augustinian Bernardus Désirant, professor at the old University of Leuven, was accused of fabricating false documents in the controversy with Espen (the "Forgery of Louvain"). Désirant was condemned by the academical authorities and banished forever from his native country.

== Works ==
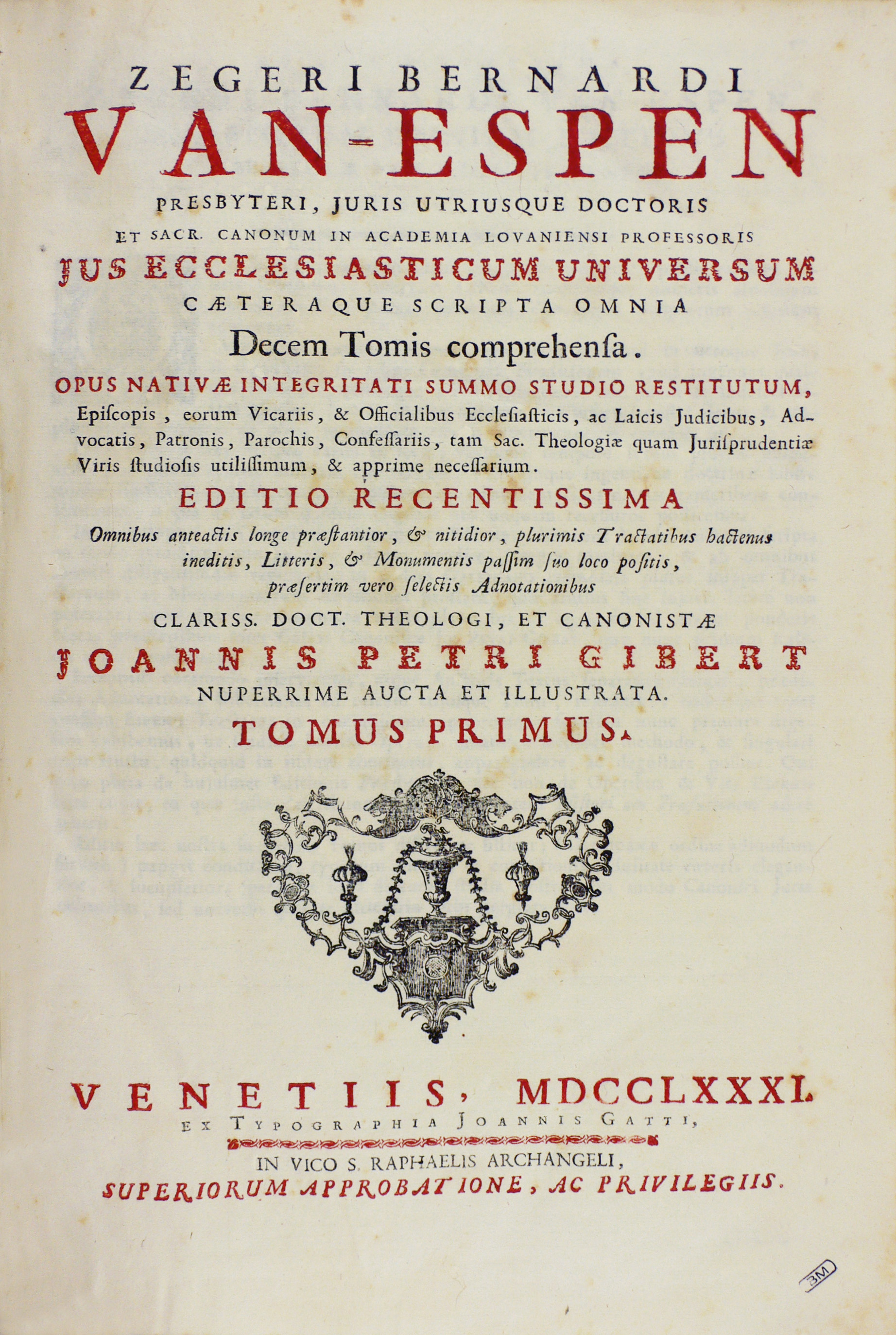
Jus ecclesiasticum universum, 1781.

His Jus canonicum universum was a huge treatise, arguing that the Catholic Church was fundamentally conciliar.

He was a strenuous defender of the Gallican theories, on the right of religious authority and of the civil power. It may be added, however, that he exalted and combated in turn all power, even the civil power. He exalted the power of the bishops in order to lessen that of the religious orders, and the rights of an extinct chapter in order to combat the powers of the Pope. He gained notoriety in the Jansenist conflicts, by denying the importance of the distinction between right and fact with regard to Cornelius Jansen's doctrine; he declared that it was of little consequence to admit that Jansen taught the propositions, condemned in 1713 by Pope Clement XI in Unigenitus, provided the doctrine itself was rejected. His books were listed on the Index of Prohibited Books.

According to Catholic Encyclopedia, the best edition of Ius ecclesiasticum universum was published in Louvain as four volumes in 1753:

- Ius ecclesiasticum universum antiquae et recentiori disciplinae praesertim Belgii, Galliae, Germaniae, & vicinarum Provinciarum accommodatum (in Latin). Vol. 1. Louvain: [s.n.] 1753. OCLC 644938251 – via Bayerische Staatsbibliothek.
- Ius ecclesiasticum universum antiquae et recentiori disciplinae praesertim Belgii, Galliae, Germaniae, & vicinarum Provinciarum accommodatum (in Latin). Vol. 2. Louvain: [s.n.] 1753. OCLC 644938266 – via Bayerische Staatsbibliothek.
- Commentarius in canones juris veteris ac novi, in jus novissimum: opus posthumum hactenus ineditum. Ius ecclesiasticum universum (in Latin). Vol. 3. Louvain: [s.n.] 1753. OCLC 644938283 – via Bayerische Staatsbibliothek.
- Commentarius in canones et decreta juris novi, & in jus novissimum: opus posthumum hactenus ineditum. Ius ecclesiasticum universum (in Latin). Vol. 4. Louvain: [s.n.] 1753. OCLC 644938330 – via Bayerische Staatsbibliothek.

A fifth volume was published at Brussels in 1768, and contains biographical details:

- Supplementum ad varias collectiones operum. Ius ecclesiasticum universum (in Latin). Vol. 5. Bruxellis [u.a.]: Vleminkx Et Flon [u.a.] 1768 – via Bayerische Staatsbibliothek.

Peter-Ben Smit wrote, in Old Catholic and Philippine Independent Ecclesiologies in History, that "the Church of Utrecht used the entirety of the Corpus Juris Canonici," mainly van Espen's Ius Ecclesiasticum Universum and "a considerable body of particular canon law".
