= Joris Vercammen =

Dutch priest (born 1952)

The Most Reverend Joris Vercammen
- Old Catholic Archbishop of Utrecht
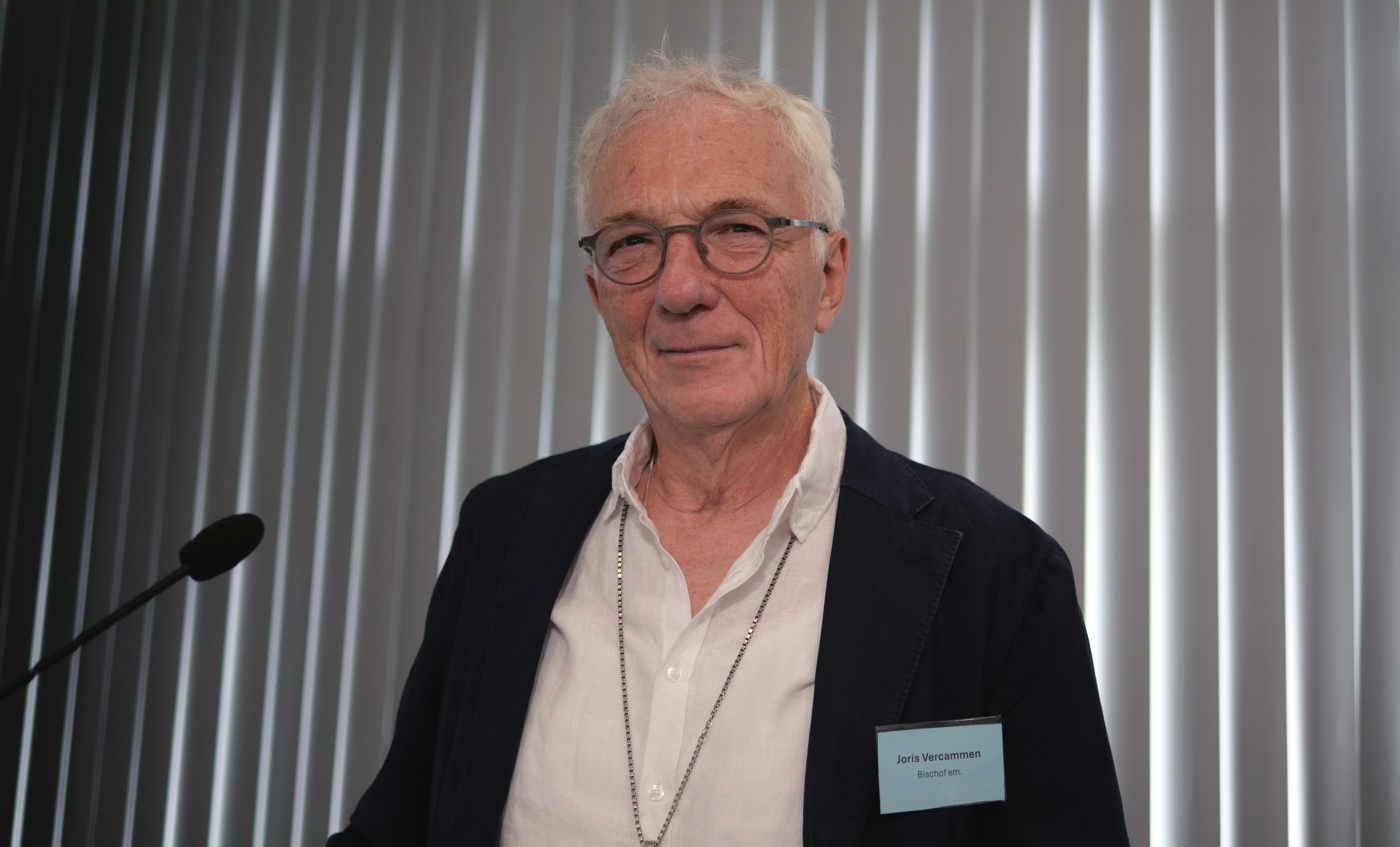
- Church: Old Catholic Church; Roman Catholic Church (formerly)
- Archdiocese: Utrecht
- In office: 2000 to 2020
- Predecessor: Antonius Jan Glazemaker
- Successor: Bernd Wallet

Orders
- Ordination: 1979 (priest)
- Consecration: 1 July 2000

Personal details
- Born: Joris August Odilius Ludovicus Vercammen; 14 October 1952 (age 73)

Joris August Odilius Ludovicus Vercammen (born 14 October 1952) is a Dutch priest who served as the Old Catholic Archbishop of Utrecht of the Old Catholic Church of the Netherlands from 1 July 2000 to 11 January 2020.

== Life and career ==
Vercammen was born in Lier, Belgium, in 1952. In 1979, he was ordained a priest for the Roman Catholic Diocese of Antwerp. In 1988, he left the Roman Catholic Church and was received into the Old Catholic Church of the Netherlands.

Vercammen was serving as rector of the Old Catholic seminary when clergy and laity of the archdiocese elected him as the 83rd Archbishop of Utrecht. He was consecrated on 1 July 2000 at St. Martin's Cathedral, Utrecht, once the see of Willibrord and his successors, but in the hands of the Dutch Reformed Church since 1580. In 2006, the ninth Assembly of the World Council of Churches in Porto Alegre made Vercammen a member of its central committee. On 19 September 2019, Vercammen announced that he would resign as Archbishop of Utrecht effective 11 January 2020.

Vercammen is married and has three children.

Old Catholic Church titles
Preceded by Antonius Jan Glazemaker; 1982-2000	Old Catholic Archbishop of Utrecht; 2000-present	Succeeded by Bernd Wallet
