= Old Catholic Church in Sweden and Denmark =

Swedish church in the Union of Utrecht

The Old Catholic Church in Sweden is the Swedish member church of the Union of Utrecht.

== Old Catholic Church ==
The Old Catholic Church in Sweden has been the Swedish member church of the Union of Utrecht since 1976. It is in full communion with the Anglican Communion (so that members of both communions are permitted to receive the sacraments in one another's churches) and, as of 2016, the national church, the Church of Sweden. It has parishes and small groups scattered around Sweden, with its stronghold in the south. The Church is under the episcopal oversight of the International Bishops Conference. The Bishop of Haarlem, the Right Reverend Dirk Schoon has oversight.

There is also one parish in Denmark.
