= Willibrord van Os =

Catholic archbishop of Utrecht

- Old Catholic Archbishop of Utrecht
- Church: Old Catholic Church
- Archdiocese: Utrecht
- In office: 1814–1825
- Predecessor: Johannes Jacobus van Rhijn
- Successor: Johannes van Santen

Orders
- Consecration: 24 April 1814 by Gisbertus de Jong

Personal details
- Died: 28 February 1825

Willibrord van Os served as the thirteenth Archbishop of Utrecht from 1814 to 1825.

== Early ministry ==
Before serving as Archbishop of Utrecht, van Os served as grand vicar of the Archbishop of Utrecht.

After the death of Archbishop Johannes Jacobus van Rhijn, King Louis Bonaparte forbade the Chapter of Utrecht to elect a successor. After Louis’ resignation in 1810, the kingdom was annexed to the French Empire, and his brother, Napoleon, visited Utrecht in 1811. According to C.B. Moss, van Os met Napoleon and resisted the emperor’s plan to confiscate the revenues of the Church. Neale writes: “He boldly and resolutely withstood the man to whose iron will Pius VII had yielded.”

== Archbishop of Utrecht ==
Before Napoleon could bring Utrecht into submission to the Roman Catholic Church, the French were driven from the Netherlands, and the Chapter of Utrecht chose van Os as bishop-elect. He was consecrated by Bishop Gisbertus de Jong on 24 April 1814.

== Death ==
Van Os died at Amersfoort on 28 February 1825.

Catholic Church titles
Preceded by Johannes Jacobus van Rhijn; 1797-1808	Old Catholic Archbishop of Utrecht; 1814-1825	Succeeded by Johannes van Santen; 1825-1858
