= Johannes van Santen =

Archbishop of Utrecht from 1825 to 1858

- Old Catholic Archbishop of Utrecht
- Church: Old Catholic Church
- Archdiocese: Utrecht
- In office: 1825-1858
- Predecessor: Willibrord van Os
- Successor: Henricus Loos

Orders
- Consecration: 13 November 1825

Johannes van Santen served as the fourteenth Archbishop of Utrecht from 1825 to 1858. He was part of the last attempt of the Church of Utrecht to reconcile with the Roman Catholic Church at that time.

== Early ministry ==
Before serving as Archbishop of Utrecht, van Santen served as a parish priest in Schiedam.

== Archbishop of Utrecht ==
Two days after the consecration of William Vet as Bishop of Deventer on 12 June 1825, an event that enjoyed the approval of King William I of the Netherlands, the Chapter of Utrecht chose van Santen as bishop-elect. He was consecrated Archbishop of Utrecht in the cathedral of St. Gertrude in Utrecht on 13 November 1825.

== Attempt at reconciliation with the Roman Catholic Church ==
In 1827, when the Catholic Church had a new concordat with the United Kingdom of the Netherlands, Archbishop van Santen attended a series of meetings with Monsignor Capaccini, the papal nuncio of the Roman Catholic Church, in an attempt to reconcile the two churches. C.B. Moss says: "The first conference was entirely occupied by compliments paid by Capaccini to the 'Jansenists' in general and to Archbishop van Santen in particular; he praised their steadfastness in a Protestant country, their firm adhesion to Rome, the stand they had made against lax casuistry, the carefulness and prudence of the archbishop."

During the second meeting, van Santen refused to sign the Formulary of Alexander VII that was presented by Capaccini, thus condemning five propositions purportedly contained in the Augustinus and affirming the authority of the pope. According to C.B. Moss, van Santen replied: "I know that the Five Propositions, as condemned, are not contained in that book; how can I, then, as an honest man and a Christian, sign a declaration which denies the fact? I must obey God and my conscience, even in the Pope and the whole Church are misinformed." Purportedly asking, "Is Catholic unity to be maintained by perjury?", van Santen is likened by many to Martin Luther, for their stands against the hierarchy of the Roman Catholic Church.

C.B. Moss concludes: "If [van Santen] had accepted the Formulary, and his two suffragans with him, their names would have been acclaimed throughout the Roman Catholic world…as the men who by their submission had healed the 'Jansenist schism'; …And yet he would not, for any advantage in this world or the next, declare that to be true which he was quite sure was false. He knew that conscience has a more binding authority than either Pope or Church."

On 4 March 1853 Pius IX negotiated with the Dutch Government to establish a new hierarchy in the Netherlands, with a Roman Catholic archbishop in Utrecht and four suffragan bishops in Haarlem, 's-Hertogenbosch, Breda and Roermond but with no boundaries corresponding to the sees erected by the Roman Catholic Church in 1559. Van Santen, together with Bishop of Haarlem Henricus Johannes van Buul, issued a formal protest against the rival bishops in the sees they already occupied.

== Protest of the Immaculate Conception ==
When Pius IX issued the papal bull Ineffabilis Deus on 8 December 1854, proclaiming the dogma of the Immaculate Conception of Mary, van Santen responded with formal protest. On 14 September 1856 he and his two suffragans, Bishop Henricus Johannes van Buul of Haarlem and Hermannus Heykamp of Deventer, penned a letter to Pius IX, protesting the new dogma on three grounds: that it was contrary to scripture and tradition, that the bishops of the Church had never been consulted about it, and that it was a novel, false doctrine. They appealed this doctrine to a future ecumenical council of the Church.

Catholic Church titles
| Preceded by Willibrord van Os; 1814-1825 | Old Catholic Archbishop of Utrecht; 1825-1858 | Succeeded by Henricus Loos; 1858-1873 |
