= Petrus Johannes Meindaerts =

18th-century Old Catholic Archbishop of Utrecht

- Old Catholic Archbishop of Utrecht
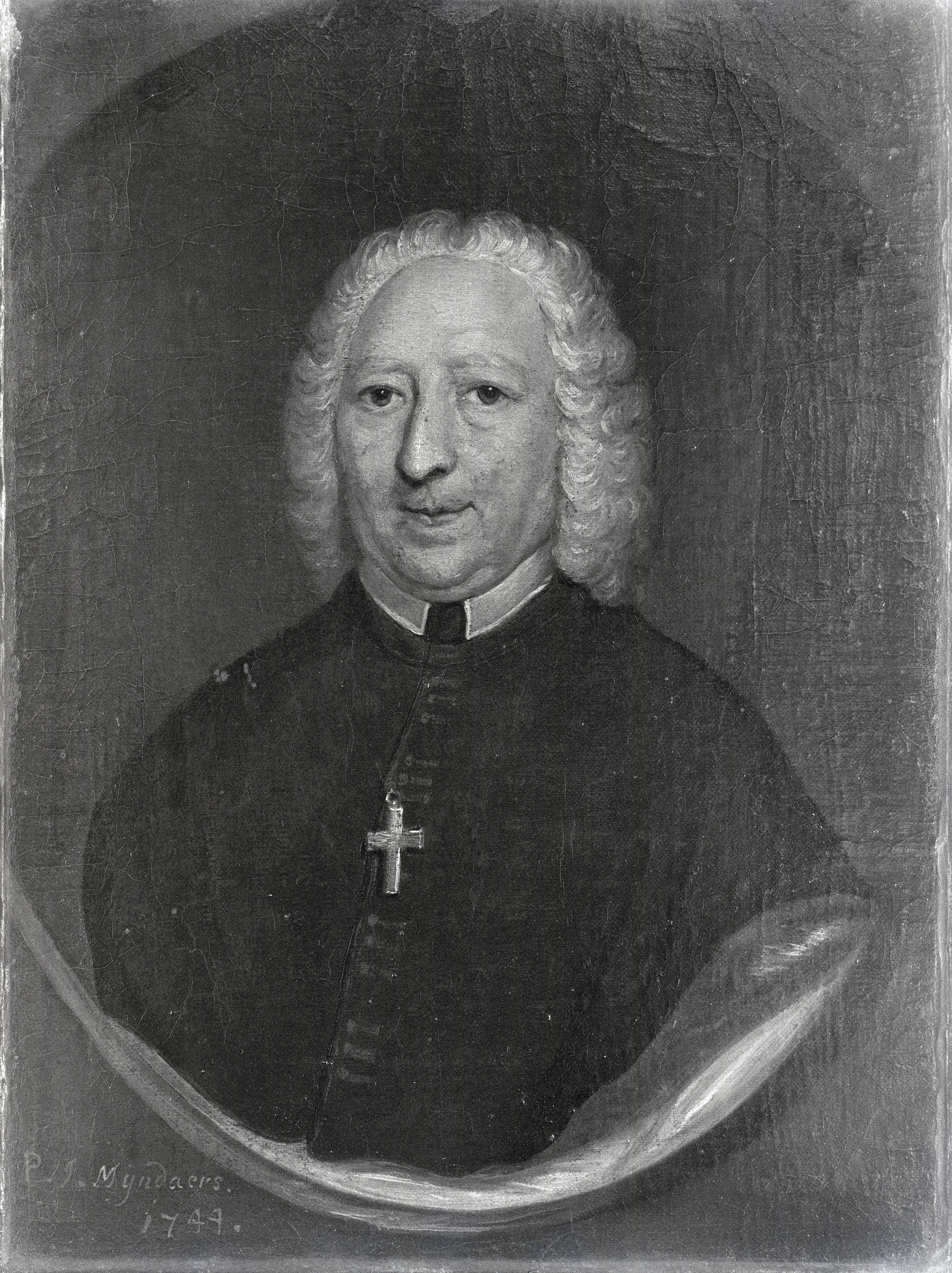
- Church: Old Catholic Church
- Archdiocese: Utrecht
- In office: 1739–1767
- Predecessor: Theodorus van der Croon
- Successor: Walter van Nieuwenhuisen

Orders
- Consecration: 18 October 1739 by Dominique Marie Varlet

Personal details
- Born: 7 November 1684 Groningen
- Died: 31 October 1767 (aged 82)

Petrus Johannes Meindaerts (7 November 1684 in Groningen – 31 October 1767) served as the tenth Archbishop of Utrecht from 1739 to 1767. After the death of his consecrator, Bishop Dominique Marie Varlet, Meindaerts consecrated other bishops, such that all later Old Catholic bishops derive their apostolic succession from him, as the bishops before him died before they could consecrate others.

== Early ministry ==
Meindaerts was ordained to the priesthood in Ireland by Roman Catholic Bishop Luke Fagan of Meath, Ireland. According to C.B. Moss, Meindaerts arrived in Ireland in the late summer of 1716 and was arrested on suspicion of being a Jacobite spy, avoiding imprisonment by convincing an officer familiar with Louvain that he was a student at the university there.

Meindaerts subsequently served as Archpriest of Leeuwarden and a Dean of Friesland.

== Archbishop of Utrecht ==
Following the death of Theodorus van der Croon, Archbishop of Utrecht, on 9 June 1739, the Chapter of Utrecht elected Meindaerts as bishop-elect. On 18 October 1739 he was consecrated by Bishop Dominique Marie Varlet, former Roman Catholic Bishop of the Diocese of Babylon. Meindaerts was subsequently excommunicated for this act by Benedict XIV.

At the time, 52 parishes acknowledged the jurisdiction of Meindaerts: 33 in the Diocese of Utrecht, 17 in Haarlem, one in Leeuwarden, and one in Nordstrand, Germany.

== Consecration of other bishops ==
After Varlet's death on 14 May 1742, Meindaerts set himself to the task of ensuring apostolic succession within the Old Catholic Church. On 2 September 1742 he consecrated Hieronymus de Bock as Bishop of Haarlem, a see left vacant by the Roman Catholic Church since 1587. Upon Bock's death, he consecrated John van Stiphout as Bishop of Haarlem on 11 July 1745.

After three failed attempts of reunion with the Roman Catholic Church, Meindaerts consecrated a third bishop on 25 January 1758: Bartholomew John Byeveld, who served as Bishop of Deventer, a titular bishopric with no parishes. The consecration was denounced by Benedict XIV, and Meindaerts responded with a letter that was translated to French, Latin, Italian, Spanish and Portuguese. Three editions of his French letter were reprinted.

== 1763 Provincial Synod of Utrecht ==
In 1763, Meindaerts convened the first synod in Utrecht since 1565, for the purpose of condemning the work of Pierre Le Clere, a French subdeacon living in Amsterdam. A total of twenty clerics gathered for the synod at the St. Gertrude Cathedral in Utrecht. The synod asserted the divine right of monarchs and condemned several works. It also approved 24 canons, including the warning that those who did not receive the Church's sacrament of Confirmation risked salvation—a canon that is interesting insofar as no Roman Catholic bishop celebrated the sacrament in the Dutch Republic from 1703 to 1827, thus creating an opportunity for the bishops of the Old Catholic Church, who were the sole dispensers of this now-necessary sacrament. C.B. Moss says, “The acts of the synod were very well received throughout Roman Catholic Europe, and many [Roman Catholic] bishops sent letters of congratulations and communion to Archbishop Meindaerts.”

Religious titles
Preceded by Theodorus van der Croon; 1734-1739	Old Catholic Archbishop of Utrecht; 1739-1768	Succeeded by Walter van Nieuwenhuisen; 1768-1797
