= Gerardus Gul =

19th and 20th-century Dutch Catholic bishop

- Old Catholic Archbishop of Utrecht
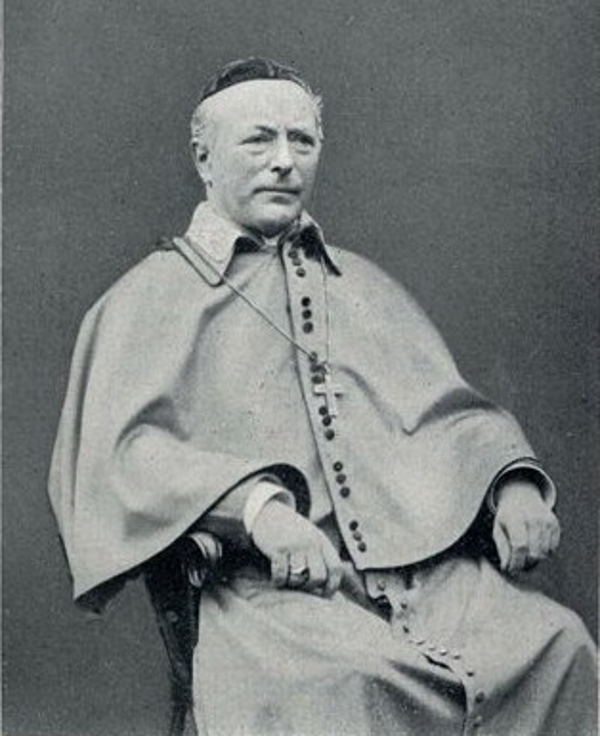
- Church: Old Catholic Church
- Archdiocese: Utrecht
- In office: 1892–1920
- Predecessor: Johannes Heykamp
- Successor: Franciscus Kenninck

Orders
- Ordination: 1870
- Consecration: 11 May 1892 by Casparus Johannes Rinkel

Personal details
- Born: 27 October 1847 Egmond aan Zee
- Died: 9 February 1920 (aged 72) Utrecht
- Denomination: Old Catholic
- Parents: Jan Gul, Angel Tol

Gerardus Gul (27 October 1847 – 9 February 1920) served as the seventeenth Archbishop of Utrecht from 1892 to 1920. He is known for his role in assisting the persons who would later found the Polish National Catholic Church in the United States, as well as for consecrating Arnold Harris Mathew, the founder and first bishop of the Old Catholic Church in Great Britain.

== Early ministry ==
Before serving as Archbishop of Utrecht, Gul graduated from the Old Catholic seminary at Amersfoort in 1870 and subsequently served as a parish priest at Ss. John and Willibrord in Amsterdam, St. Mary Magdalene in Zaandam, and at St. James in Utrecht. In 1886, he became a pastor in Hilversum.

== Archbishop of Utrecht ==
Following the death of Johannes Heykamp, Archbishop of Utrecht, on 8 January 1892, Gul was consecrated Archbishop of Utrecht on 11 May 1892 by Bishop Gaspardus Johannes Rinkel of Haarlem, Bishop Cornelius Diependaal of Deventer, and Bishop Joseph Hubert Reinkens of Bonn.

== Polish National Catholic Church ==
On 21 November 1897, Gul assisted Eduard Herzog of the Swiss Christian Catholic Church and Theodor Weber of the Old Catholic Church of Germany with the consecration of Antonius Stanislas Kozłowski, who was elected by a number of Polish congregations in Chicago that were dissatisfied with the control exercised over their church properties by mostly-Irish Roman Catholic bishops. These churches would later organize into the Polish National Catholic Church.

On 29 September 1907, at Utrecht, Gul consecrated Franciszek Hodur, from Scranton, Pennsylvania, for the Polish National Catholic Church, assisted by Johannes Jacobus van Thiel, Bishop of Haarlem, and Nicholas B. P. Spit, Bishop of Deventer.

On 5 October 1909, Gul consecrated Jan Maria Michał Kowalski the first Minister Generalis (Minister General) of the Order of the Mariavites.

== Consecration of Arnold Harris Mathew ==
In 1908, the Union of Utrecht approved the establishment of a mission in Great Britain, and on 28 April 1908 Gul consecrated Arnold Harris Mathew at St. Gertrude's Cathedral in Utrecht for the purpose of establishing the Old Catholic Church in the United Kingdom.

Old Catholic Church titles
Preceded by Johannes Heykamp; 1875-1892	Old Catholic Archbishop of Utrecht; 1892-1920	Succeeded by Franciscus Kenninck; 1920-1937
