= St. Gertrude's Cathedral =

Coordinates: 52°5′20″N 5°7′0″E

- Sint-Gertrudiskathedraal
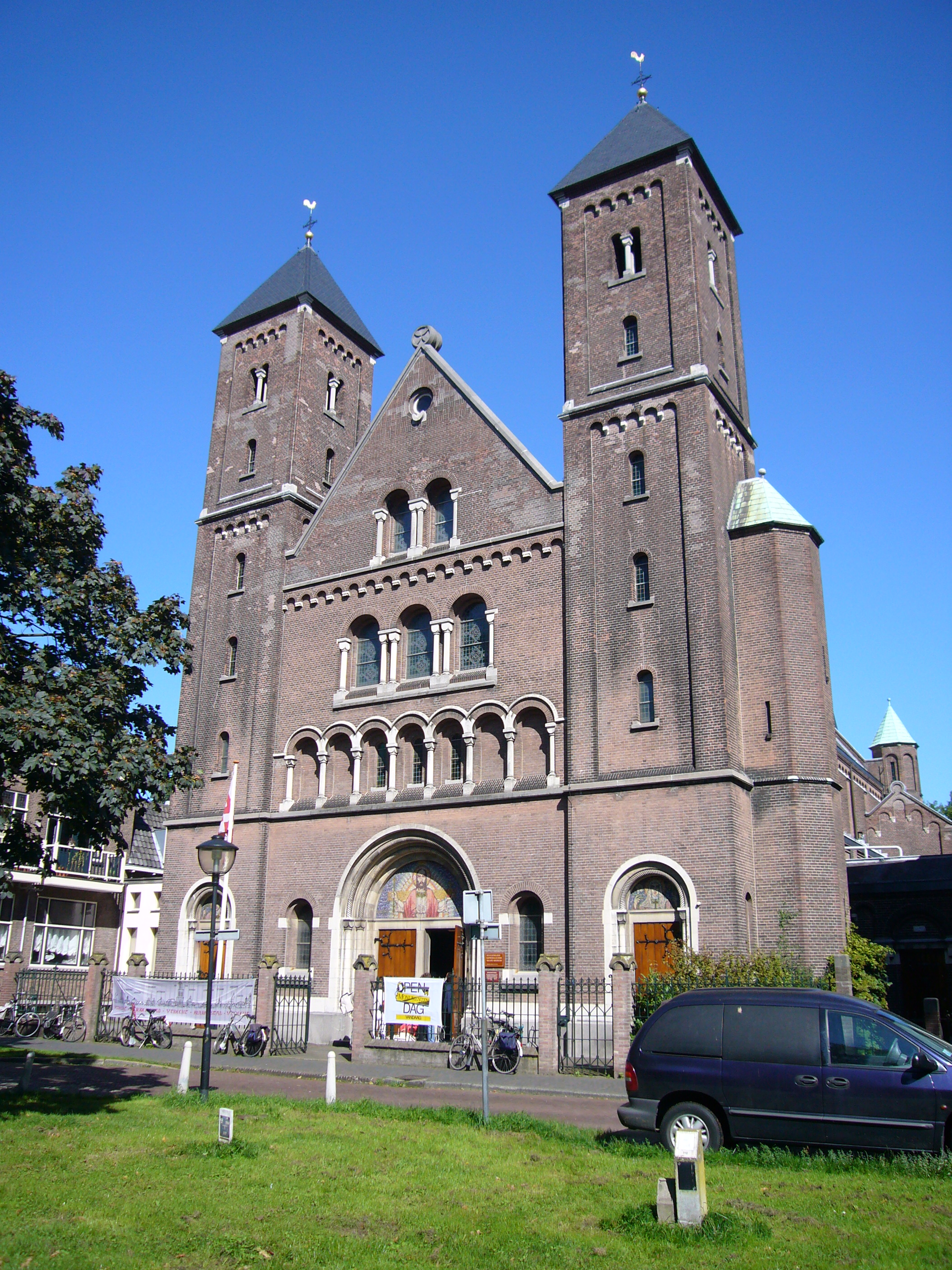
- Façade of St. Gertrude's Cathedral
- St. Gertrude's Cathedral
- Country: Netherlands
- Denomination: Old Catholic Church

St. Gertrude's Cathedral (Dutch: Sint-Gertrudiskathedraal) in Utrecht, the Netherlands, is the seat of the Archbishop of Utrecht and the mother church of the Old Catholic Church of the Netherlands (and of the wider Old Catholic Communion).

It is located at Willemsplantsoen, at the edge of the city centre. The current church building was constructed between 1912 and 1914, and was designed by E.G. Wentinck (nl) in Neo-Romanesque style, echoing St. Mary's Church, which formerly stood on the Mariaplaats, very close by.

In the altar there are more than 1700 relics in hundreds of containers. Underneath these relics there is supposed to be a piece of a rib of St. Willibrord.

== St. Gertrude's Chapel ==
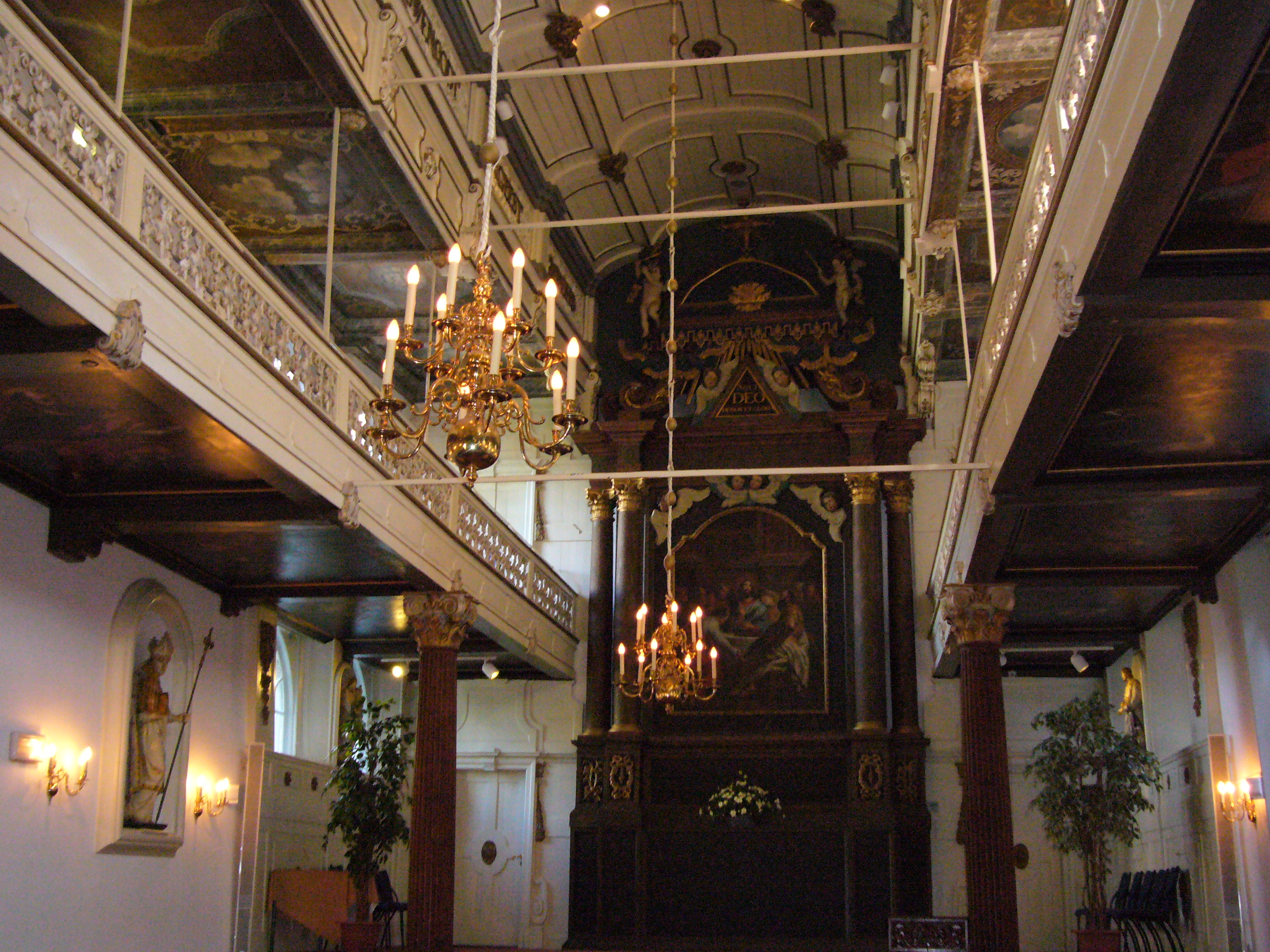
Interior of St. Gertrude's Chapel

The predecessor to the current building, called St. Gertrude's Chapel (Dutch: Gertrudiskapel), has been preserved, and is attached to the current cathedral. It was built in 1634 within a mediaeval house as a clandestine church for the members of the Roman Catholic parish of the Geertekerk (nl) (the original St. Gertrude's Church, now in the possession of the Remonstrants).

== See also ==
- Old Catholic Church
- Union of Utrecht (Old Catholic)
