= Walter van Nieuwenhuisen =

Dutch archbishop

Walter Michael van Nieuwenhuisen
- Old Catholic Archbishop of Utrecht
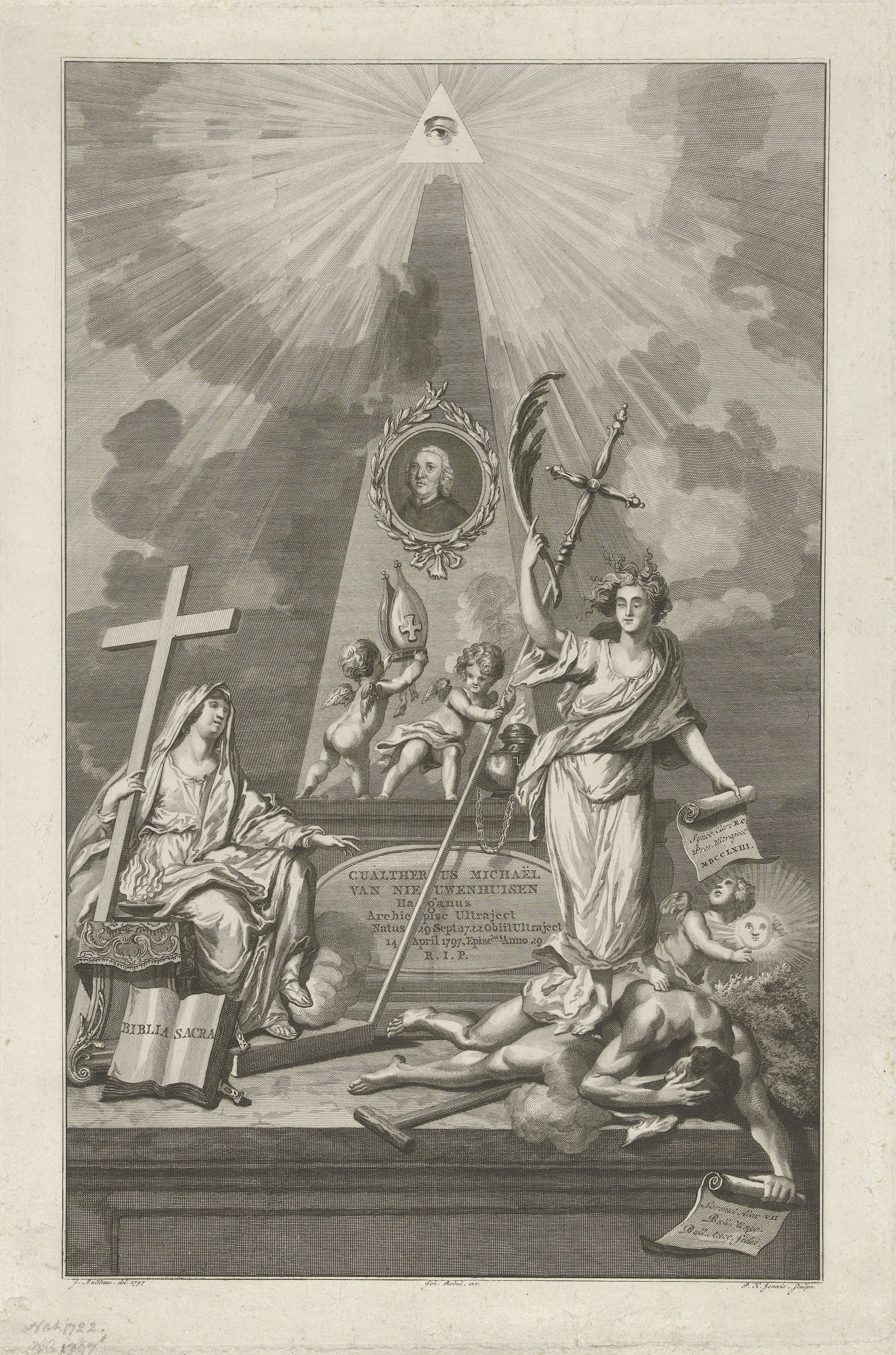
- Church: Old Catholic Church
- Archdiocese: Utrecht
- In office: 1768–1797
- Predecessor: Petrus Johannes Meindaerts
- Successor: Johannes Jacobus van Rhijn

Orders
- Consecration: 7 February 1768 by Johannes van Stiphout & Bartholomaeus Johannes Byeveld

Personal details
- Died: 14 April 1797

Walter Michael van Nieuwenhuisen served as the eleventh Archbishop of Utrecht from 1768 to 1797.

== Early ministry ==
Before serving as Archbishop of Utrecht, van Nieuwenhuisen served as a parish priest in Dordrecht.

== Archbishop of Utrecht ==
Following the death of Petrus Johannes Meindaerts, Archbishop of Utrecht, on 31 October 1767, the Chapter of Utrecht unanimously elected van Nieuwenhuisen as bishop elect. On 7 February 1768 he was consecrated by Bishop Johannes van Stiphout of Haarlem and Bishop Bartholomaeus Johannes Byeveld of Deventer. Despite van Nieuwenhuisen’s excommunication by the Roman Catholic Church for this act, C.B. Moss says, “The new archbishop received letters of communion from [Roman Catholic] bishops in France, Germany, Italy, and Spain, and from a large number of [Roman Catholic] priests, who recognized fully, not only that the Church of Utrecht was orthodox in doctrine, but also that her claims to canonical jurisdiction were sound.”

== Death ==
Van Nieuwenhuisen died on Good Friday, 14 April 1797.

== Sources ==
Moss, C.B. (1948). The Old Catholic Movement: Its Origins and History. Berkeley, CA: The Apocryphal Press. ISBN 9780976402596.

Catholic Church titles
Preceded by Petrus Johannes Meindaerts; 1739-1767	Old Catholic Archbishop of Utrecht; 1768-1797	Succeeded by Johannes Jacobus van Rhijn; 1797-1808
