= Marc Bergier =

Marc Bergier (c. 1667 – November 9, 1707) was a Roman Catholic priest and vicar general of the Bishop of Quebec, Saint-Vallier La Croix, for the Mississippi Region.

Father Bergier was in charge of the mission to the Tamaroa at Cahokia, Illinois from 1700 succeeding Father Jean-François Buisson de Saint-Cosme, the founder of the Sainte-Famille mission.

Bergier's dedication to his Indian parisheners was all consuming and, no doubt, contributed significantly to his death. His dedication was considered to be greater than that of St Francis Xavier.
