= Cornelius van Steenoven =

18th-century Dutch theologian and priest

- Old Catholic Archbishop of Utrecht
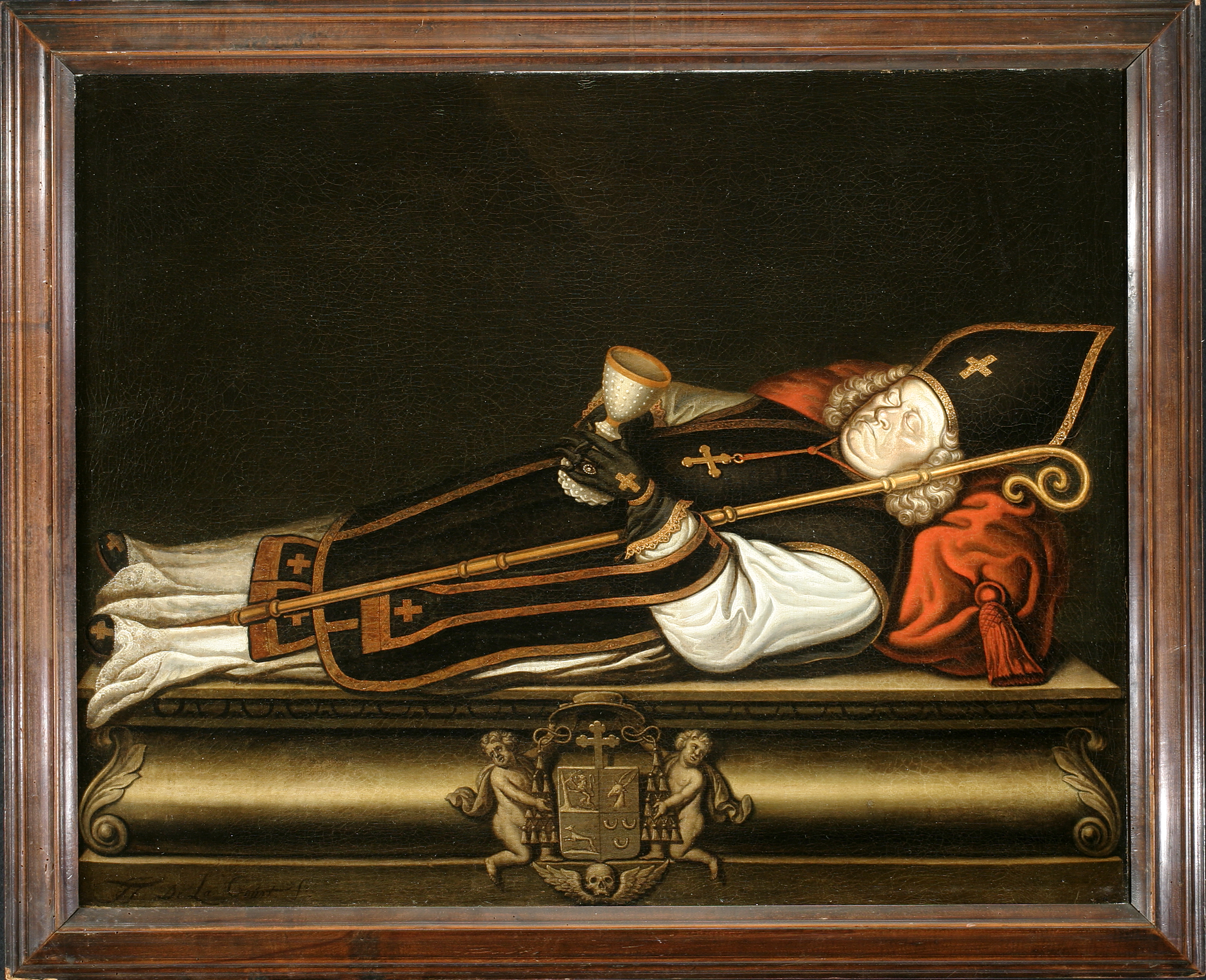
- Church: Old Catholic Church
- Archdiocese: Utrecht
- Elected: April 27, 1723
- In office: 1724-1725
- Predecessor: Petrus Codde
- Successor: Cornelius Johannes Barchman Wuytiers

Orders
- Consecration: October 15, 1724 by Dominique Marie Varlet

Personal details
- Died: Leiden
- Denomination: Old Catholic

Cornelis van Steenoven (died April 3, 1725) was a Dutch priest who served as the first Old Catholic Archbishop of Utrecht from 1724 to 1725. Consecrated without the permission of the pope, Steenoven was at the center of the 18th-century controversy between national churches and the Catholic Church.

== Education and early ministry ==
Steenoven was educated in Louvain, then in Rome, where he received his Doctor of Theology. He was ordained a priest in 1689. Steenoven served as a pastor in Amersfoort from 1692 to 1719. Beginning in 1700, Steenoven served as a canon of the Cathedral Chapter of Utrecht, which was suspended by Rome in 1700 after a conflict during the time of Petrus Codde, the former Archbishop of Utrecht, whom Steenoven came to know in Rome. Like van der Croon, a later Old Catholic Archbishop of Utrecht, van Steenoven was one of 300 priests in six diocese who had previously signed a protest in support of Archbishop Petrus Codde in 1700 or 1701. In 1719, Steenoven was elected vicar general of the Chapter of Utrecht and served in this capacity together with Gisbert van Dyck under the Chapter's dean, John Christian van Erkel.

== Election as Archbishop of Utrecht ==
The Chapter of Utrecht convened at The Hague on April 27, 1723. All eight canons were present: John Christian van Erkel (dean), Steenoven and Gilbert van Dyck (vicars general), Daellenoort, Oosterling, van der Croon, Kemp, and Broedersen. In addition to the canons, other priests were present, including Jacob Krys and van Haen. After the Mass of the Holy Ghost, the canons prepared to advance the rights of the Catholic episcopate over the papacy by electing their own archbishop. They adopted a measure to proceed with an election by scrutiny; Jacob Krys served as protonotary of the election, and two non-canon priests served as witnesses. Steenoven received the majority of votes and was named Archbishop-elect of Utrecht.

== Requests for consecration ==
The Chapter of Utrecht and the archbishop-elect asked Pope Innocent XIII to permit the consecration of Steenoven, but they received no response. The election of Steenoven as Archbishop-elect of Utrecht became the conversation of the European Catholic Church, with various voices wondering whether Rome would allow the election, whether the canons would persevere in advocating for their right to elect their own archbishop, whether three bishops could be found to consecrate the archbishop-elect, and whether a single bishop would dare to perform the consecration alone. French Bishop and Jansenist theologian Pierre de Langle (of the Diocese of Boulogne in Northern France), wrote: "I can think of nothing except the present state of the glorious church of Utrecht.”

On August 4, 1723, the Chapter of Utrecht sent a second letter to the pope. Having received no response to their previous two communications, they sent a third letter to the pope on December 29, 1723. In the meantime, van Erkel kept the conversation alive on the rights of national churches to elect their own prelates. Ultramontane voices favoring the power of the papacy penned responses, including a dialogue between Warmond and Regthart, and a letter from a doctor in Louvain to a friend in Holland on the supposed rights of "the so-called Chapter of Utrecht."

On March 9, 1724, the Chapter of Utrecht sent a letter to all Catholic bishops on the sufferings of the Church of Utrecht, then received news of the death of Pope Innocent XIII on March 7. Pope Innocent XIII did not confirm Steenoven's election, but neither did he condemn it; the hope was had that his successor might more kindly look upon the plight of the Church of Utrecht. Steenoven and van Dyck, in their capacity as vicars general of the Chapter, published a pastoral letter asking for the prayers of the faithful for the deceased pope. The next day, on April 8, 1724, the cardinals of the Catholic Church met in conclave and issued a letter in which they reproached the Chapter of Utrecht. The Internuncio also denounced the work of the Chapter of Utrecht in a widely-disbursed pamphlet addressed to all Catholics in Holland. The Chapter responded with a firm reply to the Internuncio. The Chapter also issued a letter to all Catholic deans and chapters, urging them to stand against the papacy's invasion of local church rights; they also wrote to the universities of Louvain, Douai, Paris, Rheims, Nantes, Caen, Poitiers, Cologne, Vienna, Prague, and Strasbourg. On the dearth of replies to the communications of the Chapter of Utrecht, Kemp wrote: "Verily, they were all dumb dogs—they could not bark! Let them all, let bishops, canons, universities, be silent! Such a silence, noble clergy and illustrious Chapter [of Utrecht], is a clear proof that your Archbishop has been well and validly elected, and that you may proceed with full assurance to his consecration.”

On May 29, 1724, Cardinal Orsini was elected to the vacant see as Pope Benedict XIII. Having appealed to him and received no response, the Chapter of Utrecht asked neighboring bishops to come to their aid and consecrate Steenoven. The well-known French bishop and Jansenist Charles de Caylus is said to have replied: "If I were in the country, I wouldn't have the slightest difficulty in imposing my hands [on the archbishop-elect]." The Bishops of Antwerp, Arras, and Saint-Omer (or Audomar) expressed sympathy for the plight of the Church of Utrecht. On July 30, the Bishop of Antwerp consecrated his brother as titular bishop of Rhodes, presumably with papal approval, but made the shrewd move of doing so alone, without the assistance of any other bishop, as if to encourage another bishop to act alone in assisting the Church of Utrecht.

Dom Thierry de Viaixnvs seems to have inquired into the thoughts of French bishops on the matter. In a letter to the Chapter of Utrecht dated September 10, 1724, he shared that the Bishops of Montpelier, Senez and Auxerre were in favor of Steenoven's consecration, and that, as far as he could tell, the bishops of Bayeux, Pamiers, Macon, Rhodez, Angoulerne, Metz, Troyes, and the ex-bishop of Tourney were of the same opinion. Eighteen months after the election of the archbishop-elect, on October 13, 1724, the Chapter of Utrecht wrote to Dominique Marie Varlet, former Bishop of Babylon, who now resided in Amsterdam. They restated their case, saying: "We are as sheep that have no shepherd who may be Christ’s vicar in our Church: by [God], then, Who is the Shepherd and Bishop of our souls, we beseech, entreat, and conjure you to give us the desire of our hearts. What will be your praise in the Catholic Church, if you raise up again a Church that has almost fallen...that when [God] shall renew His signs, and shall do wondrously, it may minister to the execution of His counsels?” Varlet consented to consecrate Steenoven as Archbishop of Utrecht.

== Consecration as Archbishop of Utrecht ==
Two days later, on Sunday, October 15, 1724, in the presence of the Chapter of Utrecht, Steenoven was consecrated by Varlet in the bishop's private chapel in Amsterdam. The consecration took place at 6:00 a.m., to accommodate parish priests (viz., Jacob Krys, Luke Ahuys, and Theodore Doncker) who celebrated Sunday services in their parishes later in the morning. Varlet was assisted during the ceremony by van Erkel and Daellenoort. Letters of congratulations were penned by several bishops, including Charles-Joachim Colbert de Croissy of Montpellier, Charles de Caylus of Auxerre, de Lorraine of Bayeux, de Tilladet of Mâcon, de Verthamon of Pamiers, Soanen of Senez Tourourre of Rhodez, Dreuillet of Bayonne, d’Arbreuve of Dax, de Corslin of Tarbes, Meaupon of Lombez, Beaujen of Castres, de Verthamon of Lugon. Through the consecration of Steenoven without papal approval, it was a definite break with from the Catholic Church.

== Censure by the Catholic Church ==
After his consecration, Archbishop Steenoven wrote to Pope Benedict XIII and other chief Catholic bishops to inform them of his consecration. He wrote a manifesto explaining the principles on which he and his clergy had acted, appealing to a future General Council of the church. On February 21, 1725, Pope Benedict XIII issued a brief declaring the election of Steenoven null and void, calling his consecration "illicit and execrable," and censuring Bishop Varlet. The "Utrecht Schism" resulted in the birth of the Old Catholic Church of the Netherlands, which was also known as the "Jansenistenkerk."

== Death ==
By the time the papal brief reached The Netherlands, Steenoven was seriously ill. He died on April 3, 1725, less than six months after his consecration as Archbishop of Utrecht. He was buried in the Reform Church of Warmond.

Catholic Church titles
Preceded by Petrus Codde; 1688-1710	Old Catholic Archbishop of Utrecht; 1724-1725	Succeeded by Cornelius Johannes Barchman Wuytiers; 1725-1733
