= Johannes Jacobus van Rhijn =

Dutch archbishop

- Old Catholic Archbishop of Utrecht
- Church: Old Catholic Church
- Archdiocese: Utrecht
- In office: 1797-1808
- Predecessor: Walter van Nieuwenhuisen
- Successor: Willibrord van Os

Orders
- Consecration: 5 July 1797 by Adrianus Johannes Broekman & Nicolas Nellemans

Personal details
- Died: 24 June 1808

Johannes Jacobus van Rhijn served as the twelfth Archbishop of Utrecht from 1797 to 1808.

== Early Ministry ==
Before serving as Archbishop of Utrecht, van Rhijn served as a parish priest in Utrecht.

== Archbishop of Utrecht ==
Following the death of Walter van Nieuwenhuisen, Archbishop of Utrecht, on Good Friday, 14 April 1797, van Rhijn was consecrated Archbishop of Utrecht by Bishop Adrianus Johannes Broekman of Haarlem and Bishop Nicolas Nellemans of Deventer. He was subsequently excommunicated for the act by the Roman Catholic Church.

== Death ==
C.B. Moss suggests that, perhaps linked to the fact that “Napoleon, who was now the real ruler of the Netherlands, [and] was determined to put an end to the independence of the Church of Utrecht,” van Rhijn died suddenly on 24 June 1808. Neale suggests that van Rhijn was poisoned.

Catholic Church titles
Preceded by Walter van Nieuwenhuisen; 1768-1797	Old Catholic Archbishop of Utrecht; 1797-1808	Succeeded by Willibrord van Os; 1814-1825
