= Old Catholic Archdiocese of Utrecht =

Archdiocese within the Old Catholic Church of the Netherlands

Coordinates: 52.0889°N 5.1167°E

Archdiocese of Utrecht Aartsbisdom Utrecht (Oud-Katholieke Kerk)
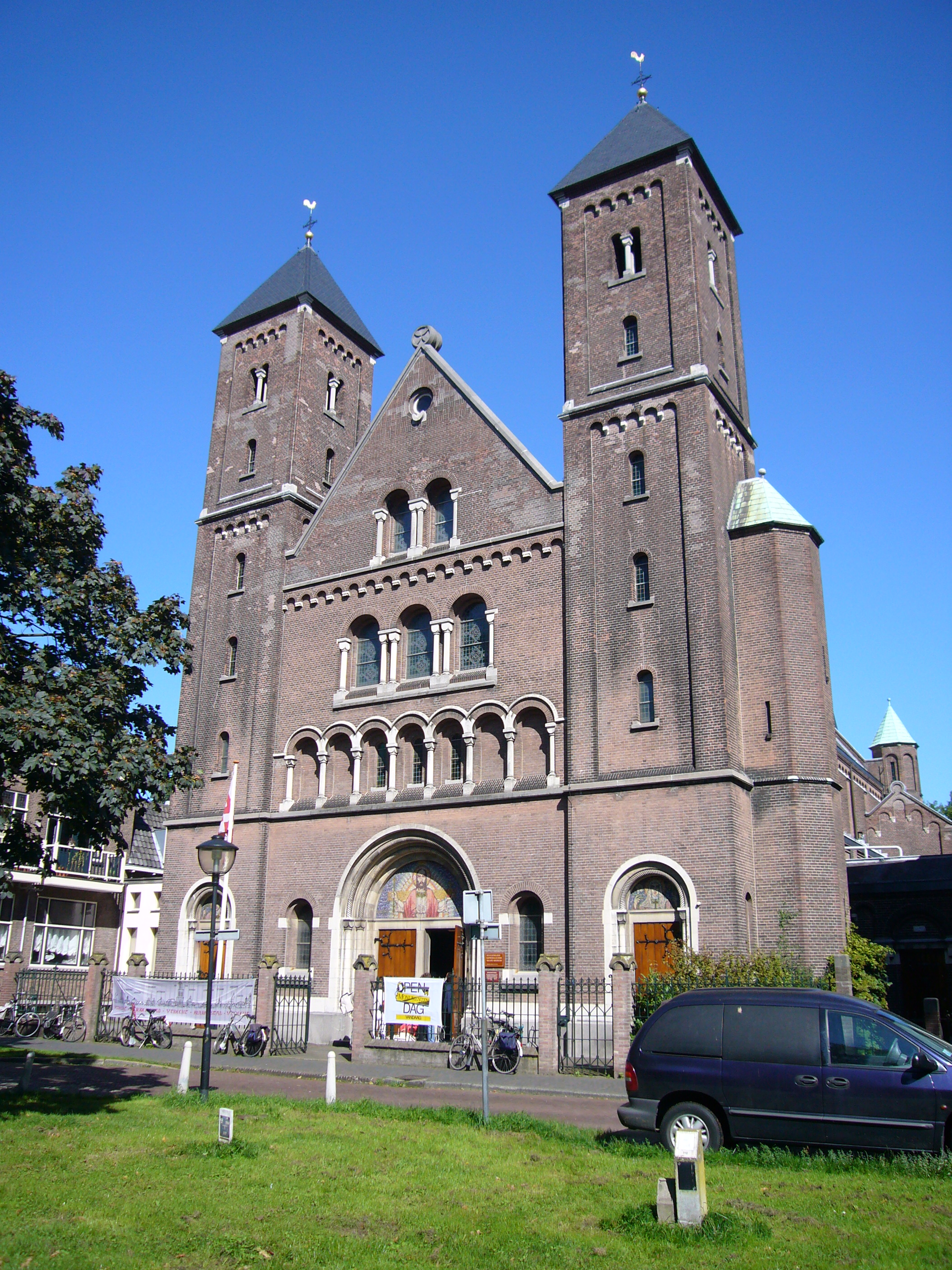
- St. Gertrude's Cathedral, Utrecht

Location
- Country: Netherlands
- Headquarters: St. Gertrude's Cathedral, Utrecht

Information
- Denomination: Old Catholic Church of the Netherlands
- Established: 1723
- Cathedral: St. Gertrude's Cathedral

Current leadership
- Archbishop: Bernd Wallet

Website
- utrecht.okkn.nl

The Old Catholic Archdiocese of Utrecht is an archdiocese within the Old Catholic Church of the Netherlands which split from the Archdiocese of Utrecht officially in 1723 because of the illicit consecration of Cornelius van Steenoven to the episcopate.

The first Old Catholic archbishop of Utrecht was elected in 1723. The Old Catholic archbishop of Utrecht is automatically the president of the International Old Catholic Bishops' Conference of the Union of Utrecht.

Since 2020, its archbishop is Bernd Wallet.

== List of bishops ==
Below is the list of bishops of the modern Old Catholic Archdiocese of Utrecht. For the lineage of former bishops before 1710, see List of Apostolic Vicars in Utrecht of the Dutch Mission.

- Cornelius van Steenoven (1723–1725)
- Cornelius Johannes Barchman Wuytiers (1725–1733)
- Theodorus van der Croon (1734–1739)
- Petrus Johannes Meindaerts (1739–1767)
- Walter van Nieuwenhuisen (1768–1797)
- Johannes Jacobus van Rhijn (1797–1808)
- Willibrord van Os (1814–1825)
- Johannes van Santen (1825–1858)
- Henricus Loos (1858–1873)
- Johannes Heijkamp (1875–1892)
- Gerardus Gul (1892–1920)
- Franciscus Kenninck (1920–1937)
- Andreas Rinkel (1937–1970)
- Marinus Kok (1970–1982)
- Antonius Jan Glazemaker (1982–2000)
- Joris Vercammen (2000–2020)
- Bernd Wallet (2020-present)

== See also ==
- Episcopal principality of Utrecht
- Holland (Batavia) Mission
- Lordship of Utrecht
