= International Old Catholic Bishops' Conference =

Assembly of Old Catholic Bishops

- Internationale Altkatholische Bischofskonferenz
- Abbreviation: IBC
- Formation: September 24, 1889; 137 years ago
- Founded at: Utrecht, Netherlands
- Headquarters: Utrecht, Netherlands
- Region served: Europe
- President: Archbishop Bernd Wallet
- Main organ: Conference
- Parent organization: Union of Utrecht of the Old Catholic Churches

The International Old Catholic Bishops' Conference or simply International Bishops' Conference (IBC) is the synod of bishops of Union of Utrecht of the Old Catholic Churches (UU) member churches.

== Background ==
The International Old Catholic Bishops' Conference was founded in 1889 by the bishops of the Old Catholic Church of the Netherlands, the Catholic Diocese of the Old Catholics in Germany, and the Christian Catholic Church of Switzerland. It is analogous to but not a metropolia. It is similar to the Lambeth Conference of the Anglican Communion. Like the Lambeth Conference, it is not a legislative body.

According to the UU, the responsibilities of the IBC include:

- maintaining community between member churches of the UU
- "tak[ing] a stand in controversial questions of faith and related ethical behaviours as well as in church order"
- making formal authoritative UU statements about faith and principles
- regulating ecumenical "relationships with other churches and religious communities"
- accepting churches into the UU
- accepting bishops into the IBC

The archbishop of the Old Catholic Archdiocese of Utrecht is ex officio president of the IBC.

The bishops of UU member churches meet yearly.
