= Old Catholic Church of the Netherlands =

Old Catholic group in the Netherlands

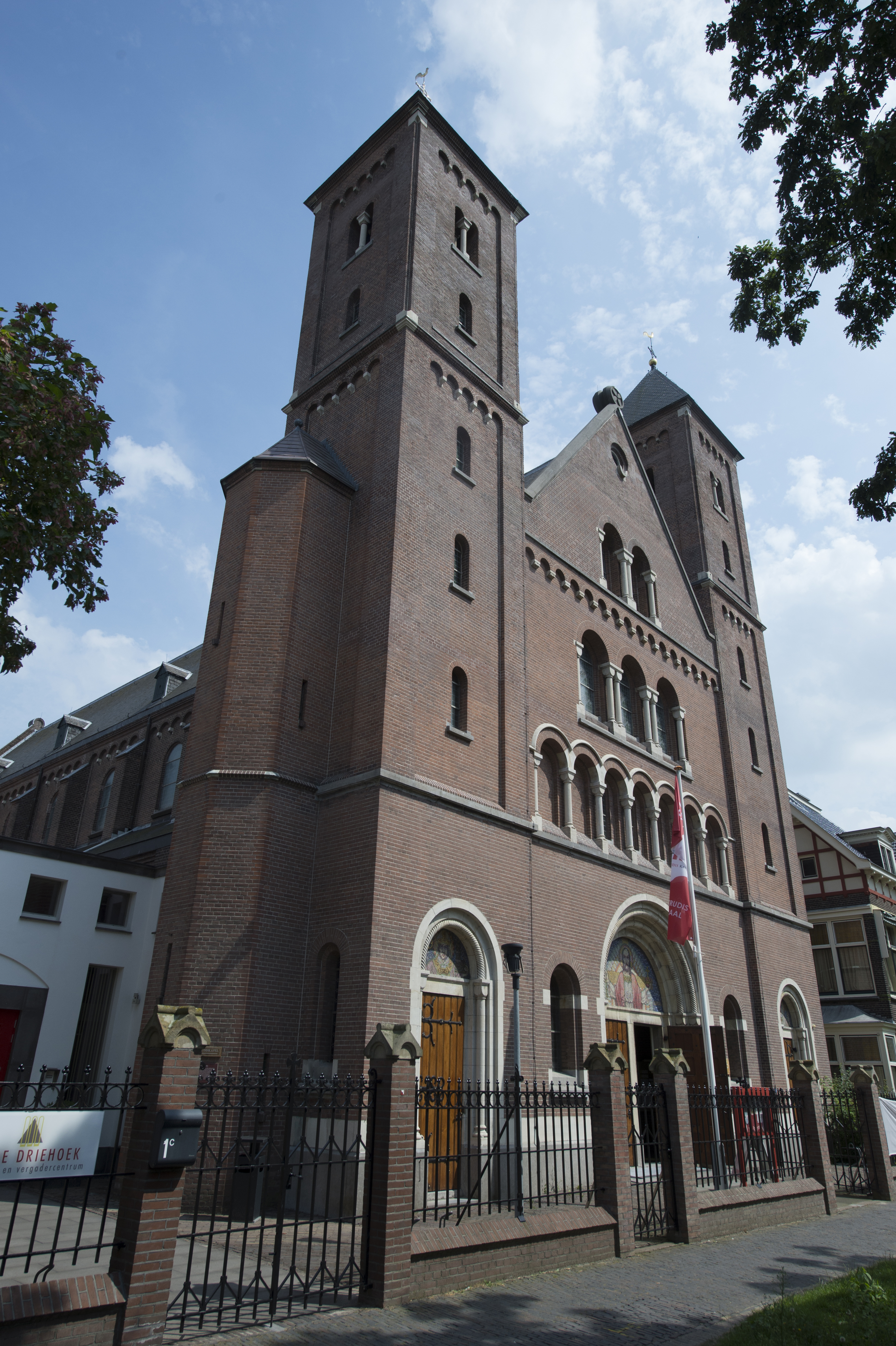
- St. Gertrude's Cathedral, Utrecht
- Classification: Old Catholic
- Theology: Ultrajectine
- Polity: Episcopal
- Archbishop metropolitan: Bernd Wallet
- Associations: International Old Catholic Bishops' Conference; Union of Utrecht
- Full communion: Anglican Communion; Church of Sweden; Philippine Independent Church; Mar Thoma Syrian Church
- Region: Netherlands
- Headquarters: Utrecht
- Separated from: Catholic Church
- Other names: Ancient Catholic Church; Church of Utrecht; Dutch Roman Catholic Church of the Old Episcopal Order

The Old Catholic Church of the Netherlands (Dutch: Oud-Katholieke Kerk van Nederland), sometimes Jansenist Church of Holland, is an Old Catholic jurisdiction originating from the Archdiocese of Utrecht (695–1580). The Old Catholic Church of the Netherlands is the mother church of the Old Catholic Union of Utrecht.

With membership of 10,000 members as reported to the World Council of Churches for 2024, the jurisdiction is currently led by Archbishop Metropolitan Bernd Wallet.

== History ==
=== Early history ===
St. Willibrord evangelised the northern parts of the Netherlands (above the Rhine), bringing Roman Catholicism in the 7th century. The southern parts of the now so-called Benelux were already evangelised from the 4th century, beginning with St. Servatius, Bishop of Maastricht. Willibrord had been consecrated by Pope Sergius I in circa 696 in Rome.

In 1145, Pope Eugene III restricted the electorate to the chapters of the five collegiate churches in the diocese. (Note: Elections prior to Heribert, election of bishops in the diocese was by popular vote and included laity in the electorate.) The Fourth Lateran Council confirmed this in 1215. In 1517, Pope Leo X prohibited, in Debitum pastoralis officii nobis, the Archbishop-Elector of Cologne, Hermann of Wied, as legatus natus, (Note: "As papal power increased after the middle of the eleventh century these legates came to have less and less real authority and eventually the legatus natus was hardly more than a title.") to summon to a court of first instance in Cologne, Philip of Burgundy, his treasurer, and his ecclesiastical and secular subjects. (Note: Joosting and Muller noted that Leo X also promulgated another bull, in which he commissioned that the Bishop of Utrecht, his treasurer and his subjects informed that they were empowered to disregard privileges formerly granted to others and to prosecute offenders while setting aside formerly specified legal process.) John Mason Neale explained that Leo X only confirmed a right of the church but Leo X's confirmation "was providential" in respect to the future schism.

=== Reformation and Jansenism ===
Forced into hiding as a result of the Protestant Reformation, the diocesan structures of the Catholic Church of the Netherlands were dissolved. (Note: The Archdiocese of Utrecht (695–1580) was suppressed in 1580.) The Holland Mission started when Pope Clement VIII erected the Apostolic Vicariate of Batavia in 1592.

The Jesuits accused Archbishop Petrus Codde, apostolic vicar, of Jansenism. Pope Innocent XII appointed a commission of cardinals who started an investigation of Codde, ending in exoneration. In 1700, Codde was summoned to Rome and brought before a second commission appointed by Pope Clement XI. When Codde refused assent to the Formula of Submission for the Jansenists, Clement XI suspended Codde in 1701 and appointed a successor, Gerard Potcamp, as apostolic vicar.

Although the historic archdiocese was suppressed in 1580, and its replacement, the apostolic vicariate, was erected in 1592, the chapter of the suppressed archdiocese arranged for Luke Fagan, Bishop of Meath, to ordain priests for the suppressed archdiocese in 1716.

Finally in 1723, dissatisfied Dutch clergy elected Cornelius Steenoven as archbishop of the suppressed Archdiocese of Utrecht. He was consecrated in 1724 without a papal mandate by suspended Bishop Dominique Marie Varlet, who had been living in Amsterdam since 1721. (Note: Varlet was suspended and removed from office in 1719 for administering the Sacrament of Confirmation in 1718 outside of his jurisdiction while travelling through Amsterdam.) Both Varlet and Steenoven were suspended for illicit episcopal consecration, and excommunicated for claiming a diocesan see of jurisdiction without the permission of the Roman Pontiff. Varlet later reconciled with the Catholic Church, but subsequently consecrated, again without a papal mandate, three more bishops for the independent Ultrajectine church, which would later become known as "Old Catholic" after 1853. Among the three bishops was Petrus Johannes Meindaerts who consecrated several other bishops, becoming the source of apostolic succession for all Old Catholic bishops, after he was consecrated by Varlet in 1739 which had no papal mandate.

The apostolic vicariate was reduced to a mission sui iuris by Pope Benedict XIII in 1727.

In 1853, under the reestablished episcopal hierarchy in the Netherlands, Catholics were permitted to worship publicly after two and a half centuries of secret and private religious worship. After reestablishment of the episcopal hierarchy in the Netherlands in 1853 by Pope Pius IX, the breakaway Church of Utrecht adopted the name "Old Catholic Church" to distinguish itself from the newly created Roman hierarchy by its seniority in the Netherlands.

=== Vatican I ===
In 1870 the First Vatican Council was convened, and the bishops of the Church of Utrecht were not invited because they were not seen as being in communion with the Holy See. At the First Vatican Council, papal supremacy in jurisdiction and the Catholic dogma of papal infallibility were defined.

Several separate communities were formed at this time and sought apostolic succession from the Old Catholic Archbishop of Utrecht, eventually forming the Union of Utrecht of the Old Catholic Churches, and these German speaking communities adopted the name Old Catholic. The schism was able to continue.

== Doctrine ==
Old Catholics believe they preserve ancient Catholic doctrine through adherence to the "ancient Catholic faith". Their practice of private confession has fallen into disuse in most areas. Since 1878, Old Catholic clergy have been allowed to marry at any time. It would also seem that, by the beginning of the 20th century, the Eucharistic fast had been abandoned, along with practice of Eucharistic Adoration, and the veneration of the saints.

== Old Catholic Archbishops of Utrecht ==
The Metropolitan Archbishop of Utrecht (not to be confused with the Catholic prelate who holds the same title) is the leader of the Old Catholic Church of the Netherlands, and chairman of its governing bodies.

The current archbishop is Bernd Wallet.

- Cornelius van Steenoven (1723–1725)
- Cornelius Johannes Barchman Wuytiers (1725–1733)
- Theodorus van der Croon (1734–1739)
- Petrus Johannes Meindaerts (1739–1767)
- Walter van Nieuwenhuisen (1768–1797)
- Johannes Jacobus van Rhijn (1797–1808)
- Willibrord van Os (1814–1825)
- Johannes van Santen (1825–1858)
- Henricus Loos (1858–1873)
- Johannes Heijkamp (1875–1892)
- Gerardus Gul (1892–1920)
- Franciscus Kenninck (1920–1937)
- Andreas Rinkel (1937–1970)
- Marinus Kok (1970–1982)
- Antonius Jan Glazemaker (1982–2000)
- Joris Vercammen (2000–2020)
- Bernd Wallet (2020–present)

== Old Catholic Bishops of Deventer ==
- Antonius Jan Glazemaker (1979–1982)
