= Old Catholic Church =

Major Christian denomination

- Polity: Episcopal
- Union of Utrecht: Old Catholic Church of the Netherlands; Old Catholic Church in Sweden and Denmark; Polish-Catholic Church in the Republic of Poland (Note: The organization Polish Catholic Church in Poland, a member church of the UU, is not to be confused with the Catholic Church in Poland or confused with the Polish National Catholic Church, a former member church of the UU.); Catholic Diocese of the Old Catholics in Germany; Christian Catholic Church of Switzerland; Old Catholic Mission in France; Old Catholic Church of Austria; Old Catholic Church of Croatia; Old Catholic Church of the Czech Republic
- Union of Scranton: Polish National Catholic Church; Nordic Catholic Church; Old Catholic Church in Italy (NCC-COI)
- Associations: World Council of Churches (Union of Utrecht only)
- Full communion: Anglican Communion (Union of Utrecht only); Church of Sweden (Union of Utrecht only); Philippine Independent Church (Union of Utrecht only)
- Separated from: Catholic Church
- Also known as Old Catholics or Old-Catholic churches

The Old Catholic Church, Old Catholics, Old-Catholic churches, or Old Catholic movement are "any of the groups of Western Christians who believe themselves to maintain in complete loyalty the doctrine and traditions of the undivided church but who separated from the See of Rome after the First Vatican Council of 1869–70".

The expression "Old Catholic" has been used from the 1850s by communions separated from the Roman Catholic Church over certain doctrines, primarily concerned with papal authority and infallibility. Some of these groups, especially in the Netherlands, had already existed long before the term. The Old Catholic Church is separate and distinct from Traditionalist Catholicism.

Two groups of Old Catholic churches are: the Union of Utrecht (UU, not to be confused with Unitarian Universalism) and the Union of Scranton (US). Neither group is in full communion with the Holy See. Member churches of the Union of Utrecht are in full communion with the Anglican Communion as well as the Evangelical Lutheran Church of Sweden and the Philippine Independent Church and many UU churches are members of the World Council of Churches. Other churches which claim to be Old Catholic yet are not members of the Union of Utrecht or Union of Scranton are Independent Old Catholics; within the independent sacramental movement, Independent Old Catholics do not consider recognition by Utrecht as a necessary litmus test.

Both mainstream groups trace their beginning to the 18th century when members of the See of Utrecht refused to obey papal authority and were excommunicated. Later Catholics who disagreed with the Catholic dogma of papal infallibility, as defined by the First Vatican Council (1870), were thereafter without a bishop and joined with the See of Utrecht to form the Union of Utrecht of the Old Catholic Churches. Today, Utrechter Union churches are found chiefly in Germany, Switzerland, the Netherlands, Austria, Poland, and the Czech Republic.

In 2008, the Polish National Catholic Church created the Union of Scranton and separated from the Union of Utrecht. This was done in protest of the older union's decision to ordain women and bless same-sex marriages. The Nordic Catholic Church later joined the Union of Scranton as well.

In 2020, according to the World Christian Database and World Christian Encyclopedia, published by Edinburgh University Press, there were 4,896,000 Old Catholics worldwide, altogether.

== History ==
=== Pre-Reformation diocese and archdiocese of Utrecht ===
In the pre-Reformation era, there were already disputes that set the stage for an independent bishopric of Utrecht between the Catholic Church and the Holy Roman Empire, notably from the 11th to the 15th century.

=== Post-Reformation Netherlands ===
The northern provinces that revolted against the Spanish Netherlands and signed the 1579 Union of Utrecht, persecuted the Catholic Church, confiscated church property, expelled monks and nuns from convents and monasteries, and made it illegal to receive the Catholic sacraments. As a result, priests and communities went underground. Groups would meet for the sacraments in the attics of private homes at the risk of arrest. Priests identified themselves by wearing all black clothing with very simple collars.

All the episcopal sees of the area, including that of Utrecht, had fallen vacant by 1580, because the Spanish crown, which since 1559 had patronal rights over all bishoprics in the Netherlands, refused to make appointments for what it saw as heretical territories, and the nomination of an apostolic vicar was seen as a way of avoiding direct violation of the privilege granted to the crown. The appointment of an apostolic vicar, the first after many centuries, for what came to be called the Holland Mission was followed by similar appointments for other Protestant-ruled countries, such as England, which likewise became mission territories. The disarray of the Catholic Church in the Netherlands between 1572 and about 1610 was followed by a period of expansion of Catholicism under the apostolic vicars, leading to Protestant protests.

The initial shortage of Catholic priests in the Netherlands resulted in increased pastoral activity of religious clergy, among whom Jesuits formed a considerable minority, coming to represent between 10 and 15 percent of all the Dutch clergy in the 1600–1650 period. Conflicts arose between these, and the apostolic vicars and secular clergy. In 1629, there were 321 Catholic priests in the United Provinces, 250 secular and 71 religious, with Jesuits at 34 forming almost half of the religious. By the middle of the 17th century, the secular priests were 442, the religious 142, of whom 62 were Jesuits.

The sixth apostolic vicar of the Dutch/Holland Mission, Petrus Codde, was appointed in 1688. In 1691, the Jesuits accused him of favouring the Jansenist heresy. Pope Innocent XII appointed a commission of cardinals to investigate the accusations against Codde. The commission concluded that the accusations were groundless. In 1702, Pope Clement XI deposed Codde, to which Codde obeyed.

While the religious clergy remained loyal to the Holy See, three-quarters of the secular clergy at first followed Codde, but by 1706 over two-thirds of these returned to Catholic allegiance. Of the laity, the overwhelming majority sided with the Holy See. Thus, most Dutch Catholics remained in full communion with the pope and with the apostolic vicars appointed by him.

After Codde's resignation, the Diocese of Utrecht elected Cornelius Steenoven as bishop. The See of Utrecht declared the right to elect its own archbishop in 1724, after being accused of Jansenism. Following consultation with both canon lawyers and theologians in France and Germany, Dominique Marie Varlet, a Catholic bishop of the French Oratorian Society of Foreign Missions, consecrated Steenoven as a bishop without a papal mandate. What had been de jure autonomous became de facto an independent Catholic church. Although the pope was notified of all proceedings, the Holy See still regarded the diocese as vacant due to papal permission not being sought. The pope, therefore, continued to appoint apostolic vicars for the Netherlands. Steenoven and the other bishops were excommunicated by the Catholic Church, and thus began the Old Catholic Church in the Netherlands. Subsequent bishops were then appointed and ordained to the sees of Deventer, Haarlem and Groningen under the See of Utrecht in later years.

Due to prevailing anti-papal feeling among the powerful Dutch Calvinists, the Church of Utrecht was tolerated and even praised by the government of the Dutch Republic.

In 1853 Pope Pius IX received guarantees of religious freedom from King William II of the Netherlands and re-established the Catholic hierarchy in the Netherlands. The Holy See considers the Archdiocese of Utrecht as the continuation of the episcopal see founded in the 7th century and raised to metropolitan status on 12 May 1559, thus not recognizing any legitimacy of Old Catholics.

=== First Vatican Council, Old Catholic Union of Utrecht ===
After the First Vatican Council (1869–1870), several groups of Catholics in Austria-Hungary, Imperial Germany, and Switzerland rejected the Catholic dogma of papal infallibility in matters of faith and morals and left to form their own churches. The formation of the Old Catholic communion of Germans, Austrians and Swiss began under the leadership of Ignaz von Döllinger, following the First Vatican Council. These were supported by the Old Catholic Archbishop of Utrecht, who ordained priests and bishops for them. Later the Dutch were united more formally with many of these groups under the name "Utrecht Union of Churches".

In the spring of 1871, a convention in Munich attracted several hundred participants, including Church of England and Protestant observers. Döllinger, an excommunicated Catholic priest and church historian, was a notable leader of the movement but was never a member of an Old Catholic church.

The convention decided to form the "Old Catholic Church" in order to distinguish its members from what they saw as the novel teaching in the Catholic dogma of papal infallibility. Although it had continued to use the Roman Rite, from the middle of the 18th century the Dutch Old Catholic See of Utrecht had increasingly used the vernacular instead of Latin. The churches which broke from the Holy See in 1870 and subsequently entered into union with the Old Catholic See of Utrecht gradually introduced the vernacular into the liturgy until it completely replaced Latin in 1877. In 1874, the Old Catholics removed the requirement of clerical celibacy.

The Catholic Diocese of the Old Catholics in Germany received support from the government of Otto von Bismarck, whose 1870s Kulturkampf policies persecuted the Catholic Church. In Austria-Hungary, pan-Germanic nationalist groups, like those of Georg Ritter von Schönerer, promoted the conversion of all German speaking Catholics to Old Catholicism and Lutheranism, with poor results.

=== Spread of Old Catholicism throughout the world ===
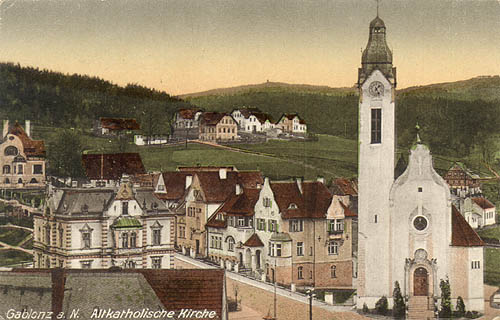
Old Catholic parish church in Gablonz an der Neiße, Austria-Hungary (now Jablonec nad Nisou, Czech Republic). Some ethnic German Catholics supported Döllinger in his rejection of the Roman Catholic dogma of papal infallibility.

In 1897 a group of Polish migrants in the United States broke away from the Holy See due to theological and liturgical issues; their leader, Franciszek Hodur, was consecrated a bishop by Old Catholic Archbishop of Utrecht Gerardus Gul, establishing the Polish National Catholic Church, which joined the Union of Utrecht.

==== Split of Old Roman Catholics and Liberal Catholics ====
In 1910, Arnold Mathew—a former British Catholic and Anglican, who was consecrated by Old Catholic Archbishop Gul in 1908—split away from the Union of Utrecht, establishing the Old Roman Catholic Church in Great Britain. In 1914, he consecrated Rudolph de Landas Berghes, who emigrated to the United States in 1914 and planted the seed of Old Roman Catholicism in the Americas. Mathew also consecrated an excommunicated Capuchin Franciscan priest as bishop: Carmel Henry Carfora. Various Christian denominations claiming apostolic succession from Mathew were founded in the world through Berghes, Carfora, and others including James Wedgwood—founder of the Liberal Catholic Church. Such groups' apostolic succession is deemed to be invalid by both the Holy See, the Union of Utrecht and the Anglican Communion. Mathew himself was excommunicated and declared a "pseudo-bishop" by Pope Pius X, while the International Old Catholic Bishops' Conference—after his death—declared his consecration to be null and void, obtained mala fide. Previously, the Utrechter Old Catholics considered his episcopacy regular whilst distancing themselves after his separation from them.

Another significant figure, Joseph René Vilatte, who was ordained a deacon and priest by Bishop Eduard Herzog, of the Christian Catholic Church of Switzerland; he worked with Catholics of Belgian ancestry living on the Door Peninsula of Wisconsin, with the knowledge and blessing of the Union of Utrecht and under the full jurisdiction of the local Episcopal Bishop of Fond du Lac, Wisconsin. However, he subsequently left the Old Catholics and was later consecrated a bishop by Patriarch Mar Julius I of the Malankara Orthodox Syrian Church, though the validity of such consecration was disputed. He proceeded to establish a number of Christian denominations before eventually reconciling with the Holy See.

=== Polish National Catholic schism from Utrecht ===
In 2003, the Polish National Catholic Church voted itself out of the UU due to the Utrechter Union's acceptance of female ordination, and their attitude towards same-sex marriage, both of which the Polish National Catholic Church rejects. Prior, in 1994, the German Old Catholic bishops of the Utrechter Union decided to ordain women as priests, and put this into practice on 27 May 1996. Similar decisions and practices followed in Austria, Switzerland and the Netherlands. The Christian Catholic Church of Switzerland approved in June 2022 the introduction of the sacrament of same-sex marriage starting in July 2022, joining the churches of Germany and the Netherlands.

=== Old Catholic Church of Slovakia ===
The Old Catholic Church of Slovakia was accepted in 2000 as a member of the Union of Utrecht. As early as 2001 some issues arose concerning the future consecration of Augustín Bačinský as the Old Catholic bishop of Slovakia, and the matter was postponed. The Old Catholic Church of Slovakia was expelled from the Union of Utrecht in 2004, because the episcopal administrator Bačinský had been consecrated by an episcopus vagans. In the words of the Old Catholic Church of Slovakia itself, the church left the Union of Utrecht of their own volition due to the Union's approval of female ordination and same-sex marriage. Unlike other Old Catholic churches that disapproved of this, they have not become members of the Union of Scranton.

=== Independent Old Catholicism in the Americas ===
At present, the only recognized Christian church in North America that is in communion with the Union of Utrecht is the Episcopal Church. Since the Polish National Catholic Church schismed with the Utrechter Old Catholics, the two Old Catholic unions do not recognize each other. Christians claiming to be Old Catholic outside of both the Union of Utrecht and Union of Scranton are referred to as Independent Old Catholics; according to Robert Caruso in The Old Catholic Church:

The history of the independent Old Catholic movement in the U.S. is highly disordered, partially because so many fragmented entities have erroneously adopted the term "Old Catholic," e.g., the Old Roman Catholic Church, the Liberal Catholic Church, the churches established by Bishop Vilatte and Bishop Mathew, and so on. This problem developed when more and more self-labeled independent Catholic bishops began falsely claiming to be part of the Old Catholic Church. These wandering bishops (as they are labeled by Utrecht and the Anglican churches) were, in a manner of speaking, altogether of another ecclesial origin apart from the Old Catholic churches of the Union of Utrecht.

The Independent Old Catholics constitute the independent sacramental movement. One Independent Catholic apologist noted that recognition by Utrecht would be unnecessary. He stated:

Given this history, the modern tendency—especially in some continental circles—to look down upon the Independent Sacramental Movement (ISM) is historically ironic. When Utrecht critiques the ISM for: irregular origins, bishops emerging from unconventional circumstances, or ecclesial creativity outside mainstream structures, it critiques precisely the conditions from which Utrecht itself was reborn. The Old Catholic Church of Utrecht owes its episcopate to a suspended missionary bishop whose formative experiences were shaped in the New World and who acted out of conscience, pastoral concern, and a conviction that God’s grace supersedes canon law when the good of the Church requires it. That is not an Old Catholic embarrassment. That is the Old Catholic story.

== Statistics ==
According to the World Christian Database and World Christian Encyclopedia, published by Edinburgh University Press, there were 4,896,000 Old Catholics worldwide, altogether in 2020. These statistics included the Utrechter, Scranton, and Independent Old Catholics.

=== Utrecht ===
As of 2016, there were 115,000 members of Old Catholic churches aligned with Utrecht.

Church	Membership
Catholic Diocese of the Old-Catholics in Germany	15,500
Old Catholic Church of Austria	14,621
Old Catholic Church of the Netherlands	10,000
Christian Catholic Church of Switzerland	13,500
Old Catholic Mariavite Church in Poland	29,000
Polish Catholic Church in Poland (Note: Polish Catholic Church in Poland, a member church of the UU, is not to be confused with the Catholic Church in Poland or confused with the PNCC, a former member church of the UU.)	20,000

=== Scranton ===
As of 2008, there were more than 60,000 members of Old Catholic churches aligned with Scranton.

Church	Membership
Polish National Catholic Church	60,000
Nordic Catholic Church	Undetermined

== Beliefs ==
Old Catholic theology views the Eucharist as the core of the Christian Church; from this point of view, the church is a community of believers. All are in communion with one another around the sacrifice of Jesus Christ, as the highest expression of the love of God. Therefore, the celebration of the Eucharist is understood as the experience of Christ's triumph over sin. The defeat of sin consists in bringing together that which is divided.

An active contributor to the Declaration of the Catholic Congress of Munich, 1871—and all later assemblies—was Johann Friedrich von Schulte, professor of dogmatics at Prague. Von Schulte summed up the results of the congress as follows:

- adherence to the ancient Catholic faith;
- maintenance of the rights of Catholics;
- rejection of new Catholic dogmas;
- adherence to the constitutions of the ancient Church with repudiation of every dogma of faith not in harmony with the by-then established conscience of the Church;
- reform of the Church with constitutional participation of the laity;
- preparation of the way for reunion of the Christian confessions;
- reform of the training and position of the clergy;
- adherence to the State against the attacks of Ultramontanism;
- rejection of the Society of Jesus;
- claim to the real property of the Church

The 1889 Declaration of Utrecht states the Union of Utrecht believes in Vincent of Lérins's following quote from his Commonitory: "all possible care must be taken, that we hold that faith which has been believed everywhere, always, by all; for this is truly what is catholic". The UU allows those who are divorced to have a new religious marriage in the church, and Old Catholics had gradually replaced the Latin mass with the vernacular by 1877. In 1989, the Union of Utrecht opposed abortion, but "[u]nusual exceptions should be made in consultation with a priest".

=== Apostolic succession ===
Old Catholicism values apostolic succession by which they mean both the uninterrupted laying on of hands by bishops through time (the historic episcopate), and the continuation of the whole life of the church community by word and sacrament over the years and ages. Old Catholics consider apostolic succession to be the handing on of belief in which the whole Christian Church is involved. In this process the ministry has a special responsibility and task, caring for the continuation in time of the mission of Jesus Christ and his apostles.

According to the principle of ex opere operato, certain ordinations by bishops not in communion with Rome are still recognised as being valid by the Holy See, and the ordinations of and by Old Catholic bishops in the Union of Utrecht churches has never been formally questioned by the Holy See until the more recent ordinations of women as priests.

=== Marriage ===
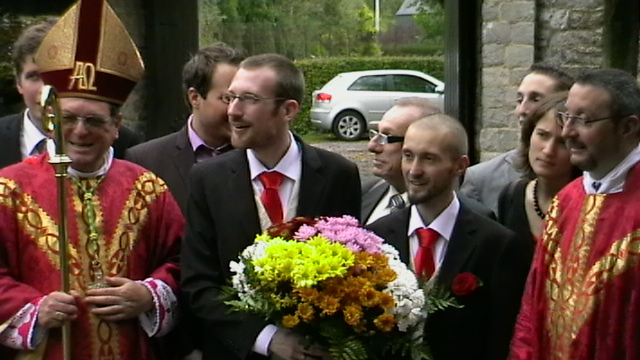
Same-sex wedding in an Old Catholic Church in Belgium.

Some churches support blessings of same-sex marriage. These include the Old Catholic Church of the Netherlands since 2006, the Catholic Diocese of the Old Catholics in Germany since 2021, Christian Catholic Church of Switzerland, and Old Catholic Church of Austria since 2022.

== Ecumenism ==
The Union of Utrecht considers that the reunion of the churches has to be based on a re-actualization of the decisions of faith made by the undivided Church. In that way, they claim, the original unity of the Church could be made visible again. Following these principles, later bishops and theologians of the Union of Utrechts churches stayed in contact with Russian Orthodox, Lutheran and Anglican representatives.

Old Catholic involvement in the multilateral ecumenical movement formally began with the participation of two bishops, from the Netherlands and Switzerland, at the Lausanne Faith and Order (F&O) conference (1927). This side of ecumenism has always remained a major interest for Old Catholics who have never missed an F&O conference. Old Catholics also participate in other activities of the WCC and of national councils of churches. By active participation in the ecumenical movement since its very beginning, the OCC demonstrates its belief in this work.

== See also ==
=== Movements ===
- Independent Catholicism
- Liberal Catholic Church
- Willibrord Society
- German Catholics (sect)

=== People ===
- Franz Heinrich Reusch
- Warren Prall Watters
- Gerard Shelley
- Amalie von Lasaulx
