= Mengelberg =

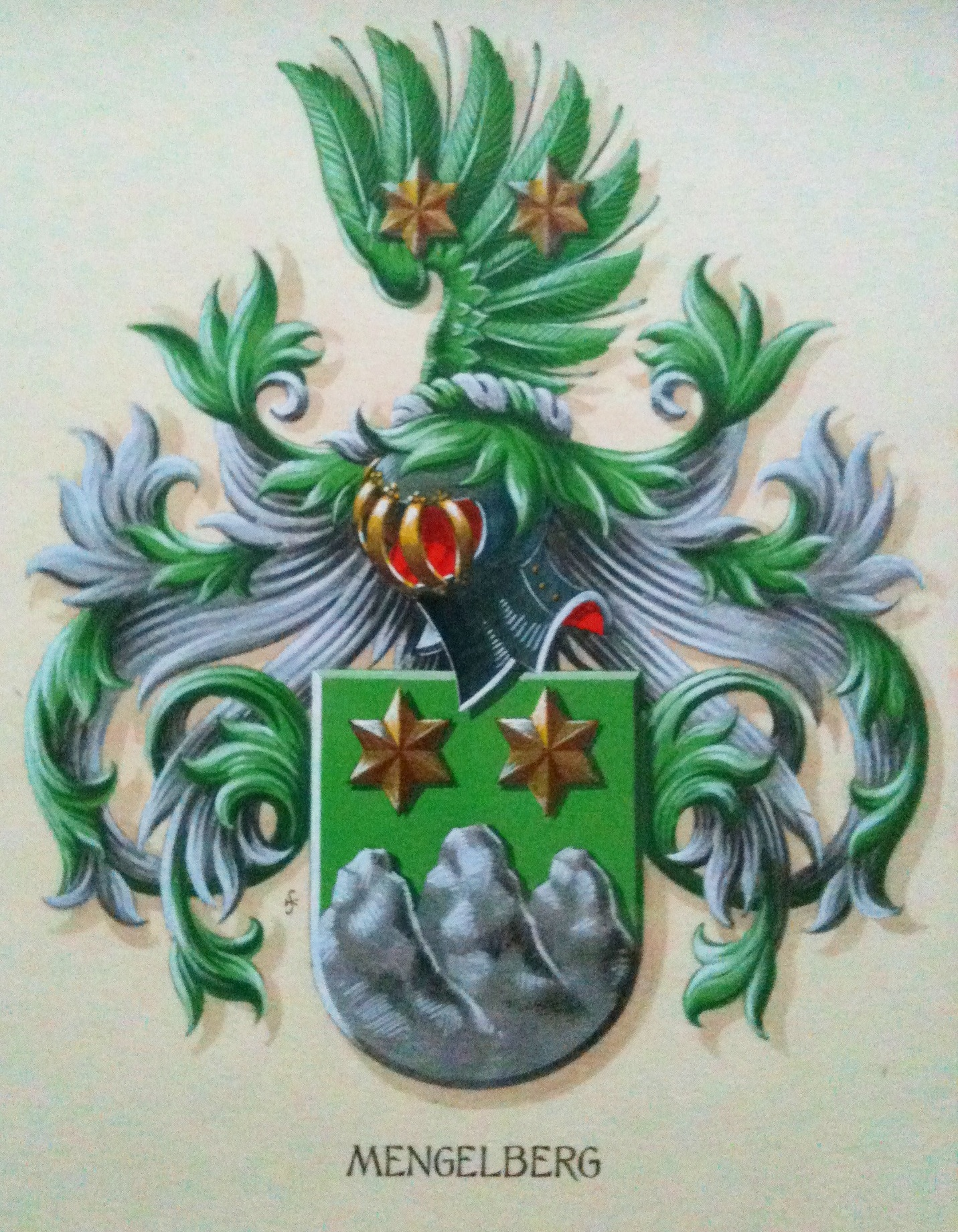
Coat of arms of the Mengelberg family

Mengelberg is a surname. Notable people with the surname include:

- Augustin Mengelberg (1710–1763), abbot of Kloster Heisterbach
- Egidius Mengelberg (1770–1849), German portrait painter
- Friedrich Wilhelm Mengelberg (1837–1919), German-Dutch sculptor, grandson of Egidius Mengelberg
- Heinrich Otto Mengelberg (1841–1891), German sculptor, brother of Friedrich Wilhelm Mengelberg
- Karel Mengelberg (1902–1984), Dutch composer and music writer, nephew of Willem Mengelberg
- Käthe Bauer-Mengelberg (1894–1968), German sociologist, sister of Rudolf Mengelberg
- Misha Mengelberg (1935–2017), Dutch jazz pianist and composer, son of Karel Mengelberg
- Otto Mengelberg (1817–1890), German portrait and historical painter, son of Egidius Mengelberg
- Otto Maria Maximiliaan Mengelberg (1868–1934), Dutch sculptor and stained-glass artist, son of Friedrich Wilhelm Mengelberg
- Rudolf Mengelberg (1892–1959), Dutch composer, musicologist and chief executive of the Concertgebouw Orchestra, nephew of Willem Mengelberg
- Willem Mengelberg (1871–1951), Dutch conductor of the Concertgebouw Orchestra, son of Friedrich Wilhelm Mengelberg
