= De Krijtberg =

Coordinates: 52°22′04″N 4°53′17″E

De Krijtberg Kerk
- Francis Xavier Church "De Krijtberg"
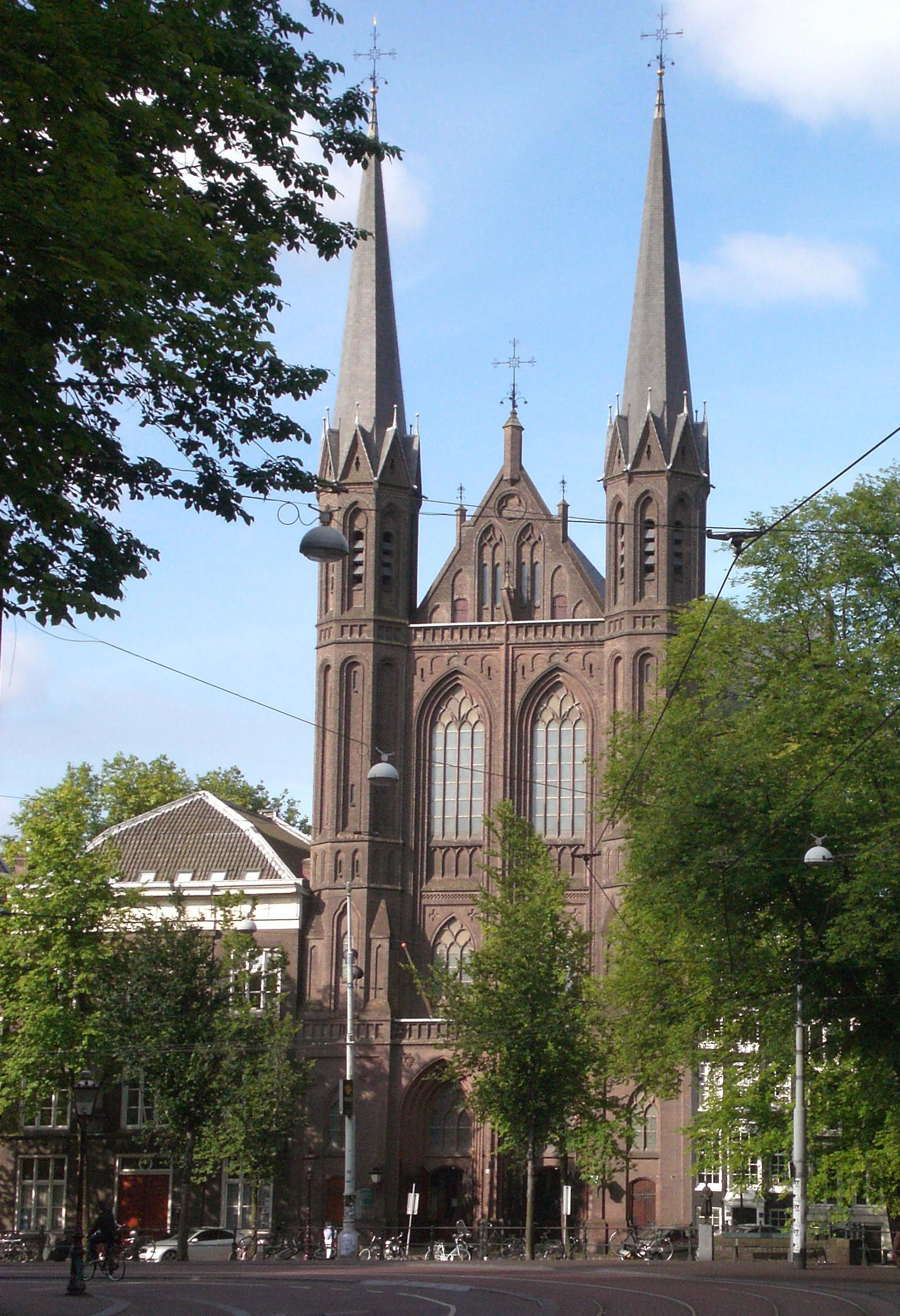
- De Krijtberg Kerk
- Location: Singel 448; 1017 AV Amsterdam
- Country: Netherlands
- Denomination: Roman Catholic
- Website: krijtberg.nl

Architecture
- Architect: Alfred Tepe

Administration
- Diocese: Haarlem-Amsterdam
- Parish: Amsterdam St Nicholas

De Krijtberg Kerk is a Roman Catholic church in Amsterdam, located at the Singel. The church was designed by Alfred Tepe and was opened in 1883. The exuberant interior was made by Friedrich Wilhelm Mengelberg.

== History ==
The church is dedicated to St Francis Xavier and is one of the rectorates within the Roman Catholic parish of St Nicholas, and is recognised by its two pointed towers. Since 1654 there has been a Jesuit church at this location. The original clandestine church was replaced by another one in 1677. The current Neo-Gothic church was built on the same space in 1881. Space limitations led architect Alfred Tepe to design an unusually tall church with a monumental front. The interior was provided by members of the Guild of St. Bernulphus, most notable the Mengelberg firm. Most of interior has survived. Services there are in a variety of styles.

== Ignatius House ==
Next to the church is Ignatius House (Dutch, "Ignatiushuis"). It is a spirituality and cultural centre also of the Society of Jesus. It was founded in 1985 as a non-residential spirituality centre with Paul Begheyn as director. It moved to its present location in 2000. It is dedicated to Ignatius of Loyola, the founder of the Jesuits. It primarily runs courses and retreats on Ignatian spirituality for Dutch speakers. Although, it has Jesuits on the staff, it is run by a team of lay people, members of other Catholic religious orders and other Christian denominations. The building consists of three large rooms, the Great Hall that can fit 50 people in theatre-style seating, an upper room for meetings, lectures, courses and workshops and a meditation room for reflective activities.

== Services ==
- Sunday
  - 10:30 High Mass in Latin
  - 12:30 Eucharist in Dutch
  - 17:15 Eucharist with cantor
- Monday–Friday
  - 12:30 Eucharist in Dutch
- Saturday
  - 12:30 Eucharist in Dutch
  - 17:15 Eucharist in English

== Interior ==
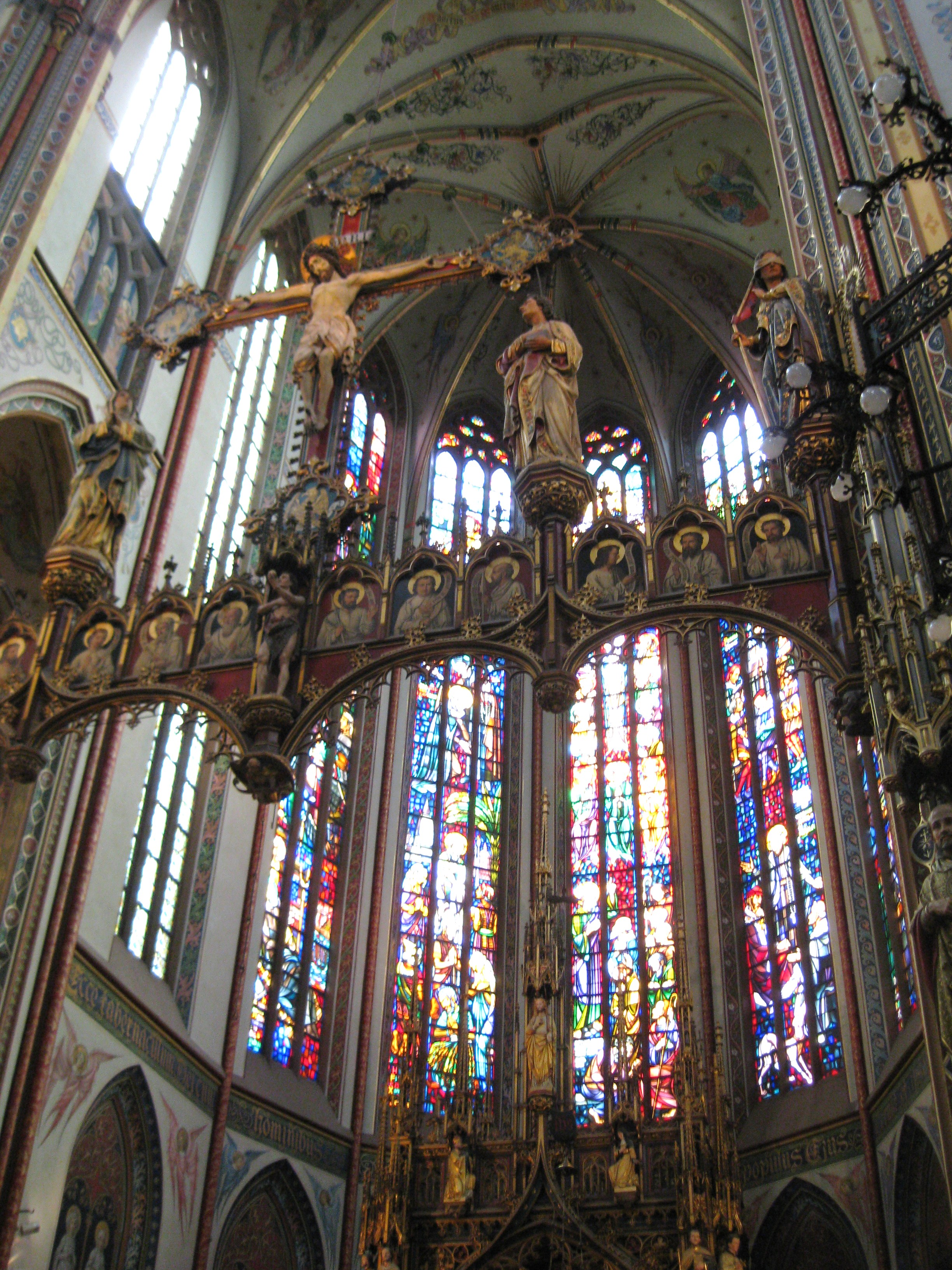
Rood screen

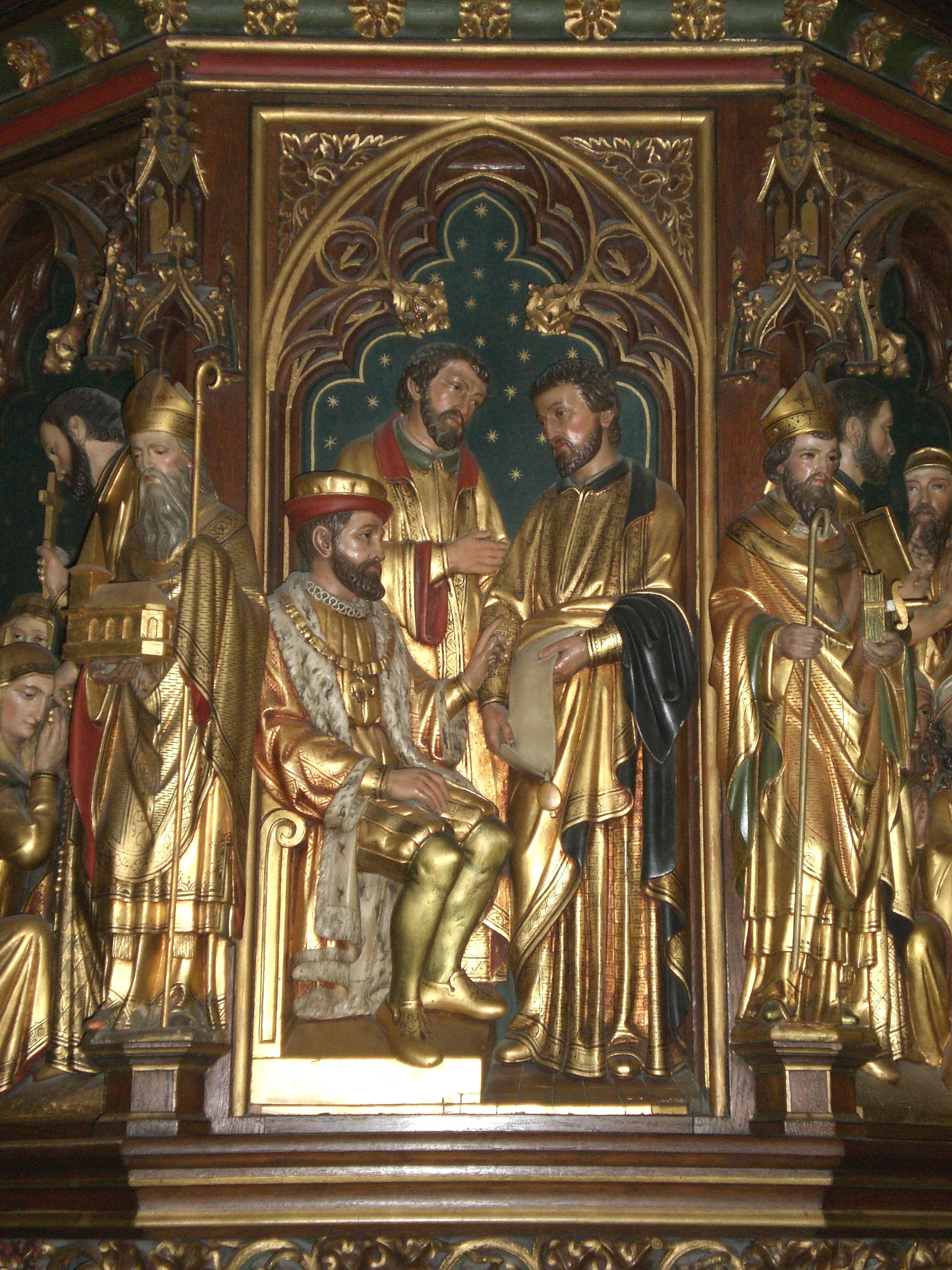
Detail of Ferdinand of Austria receiving Peter Canisius

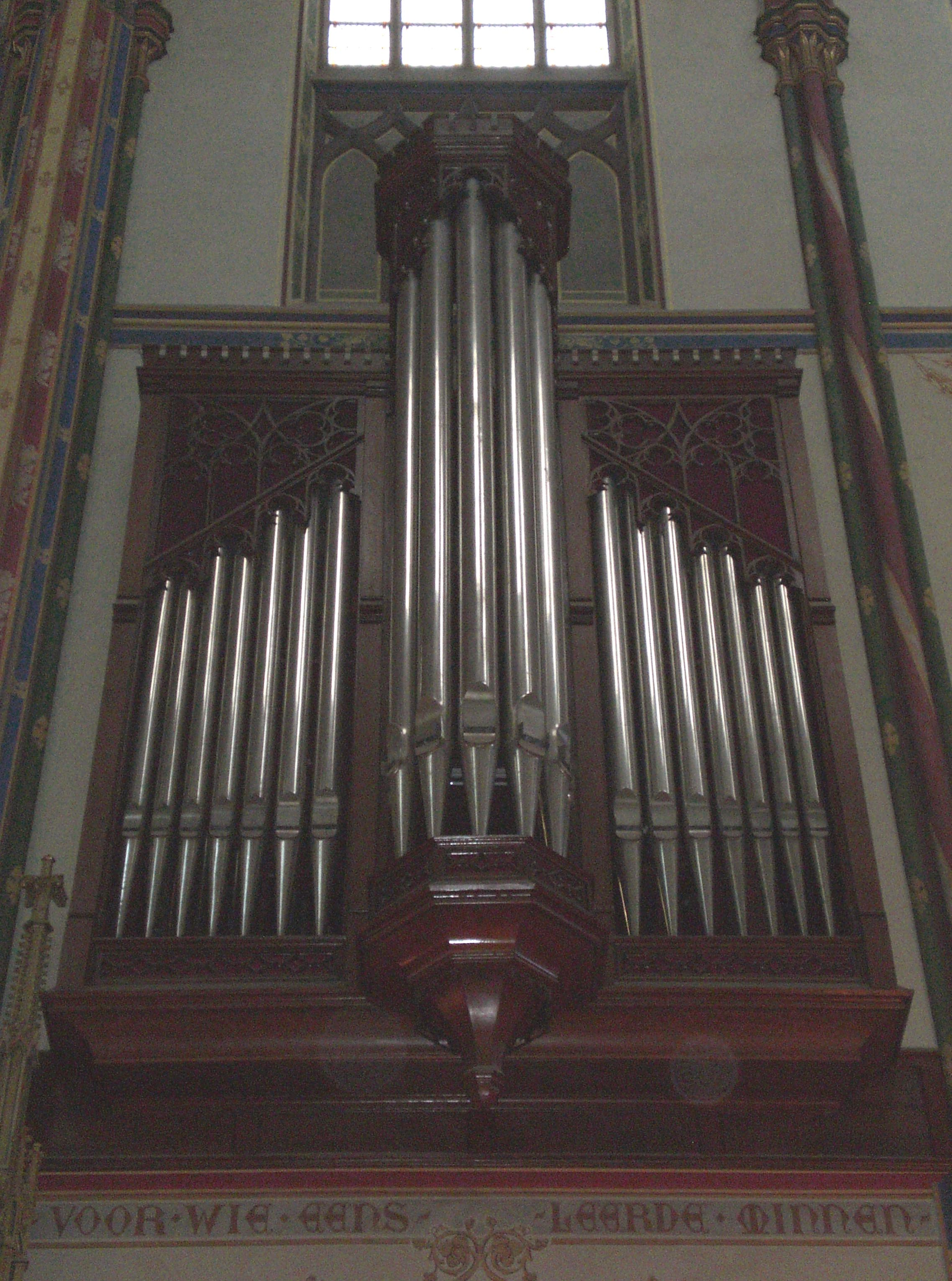
The organ

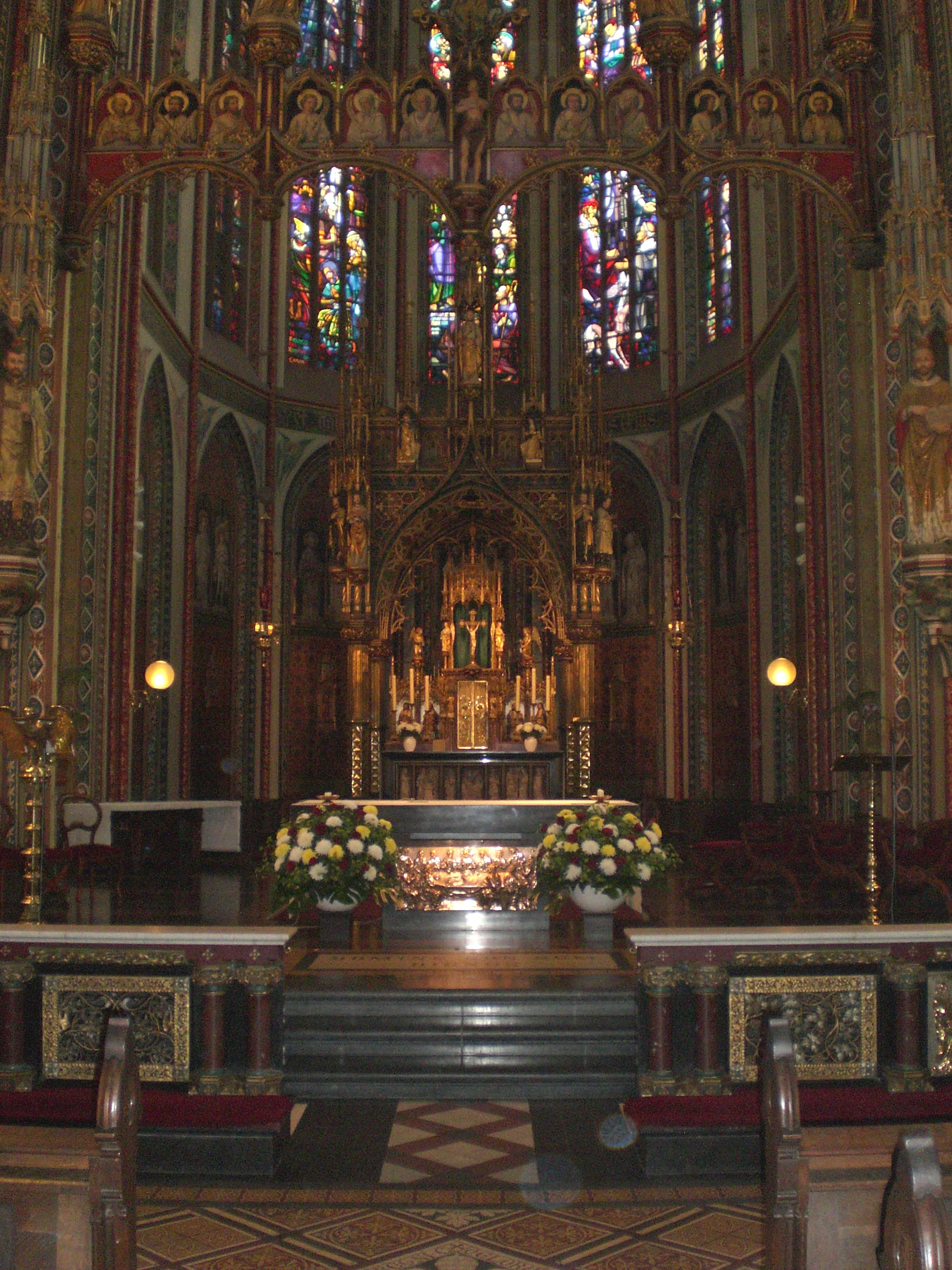
Sanctuary

== See also ==
- Society of Jesus
- Ignatian spirituality
- List of Jesuit sites in the Netherlands
- List of Catholic churches in the Netherlands
