= Conrad of Megenberg =

German Catholic scholar and writer

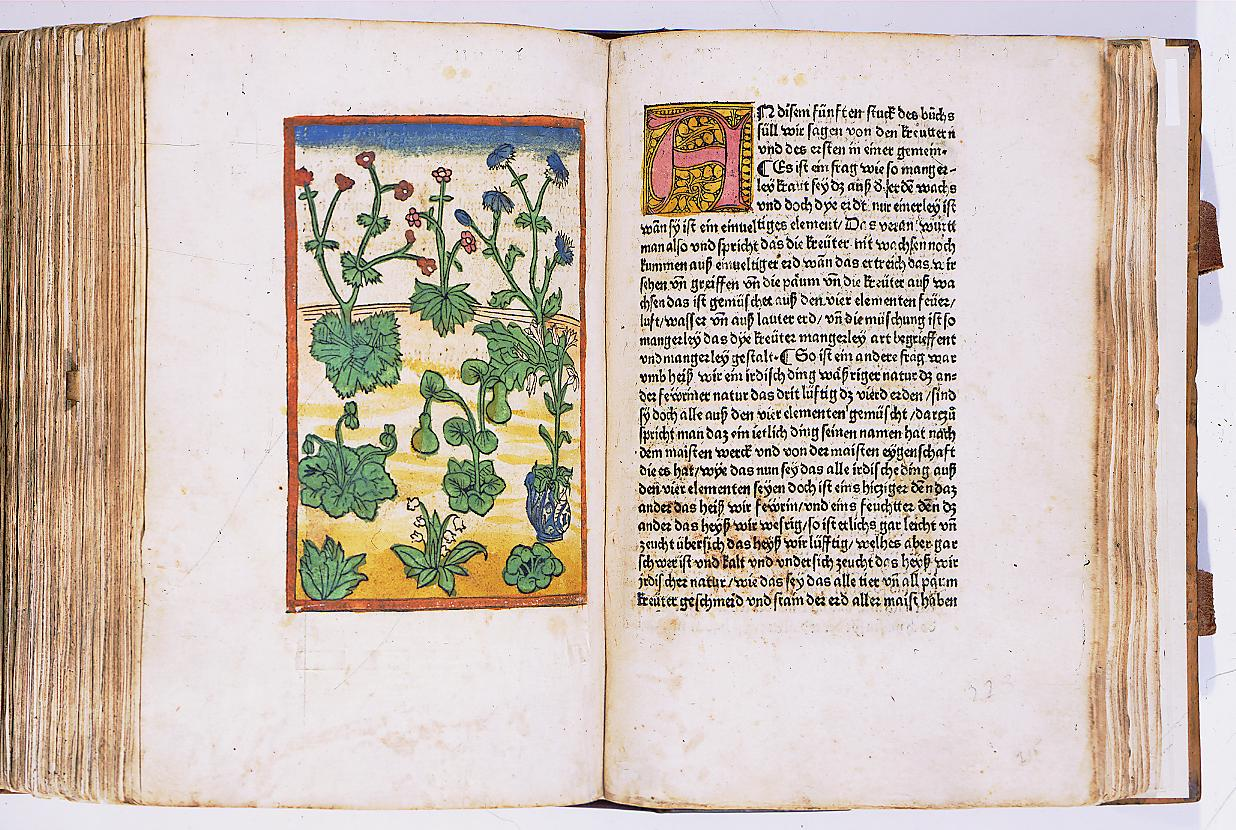
"He nach volget das Puch der Natur"

Conrad of Megenberg (German: Konrad von Megenberg, (Note: He is sometimes called Konrad von Mengelberg.) Latin: Conradus Megenbergensis; 1309–1374) was a German Catholic scholar, and a writer.

== Biography ==
Conrad was born in either Mainberg or Mebenburg, both in Bavaria. He was born on 2 February 1309. Conrad himself calls his native place Megenberg, hence continued confusion on his birthplace. He studied at Erfurt and the University of Paris; at the latter university he obtained the degree of Master of Arts, and he taught philosophy and theology at the University of Paris for several years.

By 1337 he was living in Vienna. That year he became head of St. Stephen's school. He relocated, in 1342, to Regensburg. There, he became a priest, then a preacher, and eventually a cathedral canon. He was also a member of the local town council. During the second occurrence of the Black Death in Europe (1348–1350), Konrad argued against the blame and persecution of the Jews that took place in many places. In 1357 he made a journey to the Papal Curia in 'Babylonian exile' at Avignon. He died at Regensburg on 11 April 1374.

== Works ==
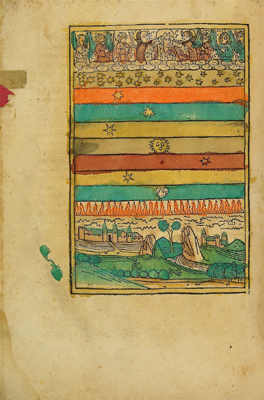
Woodcut from a 1481 Buch der Natur

Conrad was one of the most prolific German writers of the fourteenth century. He wrote over thirty books. His best-known and most widely read work is his "Buch der Natur". According to his own statement he was engaged in writing it in 1349. A Latin work, De naturis rerum, of the Dominican Thomas of Cantimpré (d. 1263), served as model. Conrad, however, prepared his book with considerable freedom; much of the original was omitted, his own observations were introduced, corrections were made, and so on. His work gives a survey of all that was known of natural history at that time and is, besides, the first natural history in the German language. It was widely read up to the sixteenth century, and numerous manuscript copies of it are still extant, eighteen being at Munich. The first printed edition with a date is of 1475, and was issued at Augsburg from the shop of Hans Bämler, under the title of "Puch der Natur". It was printed at least six times before 1500; some of the editions were illustrated, all are now rare incunabula. A new edition of the original text was issued by Franz Pfeiffer (Stuttgart, 1861), with an introduction; an edition in modern German was edited by H. Schulz (Greifswald, 1897).

The work has eight chapters

- the nature of man
- sky, 7 planets, astronomy and meteorology
- zoology
- ordinary and aromatic trees
- plants and vegetables
- invaluable and semi-precious stones
- 10 kinds of metals
- water and rivers.

Of Conrad's numerous other writings there should be mentioned:

- the "Sphære" 'Spheres', a small compendium in German of astronomy and physics, prepared from the Latin work of Joannes Sacrobosco
- some poems, including "Planctus ecclesiæ in Germania" (1337)
- a hymn in praise of the Virgin
- a work on morals, "Speculum felicitatis humanæ" 'mirror of human happiness' (1348)
- "De erroribus Begehardorum et Beguinarum" 'about the errors of Beghards and Beguines'
- "De translatione imperii" (1355) on the translatio imperii, i.e. 'succession' of empires
- the large work "Oeconomica", written between 1353 and 1363
- "Tractatus contra mendicantes ad Papam Urbanum V" 'treatise against mendicant (order)s addressed to Pope Urban V
- several biographies of saints
- some historical treatises, chiefly dealing with the local history of Ratisbon.

In his writings Conrad shows himself to be a strong adherent of the pope, an opponent of the philosophy of Occam, and a stern critic of the moral failings of his age and of the clergy.

== See also ==
- Henry of Unna
