= Friedrich Wilhelm Mengelberg =

German sculptor

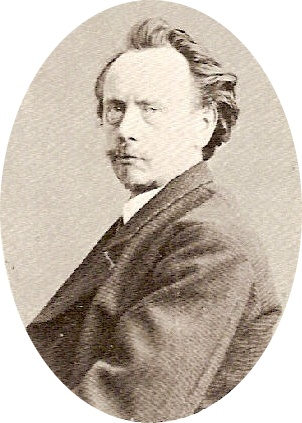
- c. 1900
- Born: 18 October 1837; Cologne
- Died: 6 February 1919 (aged 81)
- Resting place: Utrecht
- Occupation: sculptor
- Employer: St. Bemulphus guild
- Known for: architect of church interiors
- Spouse: Wilhelmina Helen
- Children: 16
- Parent(s): father: Johann Egidius Mengelberg mother: Catharina Wilhelmina Leiniger
- Relatives: grandfather: Egidius Mengelberg (1770–1849) uncle: Otto Heinrich (1817–1890)

Friedrich Wilhelm Mengelberg (1837–1919) was a German-Dutch sculptor, architect of church interiors, and art collector. His work promoted the Gothic Revival architectural-style in churches throughout Germany and the Netherlands. The Mengelberg family has a long history of various artists and professionals.

== Family members and early life ==
Mengelberg's parents were Johann Egidius Mengelberg and Catharina Wilhelmina Leiniger. His grandfather Egidius Mengelberg (1770–1849) was a well-known painter, as was his uncle, Otto Mengelberg (1817–1890). On 18 October 1866 Mengelberg married Wilhelmina Helen Schrattenholz, and together they had sixteen children – eight sons and eight daughters – including the conductor Willem Mengelberg (1871–1951); some of their children died young. Mengelberg's parents were Protestant, but when he turned eighteen he converted to Catholicism, probably influenced by his interest in medieval art.

== Career ==
Mengelberg came from a family of artists. He began his Neoclassical architecture training in Cologne under the sculptor Christoph Stephann (1797–1864). Friedrich (von) Schmidt subsequently instructed him in medieval art, especially Gothic art. He set up a studio in Cologne, managed by his younger brother Otto, but he left the studio to his brother Otto and moved to Aachen in about 1865. Mengelberg then became acquainted with the theologian and historian of ancient art Franz Johann Joseph Bock (1823–1899), who took him under his wing and further educated him in medieval art.

Through Bock's mediation, Mengelberg received a commission in 1868 to construct a bishop's throne for the Roman Catholic Saint Catherine's Cathedral in Utrecht. It was so well received by the church authorities that Mengelberg was invited to settle in Utrecht to build church furniture. He moved there in 1872, and became interested in the neo-Gothic art of the Netherlands. Mengelberg helped finish the interiors of Saint Catherine's Cathedral and Willibrord Church.

Mengelberg worked closely with Dutch architects Pierre Cuypers and Alfred Tepe, from whom he learnt more about artistic techniques. In 1869 he became a member of the St. Bemulphus guild founded by Gerardus Wilhelminus van Heukelum, a Utrecht group of Catholic clergy and artists working to bring back the traditions and craftmanship in religious art and architecture. Mengelberg became the most prominent member of the guild and set up a workshop studio, a closed society of specialized artists employing Gothic principles and techniques to produce items sold to the clergy. By the late 19th century Mengelberg's studio was employing more than 30 artists, designing and building items for church interiors such as organ fronts, communion pews, pulpits, altars, confessionals, and Stations of the Cross.

By the end of the 19th century there were many workshops producing church art, and competition between them was often intense. But Mengelberg was confident that his studio could always produce quality items equal to or better than his competitors, supported by a fairly clear artistic doctrine in his studio and the artists' dedication. After his death the studio continued under the control of two of his sons, Joseph and Hans.

Mengelberg's collection of art works was sold after his death by Jan Herman van Heek, a descendant of the well-known van Heek textile family. It formed the core of the Huis Bergh's art collection.

== Church interiors from Mengelberg studios ==
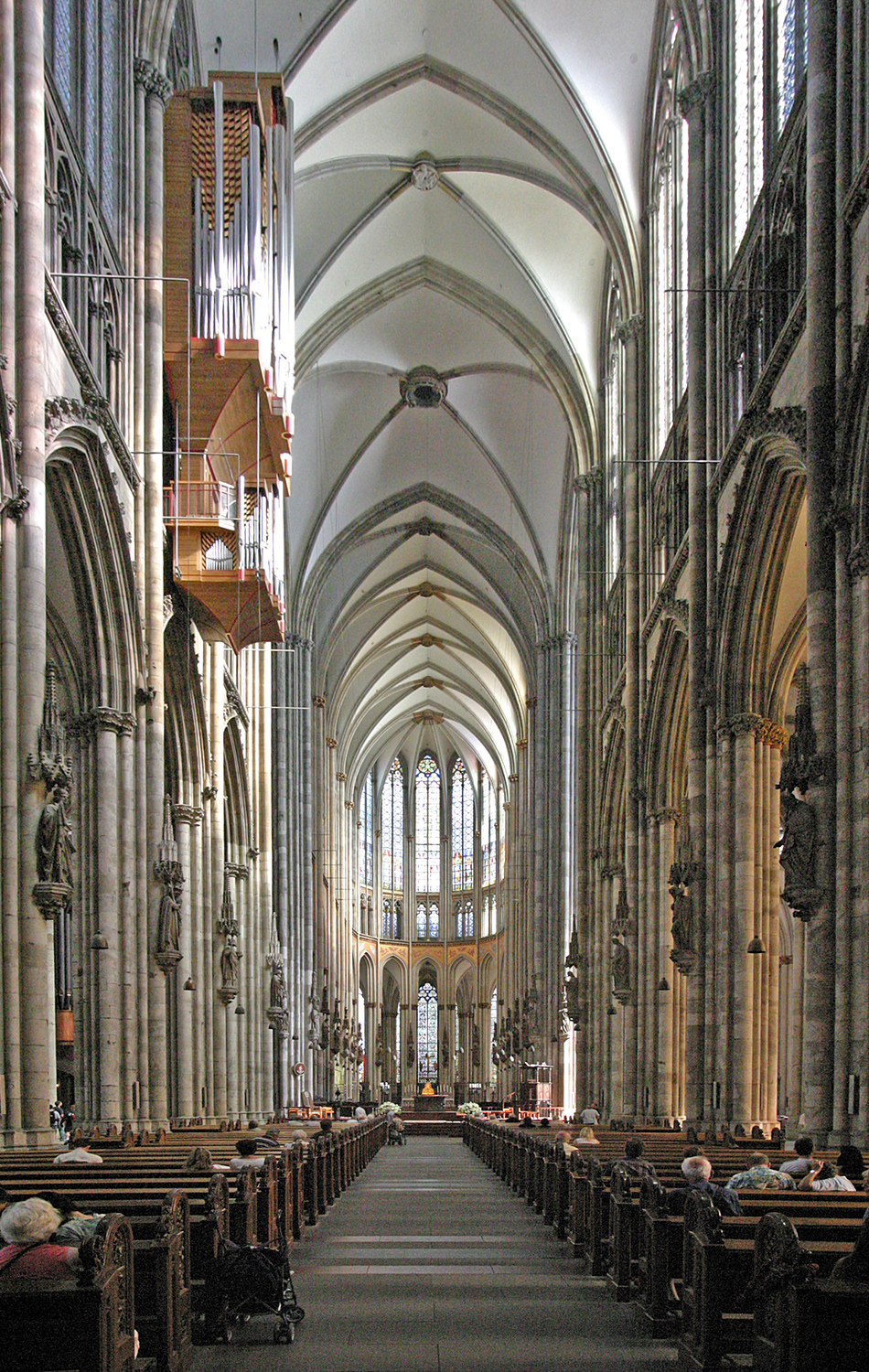
Cologne Cathedral interior

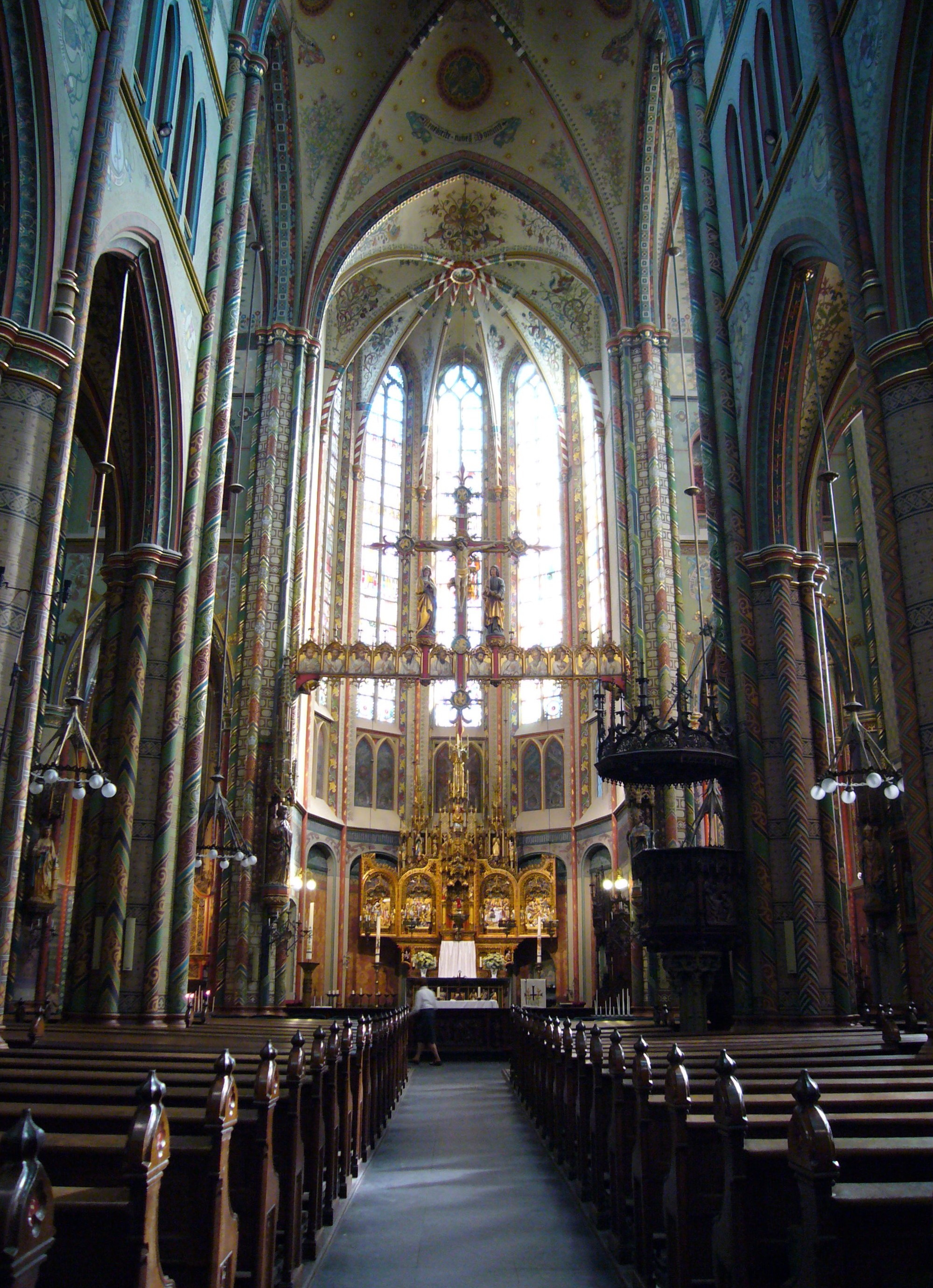
St. Willibrord Church interior, Utrecht

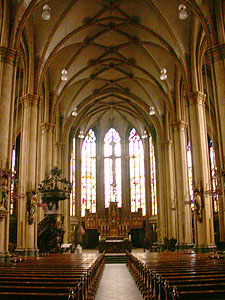
St. Nicholas Basilica, IJsselstein

Mengelberg built church furniture and other interior items for the following churches.

- Cologne Cathedral, Cologne, Germany
- Saint Willibrord's Church in Utrecht
- St. Nicholas' Basilica in IJsselstein
- The Chalk Mountain in Amsterdam
- St. Joseph's Cathedral in Groningen
- H. Exaltation to Raalte
- St. Michael's Church in Schalkwijk
- St. Joseph's Church in Enschede
- St. Mary's Church in Apeldoorn
- St. Vitus' Church in Hilversum
- St. Ludgeruskerk in Balk
- St. Michael's Church in Harlingen
- St. Werenfridus' Church in Workum
- Basilica of Our Lady of the Assumption in Zwolle
- St. Nicholas' Church in Jutphaas
- Pancratiuskerk in 's-Heerenberg
- St.Mariä Rosenkranz(Moenchengladbach-Eicken/Germany)

== Sources ==
- BWN, Biographical Dictionary of the Netherlands, second version, The Hague, 1985, publisher: ’s-Gravenhage : Nijhoff, ISBN 90-10-05501-9 (Dutch)

Charité, J., and Ivo Schöffer. Biografisch woordenboek van Nederland. 's-Gravenhage: Nijhoff, 1979.
Newberry Library call number: Ref CT 1143 .B56 The Newberry Library, Chicago, Il 60610
