= Victorine Nordenswan =

Finnish artist (1838–1872)

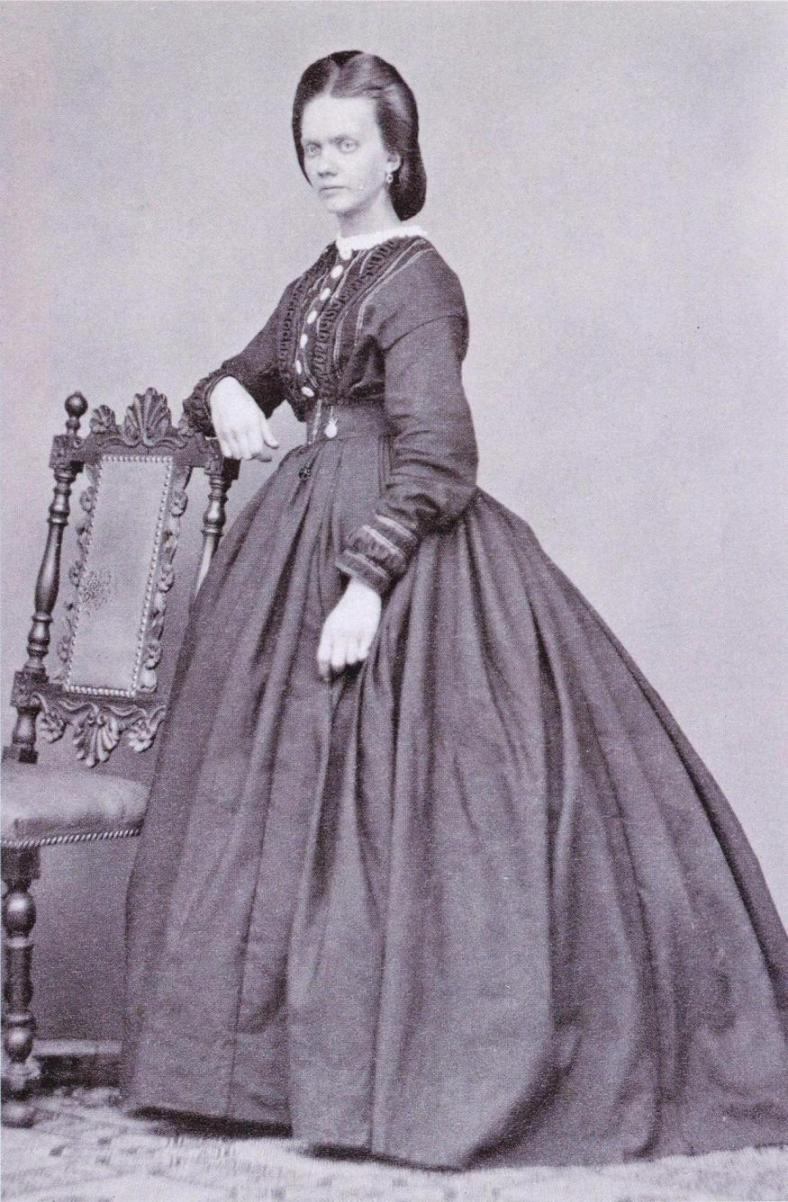
- Victorine Nordenswan (c. 1860s)
- Born: Hildur Antoinette Viktorine (Note: Shown in different sources alternatively as Victorine or Viktorine) Nordenswan; 14 June 1838; Hämeenlinna, Grand Duchy of Finland
- Died: 25 August 1872 (aged 34); Hämeenlinna
- Education: Royal Swedish Academy of Fine Arts
- Movement: Düsseldorf school of painting
- Awards: Dukaattipalkinto (1865, 1867)

Victorine Nordenswan (14 June 1838 – 25 August 1872) was a Finnish painter in the Düsseldorf tradition, specialising in religious themes, and notable as one of the first professional female artists of Finland.

== Early life and education ==
Hildur Antoinette Victorine Nordenswan was born on 1 June 1838 in Hämeenlinna, Grand Duchy of Finland, the third child and second daughter of Jacobina Fredrica von Numers (1808–1879) and embassy counsellor Johan Henrik Nordenswan (1801–1862).

Nordenswan received her initial education at a girls' school in Hämeenlinna, followed by attending an art school run by painters Berndt Godenhjelm (1799–1881) and Erik Johan Löfgren in the early 1860s. She trained at the Royal Swedish Academy of Fine Arts in Stockholm in 1860–1862. In 1864 she went to Düsseldorf, where she became a private pupil of Otto Mengelberg and Eduard Gebhardt. During the winters of 1867/1869 and 1869/1870 Nordenswan travelled back to Finland and returned once more during the Franco-Prussian War.

== Career ==
Visual art in the mid-19th century was male-dominated, but Nordenswan was considered to be exceptionally talented, and widely expected to make a significant career as an artist.

Nordenswan's public debut of her work was in 1861, and she won in the Finnish Art Society's Ducat Contest the second prize in 1865, followed by the first prize in 1867.

Among her best-known works are St. John the Evangelist (1866) and Women Mourning at Christ’s Grave (1868), both today housed at the Finnish National Gallery.

Nordenswan's promising career was cut short by her death from tuberculosis at the early age of 34.

== Gallery ==
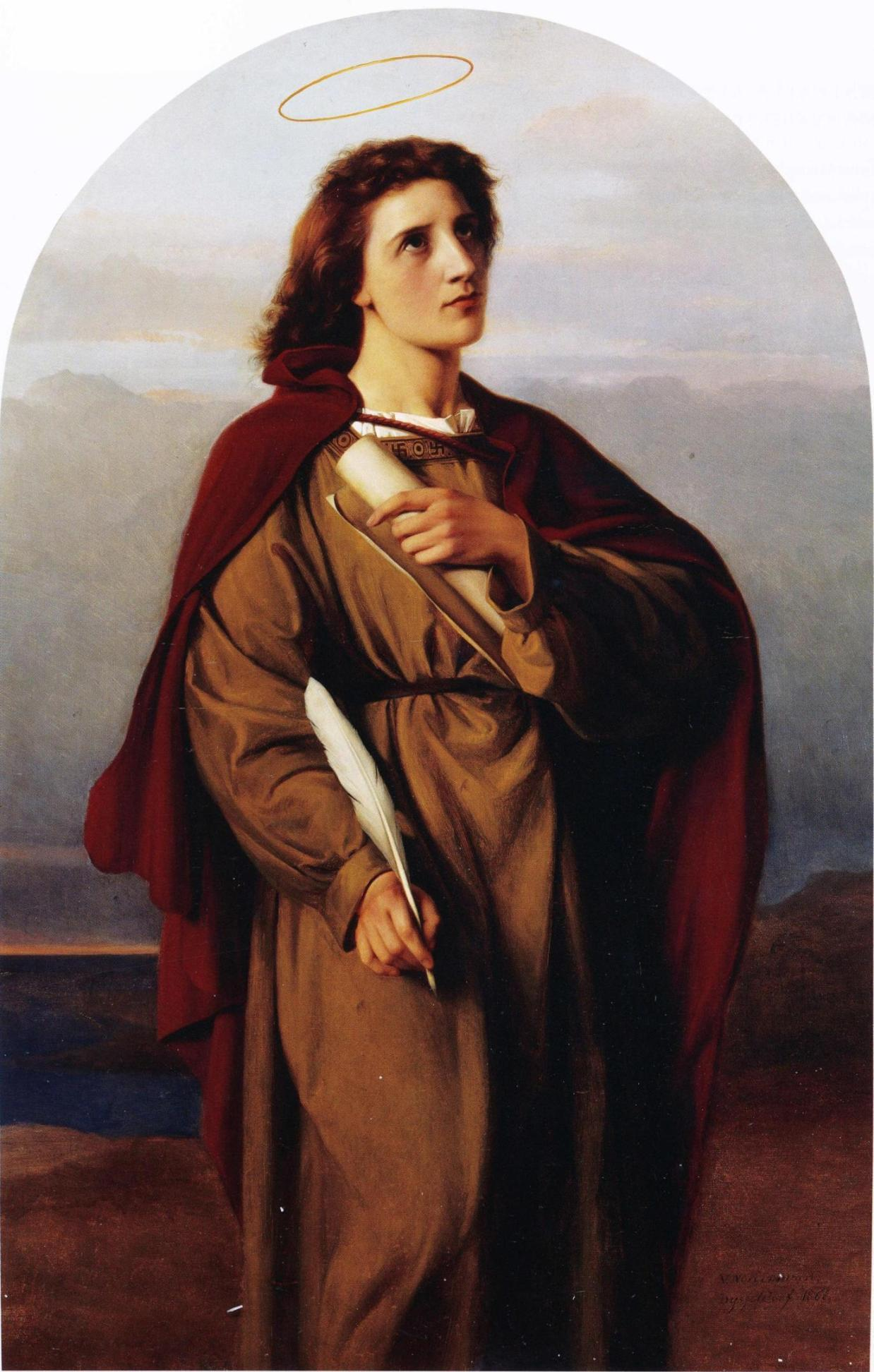
St. John the Evangelist (1866)

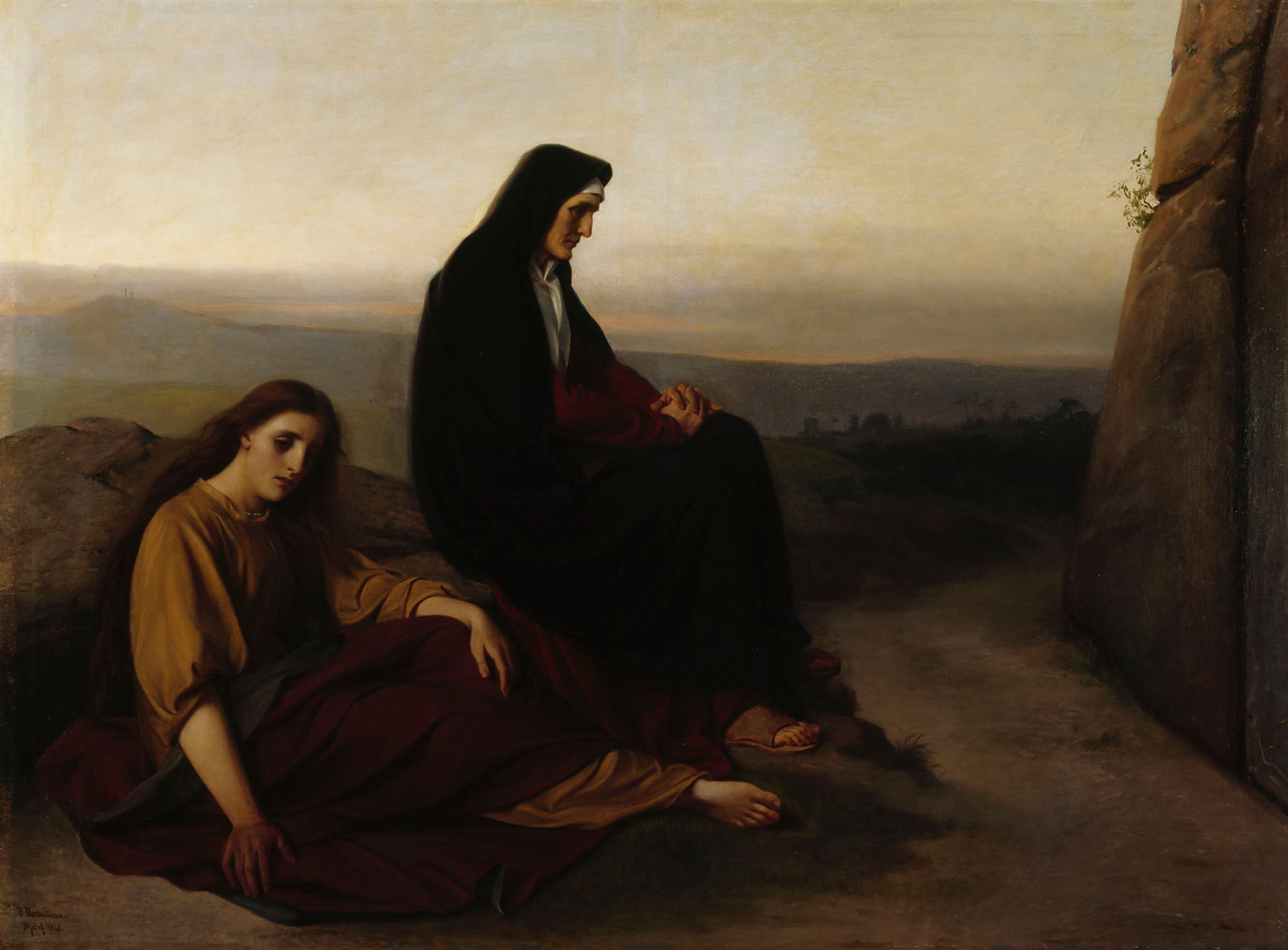
Women Mourning at Christ’s Grave (1868)

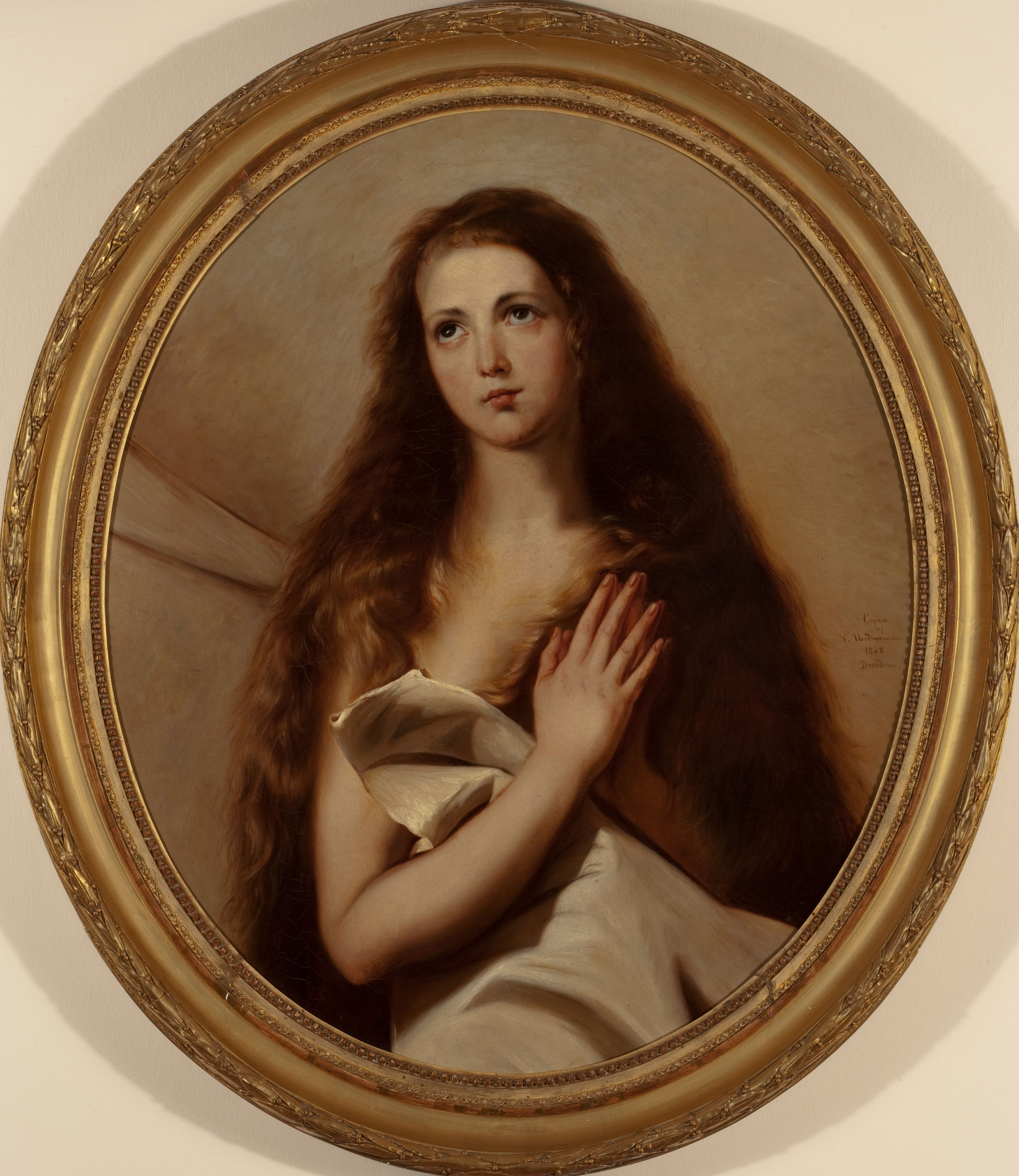
St. Agnes of Rome, copy after Jusepe de Ribera, detail, 1868
