= Goldbeck (surname) =

Goldbeck is a surname. Notable people with the surname include:

- Fred Goldbeck (1902–1981), French musicologist and conductor
- Johann Friedrich Goldbeck (1748–1812), German geographer and Protestant theologian
- Willis Goldbeck (1898–1979), American screenwriter and film director
