= Paul Begheyn =

Dutch Jesuit historian

Paul J. Begheyn (born 1944) is a Dutch Jesuit historian.

== Life ==
Begheyn was educated at the Jesuit secondary school De Breul in Katwijk aan den Rijn (South Holland) and joined the Society of Jesus in September 1963. In 1985 he became the first director of the Ignatiushuis in Amsterdam.

He became a historian of the order, primarily in the Netherlands, and bibliographer of Jesuit publications. He was the director of the Dutch Institute for Jesuit Studies, and a frequent book reviewer in the Jesuit-run cultural review Streven.

== Publications ==
Books

- Gebeden om vrede (1983)
- Twintig psalmen hertaald (1987)
- Nico Kluiters sj, 1940-1985: Missionaris martelaar (1988)
- Wat ga je doen met je leven? (1988)
- with Els F.M. Peters, Gheprint te Nymeghen: Nijmeegse drukkers, uitgevers en boekverkopers, 1479-1794 (1990)
- Verwondering en verlangen: De spiritualiteit van de jezuïeten (1990)
- Bibliography on the History of the Jesuits: Publications in English, 1900-1993 (1996)
- Maar wie ben ik? Metamorfose van een roeping (1999)
- Gids voor de geschiedenis van de jezuïeten in Nederland, 1540-1850 (2002)
- Petrus Canisius en zijn catechismus: De geschiedenis van een bestseller (2005)
- Gids voor de geschiedenis van de jezuïeten in Nederland, 1850-2000 (2006)
- Jan van Kilsdonk: Portret van een hartstochtelijk pastor (2008)
- with Ton Ruys, Adam Beckers en de herleving van de Jezuiëtenorde in de Nederlanden (2012)
- Jan Toorop, Autobiografische herinneringen 1858-1886 zoals gedicteerd aan Anton Reichling SJ in 1927, edited by Paul Begheyn (Waanders, Zwolle 2009)
- Jan Toorop, Correspondentie met jezuïeten, 1908-1927, edited by Paul Begheyn (2014)
- Jesuit Books in the Low Countries, 1540-1773, edited by Paul Begheyn, Bernard Deprez and Rob Faesen (Leuven, 2009)
- Jesuit Books in the Dutch Republic and its Generality Lands 1567-1773: A Bibliography. Leiden and Boston: Brill, 2014. ISBN 9789004270602
- De Nederlandse jezuïeten: Een geschiedenis in 50 voorwerpen (2019)
- with Tom Gribnau, Pim Boer and Leo Nellissen, Martiaal en theatraal: De jezuïeten in Ravenstein (1643-1772) (2019)

Articles

- "De handschriften van het St-Agnietenklooster te Arnhem", Ons Geestelijk Erf, 45 (1971), pp. 3-44. On manuscripts from St Agnes Convent, Arnhem.
- "Six Unpublished Letters of Saint Peter Canisius to His Relatives", Archivum Historicum Societatis Iesu, 55 (1986), pp. 129–44. On the family of St Peter Canisius.
- "In de schuilkelders van het Canisiuscollege, september-november 1944", Jaarboek Numaga, 41 (1994), pp. 154-182. On Canisius College, Nijmegen in the final stages of the Second World War.
