= Henry of Unna =

Henry of Unna was proctor of the University of Paris in the 14th century, beginning his term on January 13, 1340. He was preceded as proctor by Conrad of Megenberg. A native of Denmark, Henry of Unna's term as proctor extended until February 10, 1341.

He is associated primarily with the publication of a statute of the Faculty of Arts of the University of Paris against Ockhamism. This was issued during his proctorship. Henry of Unna was forced to replace the proctor's seal with a new one in 1341.

During his term Henry of Unna led Nicolaus de Dacia to his master's degree and another student, Laurentius de Dacia, to his introductory bachelor's examination. Two years later Nicolaus 'Drukken' de Dacia was promoted to proctor.
