= Fred Goldbeck =

French musicologist and conductor

Fred Goldbeck (13 February 1902 – 3 October 1981 in Paris) was a French musicologist and conductor of Dutch origin.

== Biography ==
Born in the Netherlands, Fred Goldbeck moved to France in 1924. He met the pianist Yvonne Lefébure and became her companion before the Second World War. They got married in 1947.

As a conductor, he was first of all a disciple of Mengelberg and Furtwängler. Thus he wrote an important first book: Le parfait chef d'orchestre. Thereafter, he defended the works of contemporary composers such as Busoni and Britten, until Boulez and Xenakis. He also promoted Dutch musicians such as Alphons Diepenbrock, Matthijs Vermeulen and Willem Pijper.

== Writings ==
=== Monographs ===
- Fred Goldbeck (1952). Le parfait chef d'orchestre (in French). Paris: Presses universitaires de France. p. 184.
- Fred Goldbeck (1954). Le rythme musical : rythme, rythmique, métrique (in French). Paris: Presses universitaires de France. p. 247.
- Fred Goldbeck (1954). Musique du son, musique du verbe (in French). Paris: Presses universitaires de France. p. 217.
- Fred Goldbeck (1988). Des compositeurs au XXe : France, Italie, Espagne (in French). Paris: Parution musique. p. 188. ISBN 2-9063500-4-4., foreword by Rémy Stricker.

=== Articles ===
- Fred Goldbeck (1977). "Défense et illustration de Berlioz". La Revue Musicale (in French). No. 267. Paris., 24 p.
- Pierre Boulez; Fred Goldbeck; Virgil Thomson (1977). "Le Musicien dans la cité; Textes retrouvés". La Revue Musicale (in French). No. 306–307. Paris. 107 p

=== Publisher ===
- Alfred Cortot; Fred Goldbeck (1936). Traités et autres ouvrages théoriques des XV^{e}, XVI^{e}, XVII^{e} and XVIII^{e} siècles (in French). Argenteuil: R. Coulouma. p. 212., foreword by Henry Prunières

=== Correspondence ===
- Yvonne Lefébure; Fred Goldbeck (1996). Guides de haute musique (in French). Gentilly: Albin Michel. p. 282. ISBN 2-9505658-4-0.
- Wilhelm Furtwängler; Fred Goldbeck (1953). Entretiens sur la musique (in French). Paris: Albin Michel. p. 159., translated by Jacques-Gabriel Prod'homme
