= Guild of St. Bernulphus =

Religious association

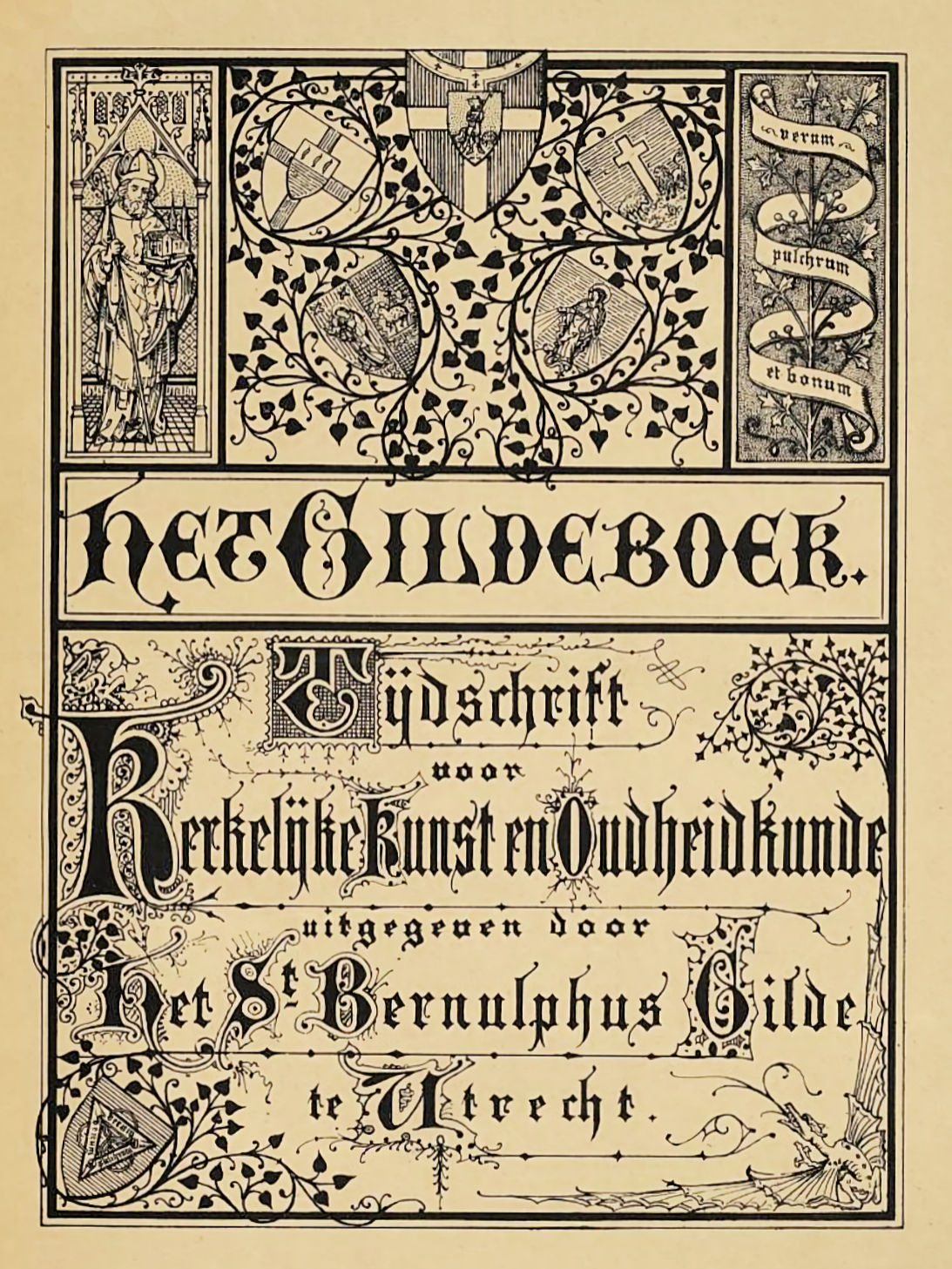
The Guild Book magazine of church art and antiquities published by the St. Bernulphus Guild in Utrecht

The St. Bernulphusgilde or Guild of St. Bernulphus was a Dutch Catholic secret society established on December 1, 1869. Its intention initially was to serve as a trade union and protect national traditions of old craftsmanship in religious art and church architecture. Information about the association's meetings, as well as trade information, was published in their magazine The Guild Book. The association was considered a guild and named after the 11th-century bishop of Utrecht, a passionate church builder named Bernold.

== Establishment ==
The association was established in Utrecht, founded by Gerard van Heukelum, at that time chaplain of St. Catherine's Cathedral in that city, from the idea of the Flemish St. Thomas Guild and St. Lucas Guild. Membership was originally open only to clergy, but the guild flourished when membership was extended to certain religious artists and architects. Although guild members worked mainly in the Netherlands in the Utrecht province, and to a lesser extent in other parts of the archdiocese, it played an important role in the construction and furnishing of churches throughout the Netherlands. Many well-known artists and craftsmen from the Rhineland were welcomed. The association was strict about conforming to particular requirements of style and obtained important jobs because of this.

The guild stayed active until the 1930s.

== Style ==
The prescribed style for church construction was a conservative variant of the Gothic Revival architecture that focused on indigenous varieties of the late Gothic period, particularly the Gothic Lower Rhine, and was done almost exclusively in brick. The so-called "Utrecht School" of the association contrasted with the much more progressive views of Pierre Cuypers, who was an honorary member but for whom Gothic Revival was just a starting point for innovation. The design of the Willibrord church in Utrecht is one of many that followed the concepts of the St. Bernulphus guild association and is one of its best-preserved examples. The first church both built and decorated according to the ideas of the guild was the St. Nicolas in Jutphaas, of which Van Heukelum was appointed priest, in 1874.

Founder Van Heukelum's collection of art from medieval times served as examples to form a museum in 1872. It was available to the public. This museum in 1882 was elevated to the Archbishop's Museum, the predecessor of the current Museum Catharijneconvent.

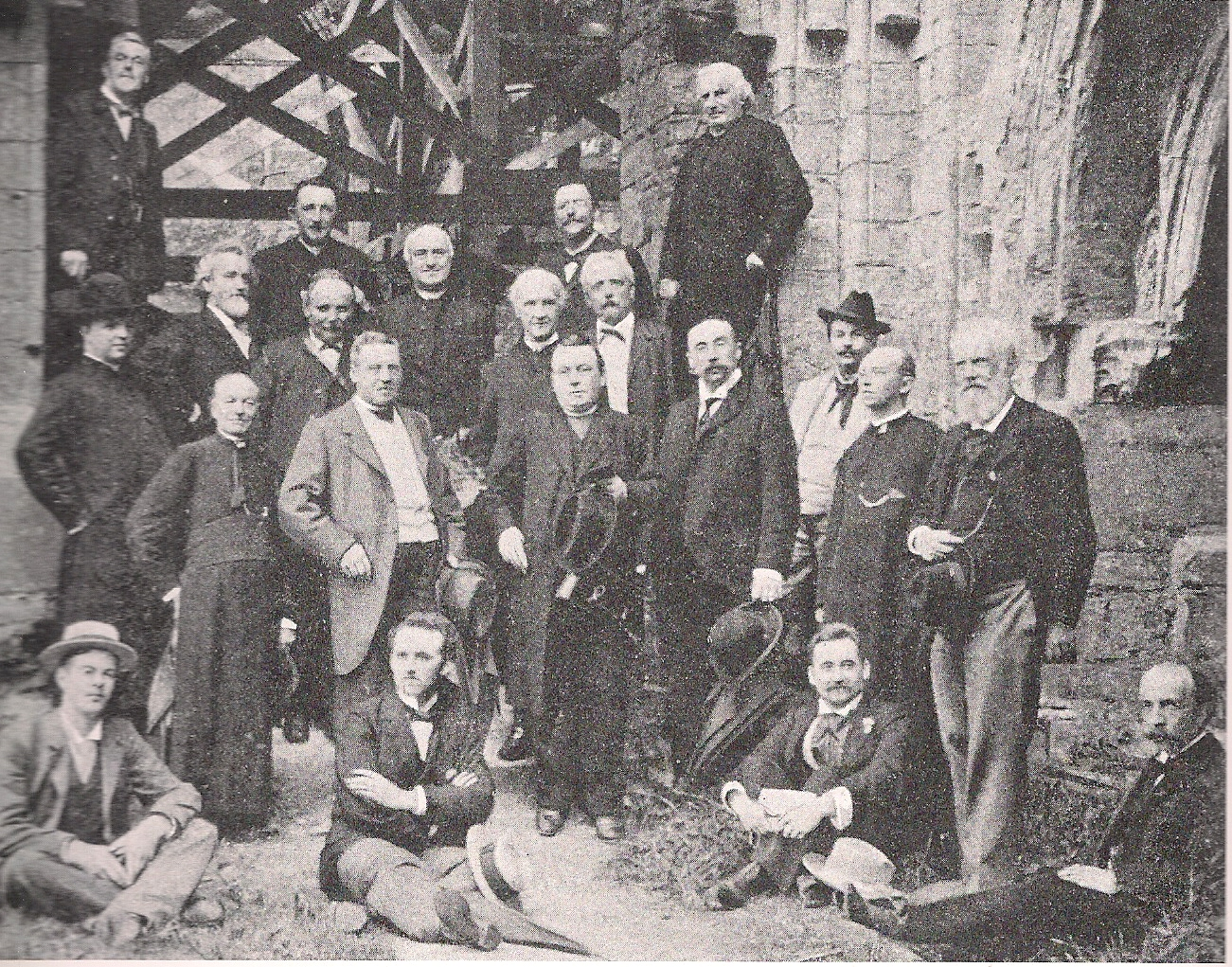
St. Bernulphus Guild in 1900. To right stands Gerald van Heukelum, founder.

== Members ==
- Gerard Brom (1831–1882), silversmith
- Jan Brom, silversmith, son of Gerard Brom
- Heinrich J. J. Geuer (1841–1904), stained-glass artist
- Albert Kniep, metalworker
- Johannes Franciscus Augustinus Lindsen (1939–1910), antiquarian.
- Chrétien Lindsen (1840–1898), painter
- Michaël Maarschalkerweerd, organ builder
- Friedrich Wilhelm Mengelberg (1837–1919), sculptor
- Otto Maria Maximiliaan Mengelberg (1867–1924), sculptor and stained-glass artist, son of Friedrich Wilhelm Mangelberg
- Martinus Christiaan Schenk (1833–1911), painter
- J. Schillemans
- Alfred Tepe, architect
- P. W. van der Weijer, publisher

== Attitude ==
St. Bernulphus guild association was run more like a fraternity than a scholarly society. This characterization was typified by discussions being postponed due to copious dinners that overran their allotted time. Their meetings usually ended up in fraternal jovial feasting. The guild association even had its own song that was sung by the members. The song lyrics were written by Herman Schaepman (1844-1903), a priest.

== Sources ==
- Cortjaens, Wolfgang, Historism and cultural identity in the Rhine-Meuse region: tensions between nationalism and regionalism in the nineteenth century, Leuven University Press, 2008, ISBN 90-5867-666-8
