= Egidius Mengelberg =

German painter

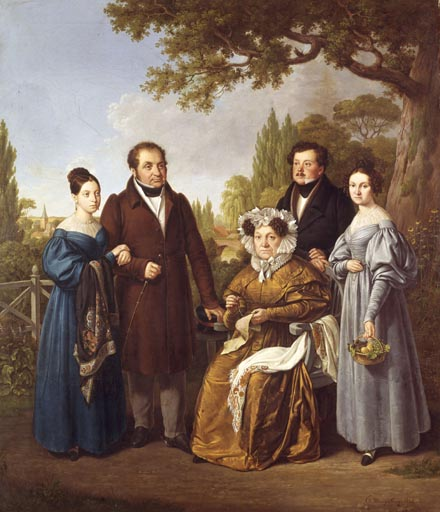
The Windgassen Family

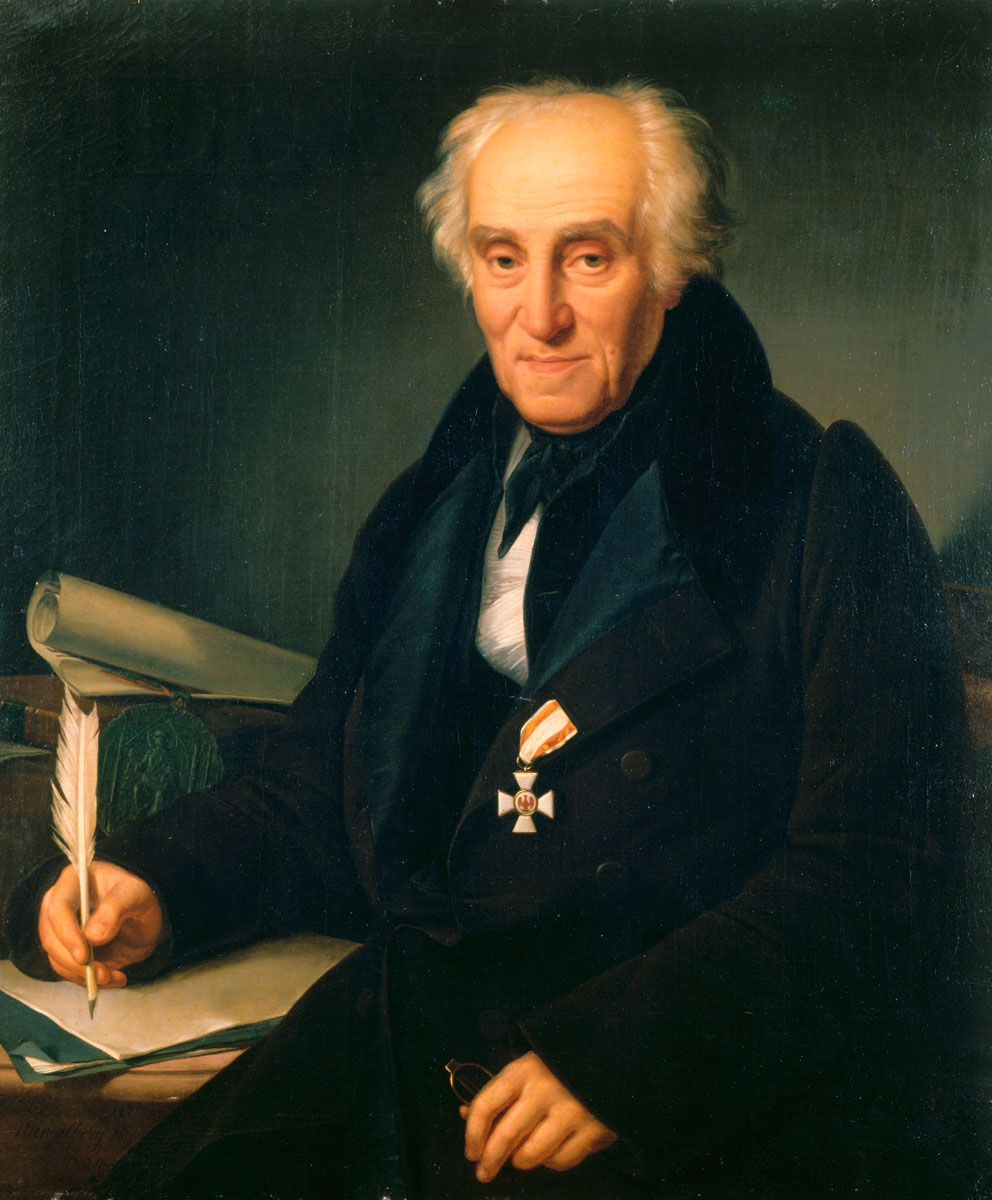
Portrait of Ferdinand Franz Wallraf

Egidius Mengelberg (8 April 1770 – 26 October 1849) was a German portrait painter, interior designer and art teacher.

== Life and work ==
He was born in Cologne. His family was originally from Linz am Rhein, where it can be traced back to the 16th century. At the age of thirteen, he took lessons from Johann Peter von Langer in Düsseldorf. Three years later, he started his own drawing school in Cologne. In 1790, he copied works at the Gemäldegalerie Düsseldorf on behalf of Charles Theodore, Elector of Bavaria, for a copper engraving catalog of the collection. During the French occupation of the Left Bank of the Rhine, he lived in Koblenz, where he painted portraits of French military personnel.

In 1800, he went to Elberfeld, where his father was living with his stepmother. It was a growing industrial city so, in a short time, he was able to establish himself as a fashionable portraitist. When Heinrich Christoph Kolbe returned to Düsseldorf in 1811, Mengelberg contacted him, eager to acquire the techniques Kolbe had learned in Paris. He began to imitate Kolbe's style in such an obvious way, that Kolbe angrily rejected him and refused to continue his lessons. As a result, Mengelberg turned to designing wallpapers, wall murals, and furnishings for the wealthy families of Elberfeld.

During this time, he fell in love with Anne Lisette Risse, whose strict Protestant parents would not allow her to marry a Catholic. In 1813, they eloped to Düsseldorf, where their first son, Johann Edmund Egidius, was born in January 1814. After she became pregnant with their second son, Otto (who would also become a painter), her parents relented and agreed to a formal marriage, which took place in 1816.

In 1822, they settled in Cologne and he founded the "Elementar-Zeichenschule für Bauleute und Professionalisten" (Elementary Drawing School for Builders and Professionals), a private Sunday school where unskilled workers were taught various arts and crafts, free of charge. He eventually had several hundred students. He operated the school until his death in 1849.

He was interred at the Melaten cemetery. A street in the Altstadt-Süd district of Cologne has been named after him. The famous orchestra conductor, Willem Mengelberg, was his great-grandson.

== Sources ==
- Johann Jakob Merlo: Nachrichten von dem Leben und den Werken kölnischer Künstler. Heberle, Köln 1850, S. 285
- Johann Jakob Merlo (1885). "Mengelberg, Egidius" . Allgemeine Deutsche Biographie (in German). Vol. 21. Leipzig: Duncker & Humblot. pp. 347–348.
- Friedrich Everhard von Mering, Ludwig Reischert: Zur Geschichte der Stadt Köln am Rhein: Von ihrer Gründung bis zur Gegenwart. Joh. Wilh. Dieß, Cologne, 1838 Vol.1, pg. 278
- Marie-Luise Baum: "Egidius Mengelberg", In: Wuppertaler Biographien, 10th ed., Wuppertal, 1971
- Michael Werling: Architekturlehrer der FH Köln Teil I / Die Ehemaligen, 35th anniversary of the Dept. of Architecture, Cologne University of Applied Sciences, 2006
