= Rudolf Mengelberg =

Dutch composer and musicologist (1892–1959)

Curt Rudolf Mengelberg
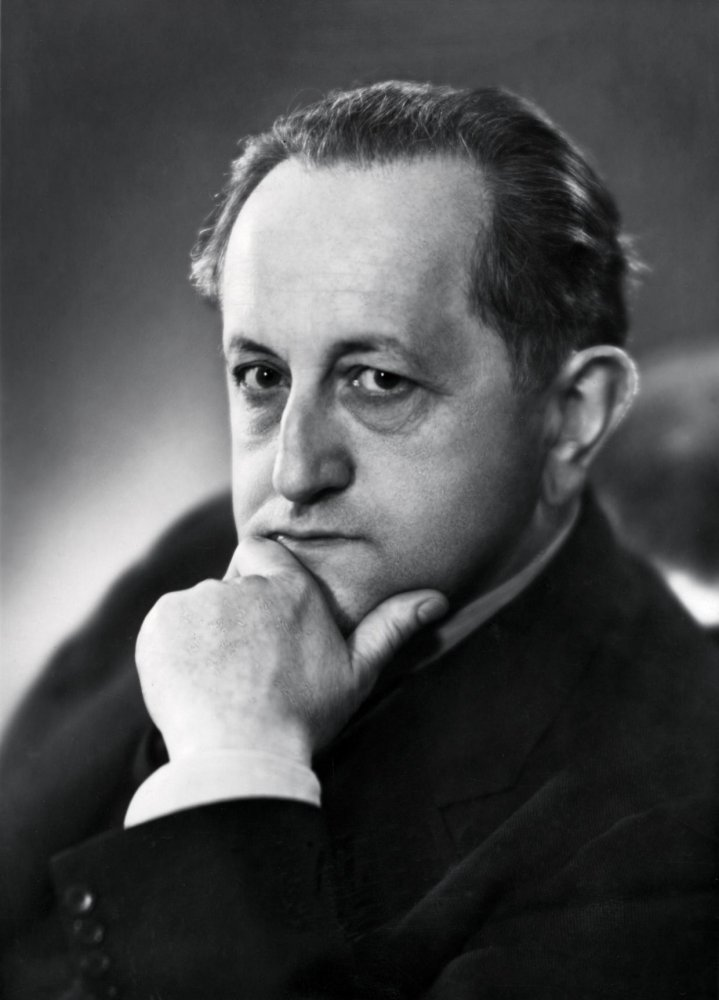
- Born: 1 February 1892; Krefeld, Germany
- Died: 13 October 1959 (aged 67); Beausoleil, France
- Occupations: Composer, musicologist, concert administrator
- Relatives: Willem Mengelberg (cousin)

Curt Rudolf Mengelberg (1 February 1892 – 13 October 1959) was a German-born Dutch composer and musicologist. From 1925 he was the artistic leader of Het Concertgebouw N.V., the company that ran Amsterdam's main concert hall, and from 1935 to 1955 its general director. He was a cousin of the conductor Willem Mengelberg.

Mengelberg studied law and then musicology. He took a doctorate at Leipzig in 1915 with a dissertation on the Italian composer Giovanni Alberto Ristori. He joined the Concertgebouw in 1917 and organised the Mahler Festival held in Amsterdam in 1920. He stayed in his post during the German occupation of the Netherlands. In 1945 he was removed from office, and in 1947 the Central Honour Council reinstated him. He left the Concertgebouw in 1955, after the concert-hall company and the orchestra were split into two organisations, and settled near Monte Carlo, where he died in 1959. He wrote mainly vocal and sacred music.

== Early life and education ==
Mengelberg was a cousin of the conductor Willem Mengelberg, who led the Concertgebouw Orchestra for almost half a century. The two were distantly related. He first studied law, in Geneva, Munich and Bonn, and then musicology at Leipzig, where his teachers included Hugo Riemann and, for piano, Otto Neitzel. In 1915 he took a doctorate under Riemann with a dissertation on the Italian Baroque composer Giovanni Alberto Ristori. It was the first study of that composer and was published in 1916. He then went to Amsterdam to finish his training, studying composition with Cornelis Dopper and instrumentation with Willem Mengelberg.

== Career at the Concertgebouw ==
Mengelberg joined Het Concertgebouw N.V., the company running the Amsterdam concert hall, in 1917. He became artistic leader in 1925 and general director in 1935. In 1920 he organised the Mahler Festival in Amsterdam and compiled its commemorative book. He also organised a festival of French music in 1922 and one of Dutch music in 1935, set up the Concertgebouw chamber-music series, and wrote the notes for the hall's concert programmes.

Mengelberg remained in his post during the German occupation of the Netherlands. His conduct was assessed after the liberation and he was removed from office in 1945. The Central Honour Council (Centrale Ereraad) reconsidered the case and reinstated him in a ruling of 28 January 1947, stating that his pro-Dutch and anti-National-Socialist attitude was not in doubt. Paul Cronheim, a Concertgebouw board member who wrote Mengelberg's biographical memoir, recorded that Mengelberg had supported Jewish friends and orchestra members during the occupation.

In the mid-1950s the concert-hall company and the orchestra were split into two organisations. Mengelberg left his post and the Netherlands, and settled in Beausoleil, near Monte Carlo, where he died in 1959.

== Compositions ==
Mengelberg started composing in his twenties, writing songs and chamber music. Vocal music stayed at the centre of his work, and as a practising Catholic he wrote more and more sacred music. His Requiem (1924), a setting of his own text for solo voice and orchestra, was first performed by the Concertgebouw Orchestra under Willem Mengelberg in December 1924. His cantata Weinlese won a composition competition held by the Society for the Advancement of Music (Maatschappij tot Bevordering der Toonkunst) for its centenary and was first performed in March 1930. His other works include the Missa pro Pace (1932), the Stabat Mater (1941), the Magnificat (1942) for alto and orchestra, the Salve Regina, the Symfonische variatie for cello and orchestra (1927), the Victimae Paschali Laudes, the Hymne op Amstelredam and the Ballade van de boer. According to Cronheim, his music was closest to Schubert and also showed the influence of Mahler, whose work he promoted. Willem Mengelberg, who never recorded any of his own compositions, did record his cousin's Salve Regina.

== Writings ==
In 1923 Mengelberg published a biography of Mahler. He wrote the notes for the Concertgebouw's concert programmes and several books on the cultural history of music, among them Muziek, Spiegel des Tijds (1948).
