= Willem Mengelberg =

Dutch conductor (1871–1951)

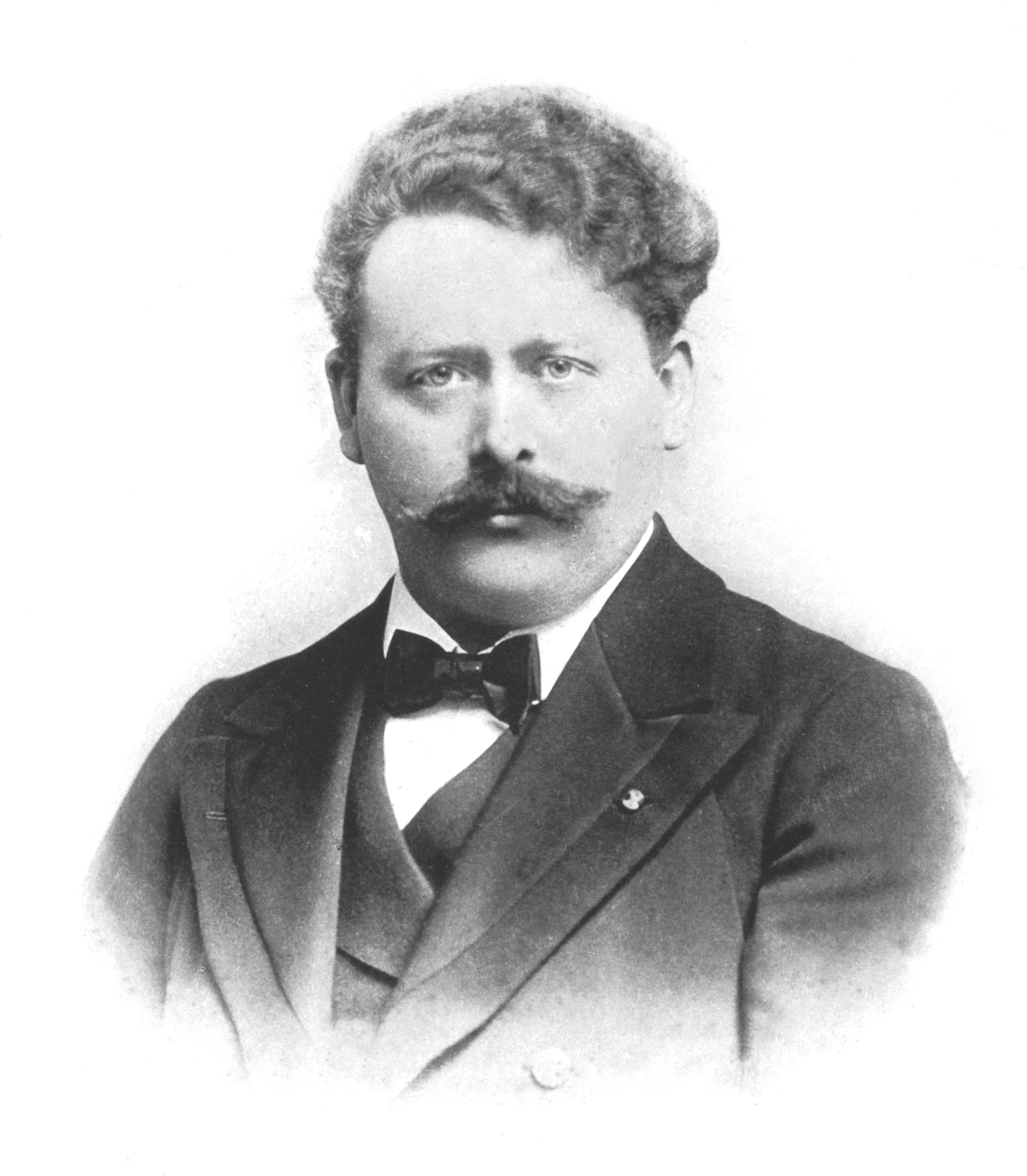
- Born: 28 March 1871; Utrecht, Netherlands
- Died: 21 March 1951 (aged 79); Zuort, Sent, Switzerland
- Occupation: Conductor
- Years active: 1891–1945

Joseph Wilhelm Mengelberg (28 March 1871 – 21 March 1951) was a Dutch conductor, famous for his performances of Beethoven, Brahms, Mahler and Strauss with the Concertgebouw Orchestra in Amsterdam. He is widely regarded as one of the greatest symphonic conductors of the 20th century.

== Biography ==
Mengelberg was the fourth of fifteen children of German-born parents in Utrecht, Netherlands. His father was the Dutch-German sculptor Friedrich Wilhelm Mengelberg. He was a distant cousin of the musicologist and composer Rudolf Mengelberg and the uncle of the conductor, composer and critic Karel Mengelberg, who was himself the father of the pianist and composer Misha Mengelberg. After studies in Utrecht with the composer and conductor Richard Hol, the composer Anton Averkamp (1861–1934) and the violinist Henri Wilhelm Petri (1856–1914), Mengelberg went on to study piano and composition at the Cologne conservatory (now the Hochschule für Musik Köln), where his principal teachers were Franz Wüllner, Isidor Seiss and Adolf Jensen.

In 1891, when he was 20, he was chosen as general music director of the city of Lucerne Switzerland, where he conducted an orchestra and a choir, directed a music school, taught piano lessons and continued to compose. Four years later, in 1895, when he was 24, Mengelberg was appointed principal conductor of the Concertgebouw Orchestra, a position he held until 1945.

In this position, Mengelberg was to premiere a number of notable orchestral works. For example, in 1898, Richard Strauss dedicated his tone poem Ein Heldenleben to Mengelberg and the Concertgebouw Orchestra, telling journalists that he "had at last found an orchestra capable of playing all passages, so that he no longer needed to feel embarrassed when writing difficulties". Among other notable premieres were those on 29 March 1939, when Mengelberg conducted the premiere of the Violin Concerto No. 2 by Béla Bartók with violinist Zoltán Székely, and on 23 November 1939, he premiered the Peacock Variations of Zoltán Kodály.

Mengelberg founded the long-standing Mahler tradition of the Concertgebouw. He met and befriended Gustav Mahler in 1902, and invited Mahler to conduct his Third Symphony in Amsterdam in 1903, and on 23 October 1904 Mahler led the orchestra in his Fourth Symphony twice in one concert, with no other work on the program. Mahler wrote to his wife Alma Mahler that this programming idea (presumably Mengelberg's) was a "stroke of genius". Mahler regularly visited The Netherlands to introduce his work to Dutch audiences, including also his First, Fifth, and Seventh Symphonies, as well as Das klagende Lied and Kindertotenlieder. Mahler edited some of his symphonies while rehearsing them with the Concertgebouw Orchestra, making them sound better for the acoustics of the Concertgebouw. This is perhaps one reason that this concert hall and its orchestra are renowned for their Mahler tradition. In 1920, Mengelberg instituted a Mahler Festival in which all the composer's music was performed in nine concerts.

Mengelberg also founded, in 1899, the annual Concertgebouw tradition of performing the St. Matthew Passion of Johann Sebastian Bach on Palm Sunday.

One criticism of Mengelberg's influence over Dutch musical life, most clearly articulated by the composer Willem Pijper, was that Mengelberg did not particularly champion Dutch composers during his Concertgebouw tenure, especially after 1920.

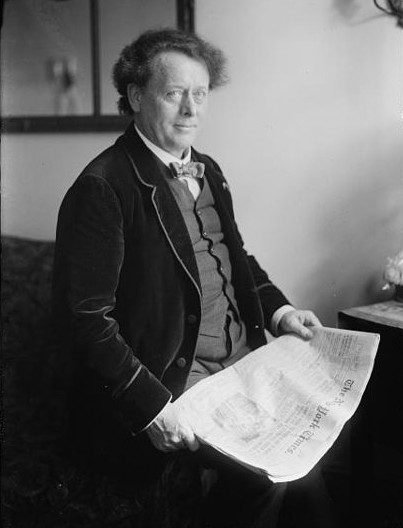
Mengelberg with The New York Times

Mengelberg was music director of the New York Philharmonic Orchestra from 1922 to 1928. Beginning in January 1926, he shared the podium with Arturo Toscanini; Toscanini biographer Harvey Sachs has documented that Mengelberg and Toscanini clashed over interpretations of music and even rehearsal techniques, creating division among the musicians that eventually resulted in Mengelberg leaving the orchestra. Mengelberg made a series of recordings with the Philharmonic for both the Victor Talking Machine Company and Brunswick Records, including a 1928 electrical recording of Richard Strauss' Ein Heldenleben that was later reissued on LP and CD. One of his first electrical recordings, for Victor, was a two-disc set devoted to A Victory Ball by Ernest Schelling.

In 1933, Mengelberg generated negative publicity in what was known as the "Mengelberg Crisis". Mengelberg had changed his residence to Switzerland to evade high tax rates in the country.

Mengelberg was described by Fred Goldbeck as "the perfect dictator/conductor, a Napoleon of the orchestra"; Alan Sanders writes, "his treatment of the orchestra was autocratic. In later years his behaviour became extreme, and there are extraordinary stories of abusive verbal exchanges between him and his players at rehearsal". Berta Geissmar records an incident in 1938 when Mengelberg rehearsed the London Philharmonic Orchestra in the "Vorspiel und Liebestod" from Tristan und Isolde and he gave them tortuous lectures as though they had never seen the music before.

=== World War II and aftermath ===
Mengelberg's wife died in 1943. The most controversial aspect of Mengelberg's biography centers on his actions and behaviour during the years of the Nazi occupation of the Netherlands between 1940 and 1945. His biographer Frits Zwart wrote, for Radio Nederland, of an "interview Mengelberg had given with the Völkischer Beobachter, the German Nazi newspaper...the gist of it was that, on hearing of the Dutch surrender to the German invaders on 10 May 1940, he had brought a toast with a glass of champagne [and] had also spoken about the close bond existing between the Netherlands and Germany." Zwart also notes that Mengelberg conducted in Germany and in German-occupied countries throughout the war, and was photographed in the company of Nazis such as Arthur Seyss-Inquart.

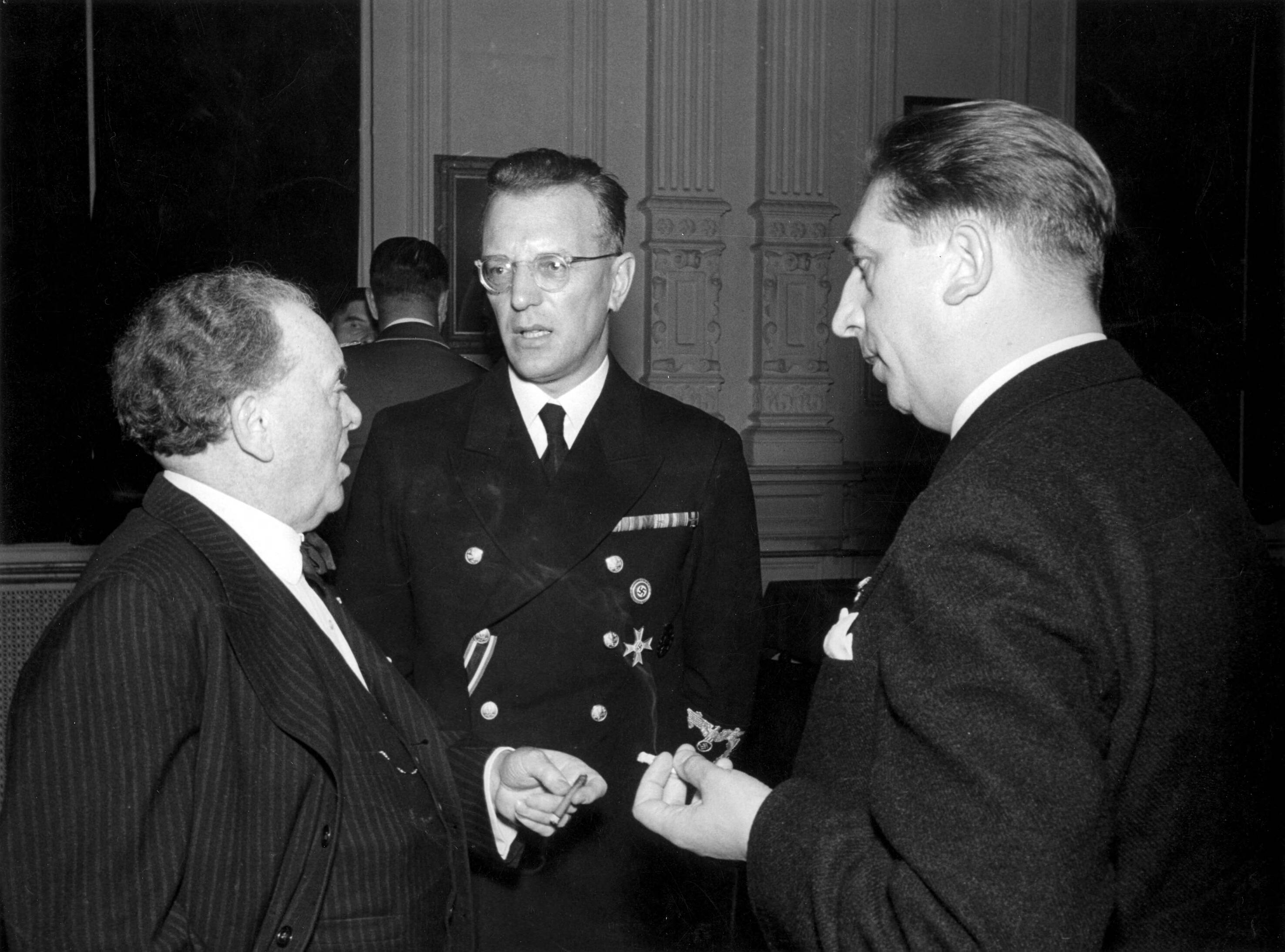
Mengelberg (left) with Reichskommissar Seyss-Inquart (1942)

Explanations have ranged from political naiveté in general, to a general "blind spot" for criticism of anything German, given his own ancestry. After the war, in 1945, the Netherlands' Honour Council (Ereraad) for Music banned him from conducting in the Netherlands for life. In 1947, after his lawyers appealed, the council reduced his ban to six years. Also in 1947, Queen Wilhelmina withdrew his Gold Medal of Honor. This notwithstanding, he continued to draw a pension from the orchestra until 1949, when the city council of Amsterdam cut off the pension. Mengelberg retreated in exile to Zuort, Sent, Switzerland, where he remained until his death in 1951, just two months before the expiration of his exile order.

Zwart wrote a two-volume biography of Mengelberg, published in Dutch in 1999 (1st volume) and in 2016 (2nd volume), with an English translation published in 2019. The 2021 documentary film De lijst van Mengelberg states that Mengelberg clearly held political sympathies favourable to the National Socialist regime and ideology, as indicated by the presence of copies at Mengelberg's villa in Switzerland of such publications as the Völkischer Beobachter which had handwritten comments in the margins of the newspapers, some of the comments laudatory. The documentary also notes that Mengelberg wrote letters to the occupying authorities to attempt to prevent the deportation of up to 48 musicians and people of Jewish background to the Westerbork transit camp. In 1943, the authorities ceased consideration of Mengelberg's requests, having noticed the high frequency of his communications of behalf of Dutch Jewish citizens. 34 of the people for whom Mengelberg advocated avoided deportation to Westerbork and survived the occupation and the war, including 13 musicians of the Concertgebouw Orchestra and Sara Bosmans-Benedicts, mother of Henriëtte Bosmans.

At the 1945 Ereraad hearing, the council described these actions by Mengelberg as him acting in "self-interest". The Dutch veterinarian Aat Tromp, whose father Sam Tromp was one of the Jewish musicians of the Concertgebouw Orchestra on whose behalf Mengelberg communicated to the authorities and who had received protective treatment, has commented in the documentary:

"Mengelberg redde het leven van mijn familie. We zitten hier als overlevenden door hem. Kan je over iemand die je leven heeft gered, zeggen dat hij fout was? Hij was politiek gezien fout, maar hij heeft niemand vermoord. Hij heeft mensen gered. Dus om te zeggen: 'Je bent een oorlogsmisdadiger', dat lijkt mij niet terecht."

("Mengelberg saved my family's life. We sit here as survivors because of him. Can you say about someone who saved your life that he was wrong? He was wrong politically, but he didn't kill anyone. He saved people. So to say, 'You are a war criminal', that doesn't seem right to me.")

== Performance style ==
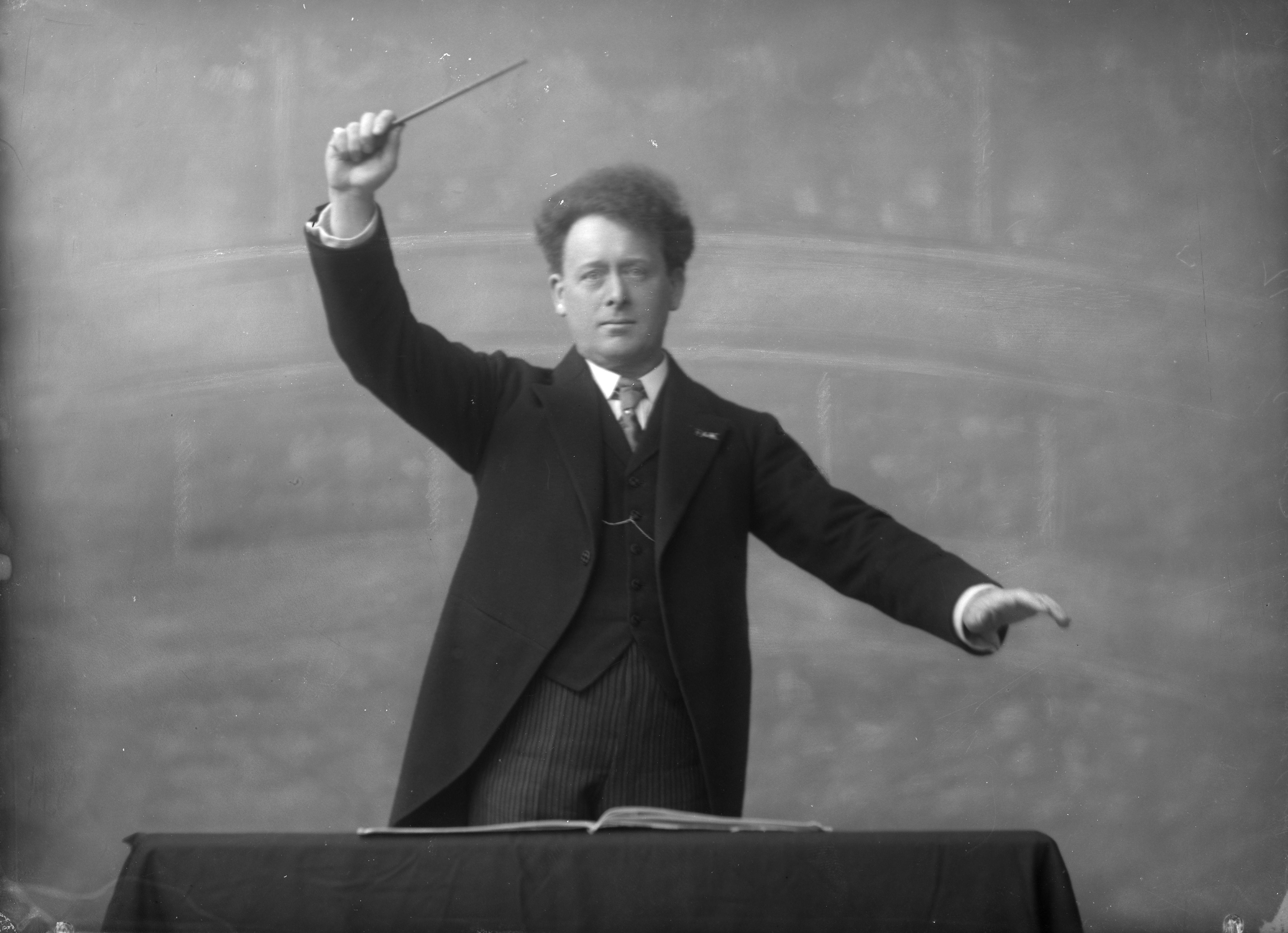
Mengelberg (1919)

The New Grove Dictionary of Music and Musicians (1980) entry on Mengelberg describes him as a "martinet addicted to meticulous and voluble rehearsals"; it also notes that he did not hesitate to make what he called changements to a composer's scores when he felt it would aid clarity.

Mengelberg's recordings with the Concertgebouw Orchestra are marked by frequent use of an unusually prominent portamento, the sliding of the string players' left fingers from one note to another. The scholar Robert Philip has shown that Mengelberg's recordings with other orchestras do not show this portamento, and that "the unusual approach to portamento... was a stylistic feature which he developed with [the Concertgebouw] over a long period of rehearsal, and that it was not a style which could be transferred to other orchestras when Mengelberg visited them". Philip also notes that this portamento required the strings to use uniform fingering prescribed by Mengelberg, and that this was also unusual for the time, when much orchestral fingering was typically "free", with different players fingering a passage differently. Freely bowed portamento sounded lighter than that we hear in Mengelberg's recordings, as not all players would slide on the same notes. Philip mentions recordings by the Vienna Philharmonic under Bruno Walter as examples of this style.

In addition, Mengelberg employed fluctuations of tempo that were extreme even in an era in which tempo fluctuation was more common than in modern practice. While admirers of Mengelberg value his tempo inflections, detractors have criticized them. For example, the musicologist and music theorist Walter Frisch has argued that "in the Brahms performances recorded by Willem Mengelberg, tempo fluctuation too often tends to obscure the broader shape of a passage or movement". Frisch argues that this obscuring of structure does not result from the tempo fluctuations of two conductors he admires who also used much tempo inflection, Wilhelm Furtwängler and Hermann Abendroth.

== Recorded legacy ==
Mengelberg made commercial recordings in the United States with the New York Philharmonic for Victor (1922–30) and Brunswick (1926–27). In Amsterdam with the Concertgebouw Orchestra he made a series of records issued in various countries on the Columbia and Odeon labels (1926–32) as well as two works recorded for the Dutch branch of Decca in 1935. Mengelberg recorded with the Concertgebouw Orchestra and the Berlin Philharmonic for Telefunken (1937–42). After his death, Philips issued recordings of live performances recorded by Dutch radio services, and these have been reissued by Decca.

In addition to his recordings of Richard Strauss's Ein Heldenleben and Don Juan, Mengelberg left discs of symphonies by Beethoven, Tchaikovsky and Brahms, Bach's St Matthew Passion, Gustav Mahler's Symphony No. 4 and the Adagietto from Symphony No. 5.

His most characteristic performances are marked by expressiveness and free tempo, perhaps most prominent in his recording of Mahler's Fourth Symphony but also present in the aforementioned St Matthew Passion and other performances as well. These qualities, shared by a handful of other conductors of the era of sound recording, such as Wilhelm Furtwängler and Leonard Bernstein, make much of his work controversial among classical music listeners.

Many of his recorded performances, including some live concerts in Amsterdam during World War II, have been reissued on LP and CD. While he was known for his recordings of the German repertoire, Capitol Records issued a powerful, nearly high fidelity recording of César Franck's Symphony in D minor, recorded in the 1940s by Telefunken with the Concertgebouw Orchestra.

Due to the Dutch government's six-year ban on Mengelberg's conducting activities, he made no more recordings after 1945. Some of his performances in Amsterdam were recorded on the innovative German tape recorder, the Magnetophon, resulting in unusually high fidelity for the time.

Sound films of Mengelberg conducting the Concertgebouw Orchestra, during live concerts in Amsterdam, have survived; among these are a 1931 performance of Weber's Oberon overture. His 1939 recording of Bach's St Matthew Passion, while not captured on film, was created on a Philips optical system which used film as the (audio-only) recording medium.
