= Otto Mengelberg =

German painter

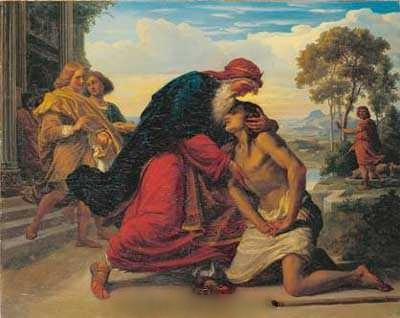
Return of the Prodigal Son

Otto Heinrich Mengelberg (April 1817, Cologne - 28 May 1890, Düsseldorf) was a German religious, portrait, and history painter, associated with the Düsseldorfer Malerschule.

== Life and work ==
He was the second son of the portrait painter, Egidius Mengelberg and his wife, Anne Lisette née Risse, of Elberfeld. His birth came a few months after their formal marriage, which was delayed due to her parents' objections to marrying a Catholic. After attending the Dreikönigsgymnasium, a Jesuit school, he studied at the Kunstakademie Düsseldorf from 1834 to 1842. His primary instructors were Karl Ferdinand Sohn and Friedrich Wilhelm von Schadow. During that time, in 1840, he converted to Protestantism. Upon graduating, he went to Munich with his friend and colleague, Joseph Fay; returning to Cologne in 1844.

Later, he assisted Fay in painting the Elberfeld Town Hall; which is now the Von der Heydt Museum. He and Fay also collaborated on the designs for the restoration of the windows at the Basilica of St. Cunibert. In 1848, he went to Düsseldorf, to hold an exhibition, and settled there permanently. There, he focused on religious scenes and altarpieces, inspired by the aesthetics of the Nazarene movement.

His commitment to providing what he felt were the proper forms of art for Protestant churches culminated in a lecture he presented in 1851 at an Elberfeld church congress. In it, he derided the decorations in Catholic churches since the Reformation as "digusting and Jesuitical", and criticized Protestants for being indifferent to the issue. With the goal of rectifying that situation, he proposed creating an "Association for Religious Art in the Protestant Church". After a lively discussion, the conference members voted to establish an evangelical art association.

He also gave private lessons; mostly to Protestant Scandinavian artists. His best-known students include Peter Nicolai Arbo, Johanne Mathilde Dietrichson, Alexandra Frosterus-Såltin, Erik Johan Löfgren and Victorine Nordenswan.

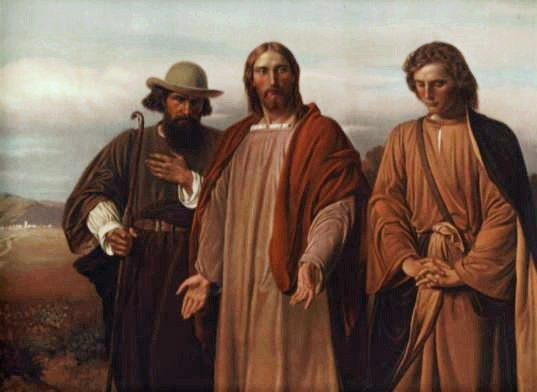
On the Road to Emmaus
