= List of bishops and archbishops of Utrecht =

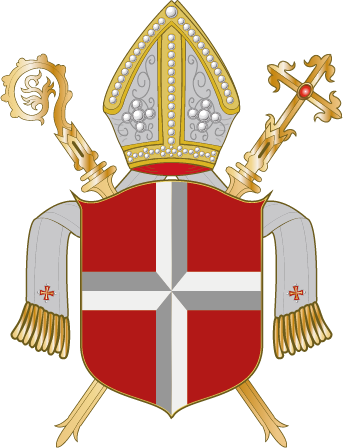
Coat of arms of the Roman Catholic Archdiocese of Utrecht.

List of bishops and archbishops of the diocese and archdioceses of Utrecht.

== Medieval diocese from 695 to 1580 ==
=== Founders of the Utrecht diocese ===
- 695 – 739: Willibrord
- 739 – 754: Boniface
- 739 – 752-753: Wera of Utrecht
- 753 – 754: Eoban
- 754 – 775: Gregory of Utrecht

=== Bishops ===
- 775 – 784: Alberic I
- 784 – 790: Theodard
- 790 – 806: Hamacarus
- 806 – 815-816: Ricfried
- 815-816–834-838: Frederick of Utrecht
- 834-848 – 845: Alberic II
- 845 – 845: Eginhard
- c. 848 – 854: Liudger of Utrecht
- 854 – 866: Hunger of Utrecht
- 866 – 899: Adalbold I
- 899-900 – 917: Radboud of Utrecht
- 917-918–975-976: Balderic of Utrecht
- 976 – 990: Folcmar
- 991 – 995: Baldwin I
- 995 – 1010: Ansfried of Utrecht
- 1010 – 1026: Adalbold II of Utrecht
- 1026-1027 – 1054: Bernold
- 1054 – 1076: William I
- 1076 – 1099: Conrad
- 1100 – 1112: Burchard
- 1112 – 1114:
- 1114 – 1127: Godbald
- 1127-1128 – 1139: Andreas van Cuijk
- 1139 – 1150: Hartbert
- 1151 – 1156: Herman van Horne
- 1156 – 1178: Godfrey van Rhenen
- 1178 – 1196: Baldwin II van Holland
- 1196 – 1197: Arnold I van Isenburg
- 1197 – 1197: Dirk I van Holland
- 1197-1198 – 1212: Dirk van Are (Note: Theodericus de Neunar in Eubel (1913a).)
- 1212 – 1215: Otto I (bishop of Utrecht) (Note: Otto de Geldern in Eubel (1913a).)
- 1216 – 1227: Otto II van Lippe
- 1227 – 1233: Wilbrand van Oldenburg
- 1233 – 1249: Otto III van Holland
- 1249 – 1250: Gozewijn van Randerath
- 1250-1252 – 1267: Henry I van Vianden
- 1267 – 1290: John I, Bishop-Elect of Utrecht (Note: Jan van Nassau was not consecrated as bishop and he remained as bishop-elect.)
- 1290 – 1296: John II van Sierck
- 1296 – 1301: Willem II Berthout
- 1301 – 1317: Guy of Avesnes
- 1317 – 1322: Frederik II van Sierck
- 1322 – 1322: Jacob van Oudshoorn
- 1322 – 1340: Jan III van Diest
- 1340 – 1342:
- 1342 – 1364: John of Arkel
- 1364 – 1371: Jan van Virneburg
- 1371 – 1379: Arnold II van Horne
- 1379 – 1393: Floris van Wevelinkhoven
- 1393 – 1423: Frederick of Blankenheim
- 1423 – 1455: Rudolf van Diepholt
  - 1425 – 1433: Zweder van Culemborg, rival bishop
  - 1434 – 1448: Walraven van Meurs, rival bishop
- 1448 – 1455:
- 1455 – 1456: Gijsbrecht van Brederode
- 1456 – 1496: David of Burgundy
- 1496 – 1517: Frederick IV of Baden
- 1517 – 1524: Philip of Burgundy
- 1524 – 1529: Henry of the Palatinate
- 1529 – 1534: Willem van Enckevoirt
- 1534 – 1559: George van Egmond

=== Archbishops ===
- 1559 – 1559: Adriaan van Renesse van Wulven (Note: Not listed in Eubel et al. (1923).)
  Nominated, but he died before his appointment could be confirmed by the Pope
- 1559 – 1580: Frederik V Schenck van Toutenburg
- 1580 – 1592: Herman van Rennenberg
  archbishop-designate but was not installed and did not take possession because of Protestant opposition.
- 1592 – 1600: Jan van Bruhesen
  archbishop-designate but was not installed and did not take possession because of Protestant opposition.

== Roman Catholic archdiocese since 1853 ==
=== Archbishops ===
- Johannes Zwijsen (1853–1868)
- Andreas Ignatius Schaepman (1868–1882)
- Petrus Matthias Snickers (1883–1895)
- Henricus van de Wetering (1895–1929)
- Johannes Henricus Gerardus Jansen (1930–1936)
- Johannes de Jong (1936–1955)
- Bernardus Johannes Alfrink (1955–1975)
- Johannes Gerardus Maria Willebrands (1975–1983)
- Adrianus Johannes Simonis (1983–2007)
- Willem Jacobus Eijk (since 2007)

=== Auxiliary bishops ===
- Goswin Haex van Loenhout, O. Carm. (15 May 1469 – 31 Mar 1475)
- Godefridus Yerwerd, O.S.B. (28 Mar 1476 – Jan 1483)
- Bonaventura Engelbertz van Oldenzeel, O.F.M. (30 Oct 1538 – 1539)
- Nicolas Van Nienlant (6 Jul 1541 –)
- Theodorus Gerardus Antonius Hendriksen (21 Jan 1961 – 9 Sep 1969)
- Johannes Bernardus Niënhaus (15 Jan 1982 – 1 Sep 1999)
- Johannes Antonius de Kok, O.F.M. (15 Jan 1982 – 27 Aug 2005)
- Gerard Johannes Nicolaus de Korte (11 Apr 2001 – 18 Jun 2008)
- Theodorus Cornelis Maria Hoogenboom 7 Dec 2009 –)
- Herman Willebrordus Woorts (7 Dec 2009 –)

== Old Catholic archdiocese since 1723 ==
=== Archbishops ===
- Cornelius van Steenoven (1723–1725)
- Cornelius Johannes Barchman Wuytiers (1725–1733)
- Theodorus van der Croon (1734–1739)
- Petrus Johannes Meindaerts (1739–1767)
- Walter van Nieuwenhuisen (1768–1797)
- Johannes Jacobus van Rhijn (1797–1808)
- Willibrord van Os (1814–1825)
- Johannes van Santen (1825–1858)
- Henricus Loos (1858–1873)
- Johannes Heijkamp (1875–1892)
- Gerardus Gul (1892–1920)
- Franciscus Kenninck (1920–1937)
- Andreas Rinkel (1937–1970)
- Marinus Kok (1970–1982)
- Antonius Jan Glazemaker (1982–2000)
- Joris Vercammen (2000–2020)
- Bernd Wallet (2020–present)

== Bibliography ==
- Eubel, Conrad, ed. (1913a). "Trajecten al. Ultrajecten". Hierarchia catholica medii aevi (in Latin). Vol. 1 (Altera ed.). Monasterii: Sumptibus et Typis Librariae Regensbergianae. pp. 490–491. OCLC 870504436. OL 23303362M.
- Eubel, Conrad, ed. (1913b). "Trajecten". Hierarchia catholica medii aevi (in Latin). Vol. 2 (Altera ed.). Monasterii: Sumptibus et Typis Librariae Regensbergianae. p. 253. OCLC 870504436. OL 23303362M.
- Eubel, Conrad; Gulik, Wilhelm van; Schmitz-Kallenberg, Ludwig A., eds. (1923). "Trajecten". Hierarchia catholica medii aevi (in Latin). Vol. 3. Monasterii: Sumptibus et typis Librariae Regensbergianae. p. 316. OCLC 870504436.
