= Andreas Ignatius Schaepman =

Dutch Catholic archbishop (1815–1882)

- Archbishop of Utrecht
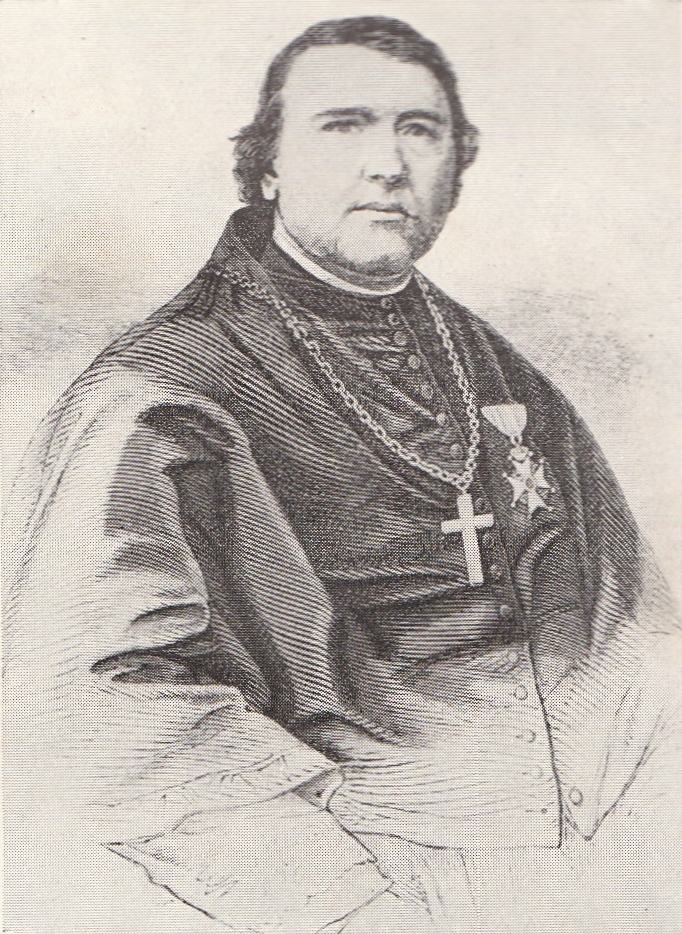
- Church: Catholic Church
- Archdiocese: Archdiocese of Utrecht
- In office: 4 February 1868 – 19 September 1882
- Predecessor: Johannes Zwijsen
- Successor: Petrus Matthias Snickers
- Previous posts: Coadjutor Archbishop of Utrecht (1862-1868); Titular Bishop of Esbus (1860-1868); Auxiliary Bishop of Utrecht (1860-1862)

Orders
- Consecration: 26 August 1860 by Franciscus Jacobus van Vree

Personal details
- Born: 4 September 1815 Zwolle, Overijssel, United Kingdom of the Netherlands
- Died: 19 September 1882 (aged 67) Utrecht, Province of Utrecht, Kingdom of the Netherlands

Mgr. Andreas Ignatius Schaepman (4 September 1815, Zwolle – 19 September 1882, Utrecht) was Archbishop of Utrecht from 1868 to 1882 and President of the Great Seminary of Rijsenburg.

He did his primary studies at the gymnasium in Oldenzaal, completed his higher studies in the Seminary of 's-Heerenberg on 10 March 1838 and was ordained a priest at Oegstgeest. First employed as a chaplain in his hometown, he was appointed pastor of Ommerschans five years later. In 1846 moved to Assen, where he stayed eight years, and was then appointed pastor in Zwolle.

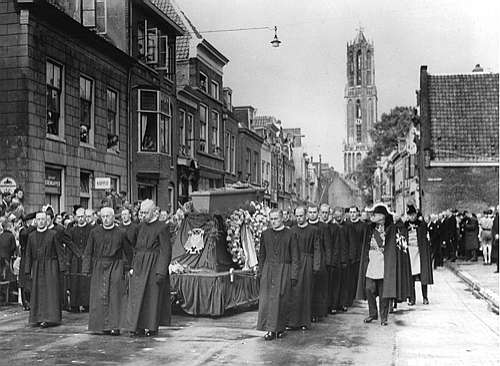
Funeral of Archbishop Schaepman at St. Maartenskerk, Utrecht

Schaepman was in 1857 the first president of the seminary Rijsenburg in Driebergen. A year later he was also appointed vicar general and on 13 July 1860 to coadjutor and bishop of Hesebon Esbus in partibus. Schaepman was ordained titular bishop of Esbus and auxiliary of Utrecht on 26 August 1860 at Rijsenburg by Franciscus Jacobus van Vree, Bishop of Haarlem. After the resignation of Msgr. Johannes Zwijsen, in 1868, he was appointed to the metropolitan see, and so became the second Archbishop of Utrecht, after the restoration of the Roman Catholic hierarchy in the country.

After the death of Archbishop Johannes Zwijsen, Schaepman campaigned for the emancipation of Catholicism in the Netherlands. He supported the establishment of Catholic schools and founded congregations such as the Brothers of Utrecht and the Sisters of St. Joseph who devoted themselves to Catholic education. Schaepman promoted religious art, music and history, that were never Zwijsen priorities. Even before his appointment as archbishop, he organized the restoration of St. Catherine Cathedral in Utrecht in neo-Gothic style, together with Gerard van Heukelum (1834-1910), founder of the St. Bernulphusgilde and chaplain of the cathedral). Schaepman and Van Heukelum were also at the basis of what is now the Museum Catharijneconvent in Utrecht.

Schaepman had favored architect Wilhelm Victor Alfred Tepe, giving him a virtual monopoly on the building of new Catholic churches in the metropolitan territories of the Archdiocese of Utrecht. Only after the death of Archbishop Schaepman in 1882, was this monopoly slightly affected, and other architects had a chance of competing.

Schaepman attended the First Vatican Council in part.

His portrait was lithographed by NJW de Roode an unknown artist.

Catholic Church titles
| Preceded by Johannes Zwijsen | Archbishop of Utrecht; 1868–1882 | Succeeded by Petrus Matthias Snickers |
