= Johannes de Jong =

Dutch Catholic cardinal (1885–1955)

His Eminence Johannes de Jong
- Cardinal, Archbishop of Utrecht; Primate of the Netherlands
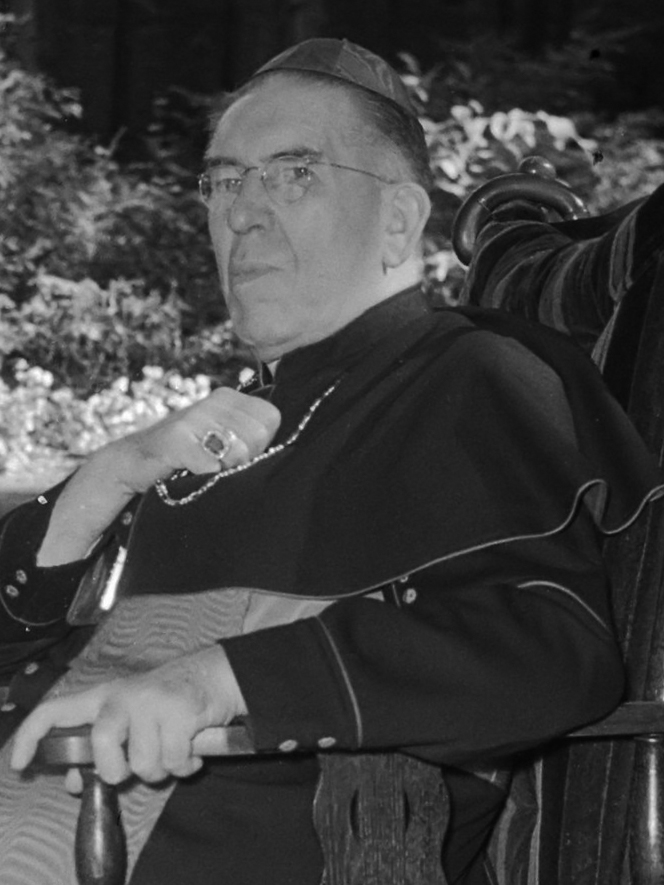
- Jan de Jong (1953)
- Archdiocese: Utrecht
- Installed: 6 February 1936
- Term ended: 8 September 1955
- Predecessor: Johannes Henricus Gerardus Jansen
- Successor: Bernardus Johannes Alfrink

Orders
- Ordination: 15 August 1908
- Consecration: 12 September 1935 by Pieter Hopmans
- Created cardinal: 18 February 1946 by Pius XII
- Rank: Cardinal-Priest

Personal details
- Born: Johannes de Jong; 10 September 1885 Nes, Netherlands
- Died: 8 September 1955 (aged 69) Amersfoort, Netherlands
- Buried: St. Barbara's Cemetery Utrecht, Netherlands
- Denomination: Roman Catholic
- Coat of arms

Johannes de Jong (September 10, 1885 – September 8, 1955) was a Dutch Cardinal of the Roman Catholic Church. He served as Archbishop of Utrecht from 1936 until his death, and was elevated to the cardinalate in 1946 by Pope Pius XII.

== Early life and ordination ==
Johannes de Jong was born in Nes, a village on the island of Ameland, as the eldest of nine children of Jan de Jong, a baker, and his wife Trijntje Mosterman. After attending the minor seminary in Culemborg from 1898 to 1904, de Jong then studied at the Seminary of Rijsenburg for four years.

He was ordained to the priesthood on August 15, 1908, and further studied at the Pontifical Gregorian University and the Angelicum in Rome, obtaining his doctorates in philosophy and theology. His two youngest brothers, Julius (1896-1923) and Wiebren (1898-1962) were also priests.

== Priest ==
De Jong did pastoral work in Amersfoort, including work with the Sisters of Mercy, until 1914, when he was made a professor at the Rijsenburg seminary on November 6. Becoming the seminary's rector on August 14, 1931, he was named a canon of the cathedral of Utrecht in 1933.

== Bishop and Archbishop ==
On August 3, 1935, de Jong was appointed Coadjutor Archbishop of Utrecht and Titular Archbishop of Rhusium. He received his episcopal consecration on the following September 12 from Bishop Pieter Hopmans, with Bishops Arnold Diepen and Johannes Smit serving as co-consecrators, in St. Catherine's Cathedral. De Jong succeeded Johannes Henricus Gerardus Jansen as Archbishop of Utrecht and thus Primate of the Netherlands. He was also the first archbishop in the Netherlands with a university degree since the restoration of the Dutch Catholic hierarchy in the middle of the 19th century.

He said he didn't want to be another Theodor Innitzer, his colleague in Vienna with fascist sympathies. De Jong ordered his priests to refuse the sacraments to Nazi Dutchmen. During the Second World War, he was one of the major leaders against the Nazi occupation of Netherlands. On July 26, 1942 Dutch bishops, including Archbishop Johannes de Jong, issued a decree that openly condemned Nazi deportations of Dutch workers and Jews. The Nazis retaliated by seizing 245 Catholics of Jewish descent, including Edith Stein. The Vatican used the Netherlands' experience to explain its silence during the years of the Holocaust. After the German retaliation, Sister Pasqualina Lehnert, Pius XII's housekeeper and confidante, said the Pope was convinced that while the Bishop’s protest cost more than two hundred lives, a protest by him would mean at least two hundred thousand innocent lives that he was not ready to sacrifice. While politicians, generals, and dictators might gamble with the lives of people, a Pope could not.

== Cardinal ==
Styles of Johannes de Jong
- Reference style: His Eminence
- Spoken style: Your Eminence
- Informal style: Cardinal
- See: Utrecht

De Jong was created Cardinal-Priest of S. Clemente by Pope Pius XII in the consistory of February 18, 1946, but could not travel to Rome for the ceremony as he was recovering from a car accident. However, on October 12 of that year, the Dutch prelate went to Castel Gandolfo to receive his red hat from Pope Pius. In 1951, de Jong, who was the first resident Dutch cardinal since the Protestant Reformation, had to leave the administration of the archdiocese to his coadjutor, Bernardus Johannes Alfrink. Meanwhile, de Jong retired to the same house where he had lived during his early priestly ministry in Amersfoort.

== Death ==
De Jong died in his sleep after a long illness in Amersfoort, two days before his 70th birthday. He is buried at St. Barbara cemetery in the court of St. Catherine's Cathedral.

Catholic Church titles
Preceded by Johannes Henricus Gerardus Jansen	Archbishop of Utrecht; 1936–1955	Succeeded by Bernardus Johannes Alfrink
