= Anton Schaars =

Dutch Roman Catholic priest

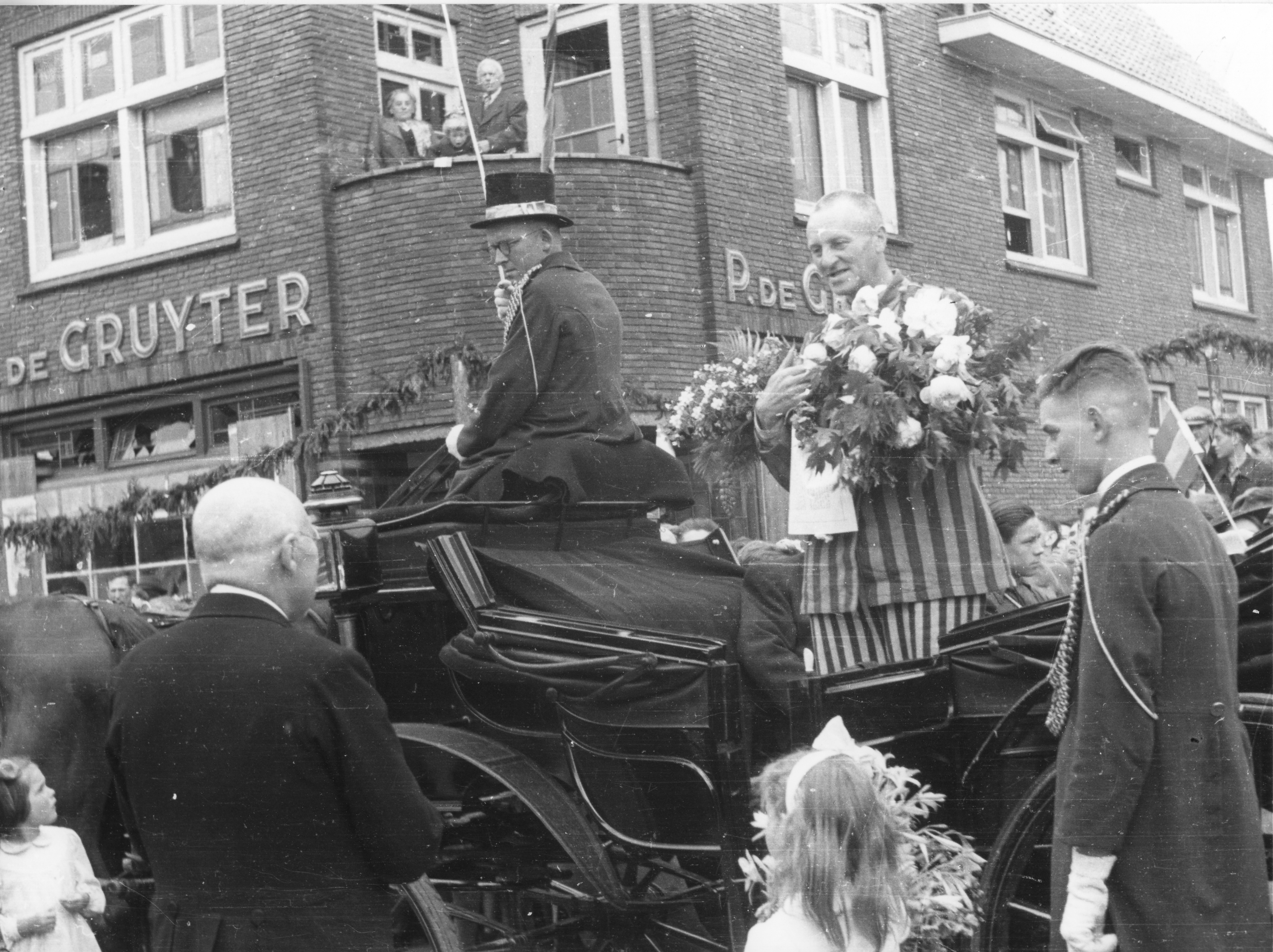
- Anton Schaars is welcomed back in Velp in 1945, wearing his camp clothing.
- Born: June 5, 1887; Deventer, Netherlands
- Died: February 4, 1963 (aged 75); Deventer, Netherlands
- Occupation: Roman Catholic priest
- Known for: Resistance work during World War II

Antonius (Anton) Johannes Schaars (5 June 1887, in Deventer – 4 February 1963, in Deventer) was a Dutch Roman Catholic priest who helped rescue members of the Allied forces during World War II.

== Early life ==
Schaars was born in Deventer in 1887. He followed his secondary education at the Canisius College in Nijmegen before studying at the minor seminary in Culemborg and the major seminary in Rijsenburg. In August 1910 he was ordained priest by archbishop Henricus van de Wetering of Utrecht.

He worked as curate in Ameland, Hengelo, Heino, Arnhem and Zeist. After which he worked for 10 years as parson in Doornik, where he helped found a catholic primary school. In 1937 Schaars was appointed parson in Velp.

== World War II ==
Schaars saw the danger of Nazism and preached against it. In 1940, after the Netherlands became occupied by Nazi Germany, he created an escape route for escaped French prisoners of war, together with the married couple Timmermans. He also helped crashed allied pilots and Jewish people in hiding. Together with communist Dirk van der Voort he published a 1942 manifest calling the farmers to destroy their harvest as a form of resistance.

The Germans became aware of the escape route and both Schaars and the couple Timmermans were arrested on 5 May 1942. He was held for two months at the Oranjehotel prison in Scheveningen, before being transported to first Kamp Amersfoort, followed by Herzogenbusch concentration camp, and finally Dachau concentration camp. He was transferred to Natzweiler in October 1943, and returned to Dachau in September 1944. He stayed in Dachau until it was liberated on 29 April 1945. On his return to Velp on 26 May 1945 Schaars, dressed in camp clothing, was driven through town in an open chariot.

== Later life ==
Schaars would continue his work as parson in Velp until his retirement in 1956. He died in 1963 and was originally buried at the Heiderust cemetery in Rheden. In 2016 he was reburied at the Bergweg cemetery in Velp.

== Legacy ==
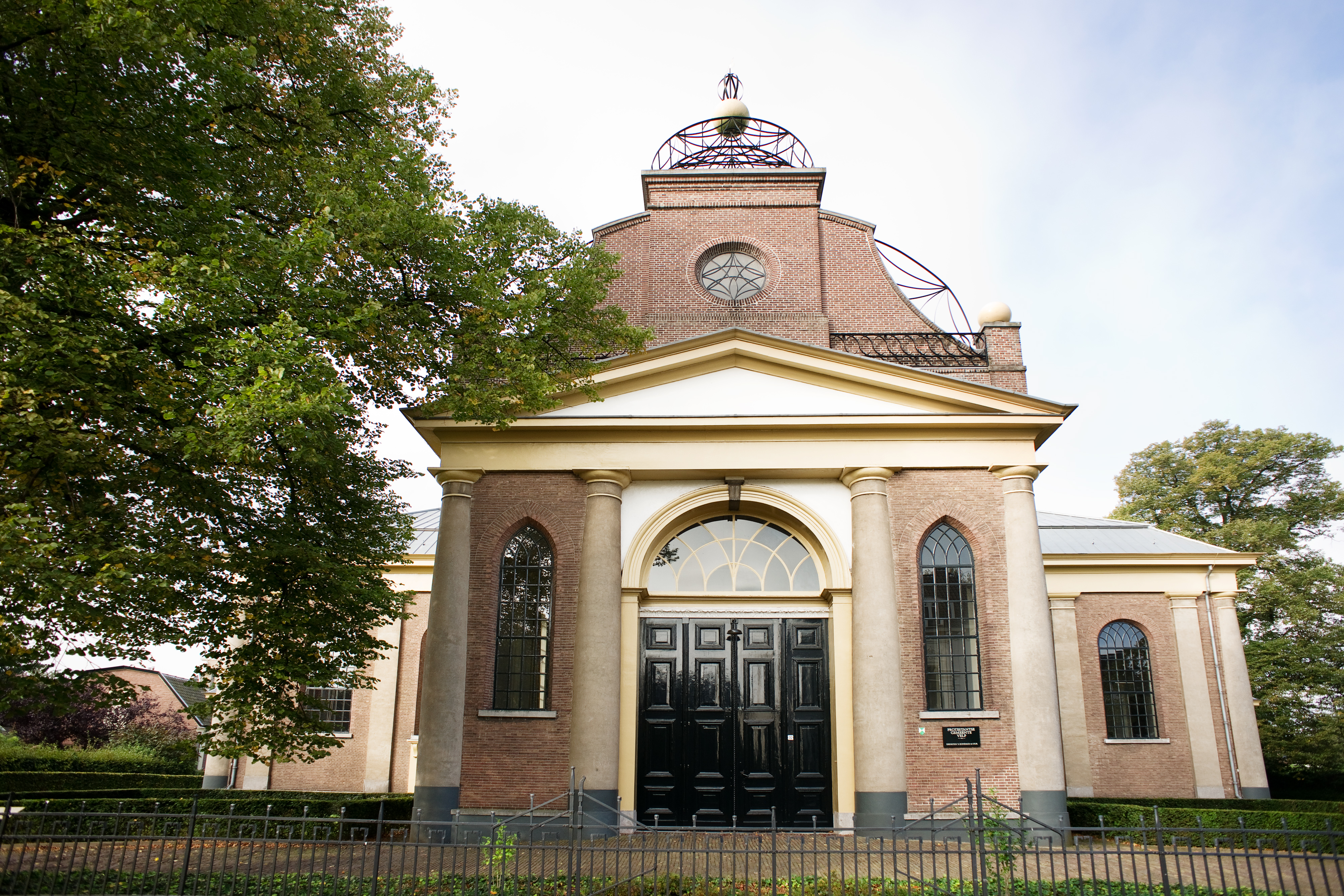
Protestant church in Velp, where windows bear the image of catholic parson Anton Schaars

After the war in 1950 he was awarded the Légion d'honneur and Croix de guerre by France.

At his retirement as parson of Velp he was offered the honorary medal in silver of the municipality of Rheden. The street Pastoor Schaarsstraat (English: Pastor Schaars street) in Velp is named after him.

Two photographs of his return to Velp, and being welcomed by Dutch Reformed Church minister Adriaan Oskamp, are part of two windows of the Protestant church Waterstaatskerk in Velp.

== Literature ==
- Hengeveld-de Jong, G. (2013). Verborgen in Velp. Nooit vertelde verhalen over moed, verzet en onderduikers (in Dutch). Velp: Stichting Velp voor Oranje. ISBN 978-90-81058-20-9.
