= Bernardus Johannes Alfrink =

Dutch Catholic cardinal (1900–1987)

His Eminence Bernardus Johannes Alfrink
- Cardinal, Archbishop of Utrecht; Primate of the Netherlands
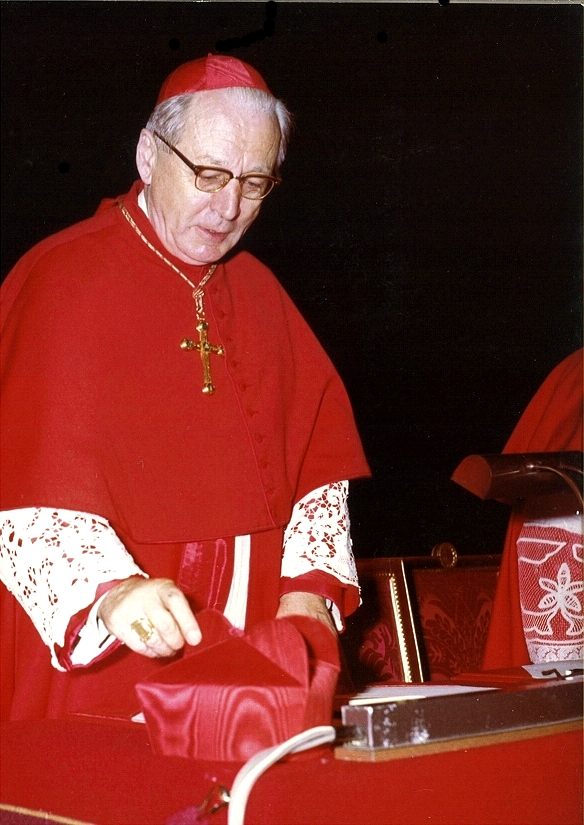
- Church: Latin Church
- Archdiocese: Utrecht
- Installed: 31 October 1955
- Term ended: 6 December 1975
- Predecessor: Johannes de Jong
- Successor: Johannes Willebrands

Orders
- Ordination: 15 August 1924 by Henricus van de Wetering
- Consecration: 17 July 1951 by Paolo Giobbe
- Created cardinal: 28 March 1960 by John XXIII
- Rank: Cardinal Priest

Personal details
- Born: 5 July 1900 Nijkerk, Netherlands
- Died: 17 December 1987 (aged 87) Nieuwegein, Netherlands
- Buried: Saint Catherine's Cathedral, Utrecht, Netherlands
- Denomination: Roman Catholic
- Motto: EVANGELIZARE DIVITIAS CHRISTI

Bernardus Johannes Alfrink (5 July 1900 – 17 December 1987) was a Dutch Cardinal of the Roman Catholic Church. He served as Archbishop of Utrecht from 1955 to 1975, and was elevated to the cardinalate in 1960.

== Biography ==
Coat of arms of cardinal Bernardus Alfrink.

Born in Nijkerk, Bernardus Johannes Alfrink was the youngest son of Theodorus Johannes Alfrink and his wife, Elisabeth Catharina Ossenvoort. His mother died in 1901 at the birth of his two younger twin sisters (both of whom also died after a few months), after which Bernardus was cared for by a childless aunt from neighboring Barneveld for the next three years. The priest who baptized him was Father Johannes Verstege. Alfrink received his first Communion in 1911.

After attending the minor seminary in Culemborg, he enrolled in the seminary at Rijsenburg, and, eventually attended the Pontifical Biblical Institute in Rome. He was ordained to the priesthood on 15 August 1924 by Archbishop Henricus van de Wetering. He completed his studies at the École Biblique in Jerusalem in 1930, the same year he was appointed chaplain in Maarssen. He also did pastoral work in Utrecht until 1933. Alfrink taught at the Seminary of Rijsenburg (1933–1945) and later the Catholic University of Nijmegen (1945–1951).

On 28 May 1951, he was appointed Coadjutor Archbishop of Utrecht and Titular Archbishop of Tyana. Alfrink received his episcopal consecration on the following 17 July from Archbishop Paolo Giobbe, papal internuncio in The Hague, with Bishops Willem Lemmens and Jan Smit serving as co-consecrators, in Saint Catherine's Cathedral.

Alfrink succeeded Cardinal Johannes de Jong as Archbishop of Utrecht on 31 October 1955 and was named Apostolic vicar of the Catholic Military vicariate of the Netherlands on 16 April 1957. He contributed to scientific publications, led the Pax Christi movement in the Netherlands, and was created Cardinal-Priest of San Gioacchino ai Prati di Castello by Pope John XXIII in the consistory of 28 March 1960.

From 1962 to 1965, the Dutch primate participated at the Second Vatican Council, and sat on its Board of Presidency. During one session of the council, Alfrink had Cardinal Alfredo Ottaviani's microphone turned off after the latter exceeded his time limit.

Alfrink was one of the cardinal electors in the 1963 papal conclave, which selected Pope Paul VI. Along with Cardinal Giovanni Colombo, he assisted Cardinal Achille Liénart in delivering one of the closing messages of the council on 8 December 1965.

After the first meeting between Church and Freemasonry which had been held on 11 April 1969 at the convent of the Divine Master in Ariccia, he was the protagonist of a series of public handshakes between high prelates of the Roman Catholic Church and the heads of Freemasonry. In 1970, he led the Dutch Pastoral Council in calling for the end of the ban on married priests, and admitting women to the priesthood.

He served as President of the Episcopal Conference of the Netherlands. Resigning as Utrecht's archbishop on 6 December 1975, he later voted in the conclaves of August and October 1978, which selected Popes John Paul I and John Paul II respectively. During the last years of his life, Alfrink lived, with his housekeeper Dora, in a bungalow at Dijnselburg near Huis ter Heide. The bungalow was called "Dora et Labora" by the Cardinal. It was specifically designed for him. He reappeared in public when Pope John Paul II visited the cardinal in 1985 during a papal visit to Benelux.

Bernardus Johannes Cardinal Alfrink died in Nieuwegein at age 87, and after his funeral services in St. Catharine's Cathedral, was buried at St. Barbara's cemetery, next to his predecessor.

== Views ==
=== Aggiornamento ===
Viewed by some as a "liberal", the Cardinal once said, "It is always a good thing for the Church to move forward. It is not good if the Church comes to a standstill."

=== Edward Schillebeeckx ===
Nijmegen's Dominican theologian Edward Schillebeeckx was Alfrink's regular advisor. Alfrink supported Schillebeeckx and took the latter's condemnation as an offence to the Catholic Church in the Netherlands.

=== Royal conversion ===
Alfrink refused to respond to the Dutch Reformed Church's call for clarification in regard to Princess Irene's conversion to Catholicism in connection with her intended marriage to Prince Carlos Hugo of Bourbon-Parma.

== Awards and honors ==
In 1986, Alfrink received the Four Freedoms Award for the Freedom of Worship.

== Alfrink's bibliography ==
Thesis

- Israelitische und Babylonische Jenseitsvorstellungen. Dissertation bei der Päpstlichen Bibelkommission zur Erlangung der Doktorwürde eingereicht von Bernhard Alfrink, Priester der Erzdiözese Utrecht (Rome, 1930)

Books

- Het Boek Prediker (Brugge, 1932)
- Het boek Ecclesiasticus (Brugge, 1934)
- Epistels en evangeliën volgens het Romeinsch missaal (met G. Hartmann en P. van Grinsven, Hilversum, 1938)
- Het Passieverhaal der vier Evangelisten (Nijmegen, 1946)
- Over "typologische« exegese" van het Oude Testament (oratie, Nijmegen, 1945)
- Josue, uit de grondtekst vertaald en uitgelegd (Roermond, 1952)
- Vragen aan de Kerk: toespraken van kardinaal Alfrink in de jaren van het concilie, met een inleiding van Edward Schillebeeckx (Utrecht/Baarn, 1967)
- Vrede is meer ... – kardinaal Alfrink over oorlog en vrede Pax Christi, 1973
- Leven in de Kerk. Michel van der Plas in gesprek met Kardinaal Alfrink (Utrecht/Baarn, 1984), ISBN 9026306547

Articles

- Alfrink, Bernard (1948). De Boer, Pieter Arie Hendrik (ed.). "La Prononciation 'Jehova' du Tétragramme". Oudtestamentische Studiën. 5. Leiden: E. J. Brill: 43–62. ISSN 0169-7226.

Catholic Church titles
Preceded by Pietro Doimo Munzani	Titular Archbishop of Tyana; 28 May 1951 – 31 October 1955	Succeeded by Primo Principi
Preceded by Johannes de Jong	Archbishop of Utrecht; 31 October 1955 – 6 December 1975	Succeeded by Johannes Willebrands
New title	Apostolic vicar of the Military vicariate of the Netherlands; 1957–1975	Succeeded by Johannes Willebrands
New title	Cardinal Priest of San Gioacchino ai Prati di Castello; 28 March 1960 – 17 December 1987	Succeeded by Michele Giordano
Preceded by Maurice Feltin	International President of Pax Christi; 1965—1978	Succeeded by Luigi Bettazzi
