= Peace Urges The Churches Towards Tolerance =

17th century painting

Peace Urges the Churches to Tolerance
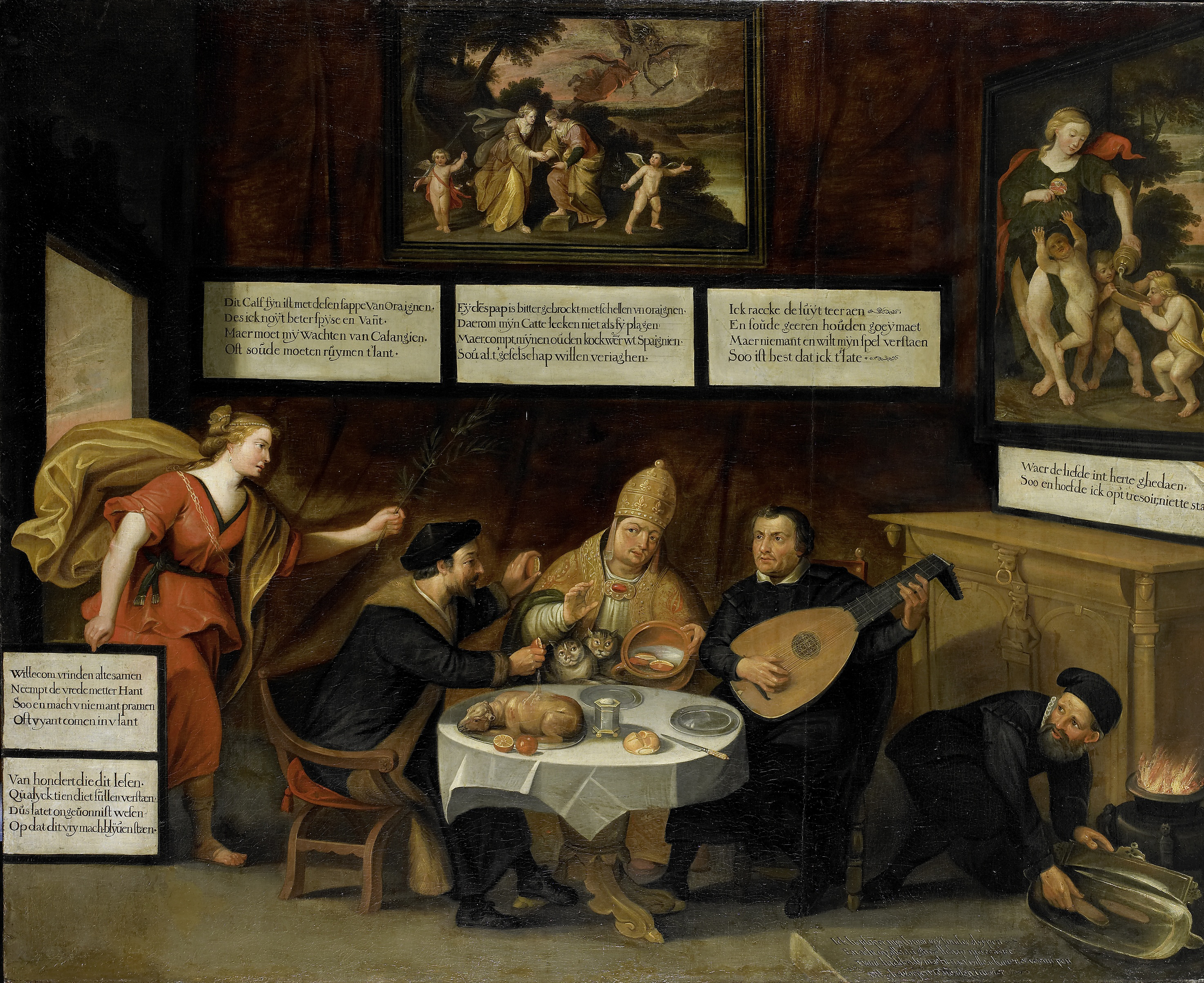
- Year: early 17th century
- Medium: canvas, oil paint
- Dimensions: 131.5 cm (51.8 in) × 162.5 cm (64.0 in)
- Location: Rijksmuseum, Museum Catharijneconvent, Netherlands
- Accession no.: SK-A-4152, RMCC s48
- Identifiers: RKDimages ID: 54575

Peace Urges The Churches Towards Tolerance (Dutch: Vrede maant de kerken tot verdraagzaamheid) is a 1600–1624 allegorical painting by an unknown artist. It was donated to the Rijksmuseum in Amsterdam in 1968 by Bosman, a Brussels-based collector for whom it had been purchased anonymously in France earlier that year. It has been on long-term loan to the Catharijneconvent Museum in Utrecht since 1977.

From left to right Jean Calvin, an unidentified pope and Martin Luther sit round a table. Luther plays a lute, whilst Calvin squeezes half an orange over his plate of lamb (symbolising the Calvinism of the House of Orange) and gives the pope the other used-up half to put in a pot. A female personification of Peace enters from the left bearing an olive branch, whilst to the right is he Anabaptist Menno Simons on all fours taking a tray of bread from the fire. Two paintings in the background show Peace and Justice (centre) and Charity and Her Children (right). Explanatory verses are also shown on the walls of the room.

== Sources ==
- https://www.rijksmuseum.nl/nl/collectie/SK-A-4152
