= St Joseph's Orphanage =

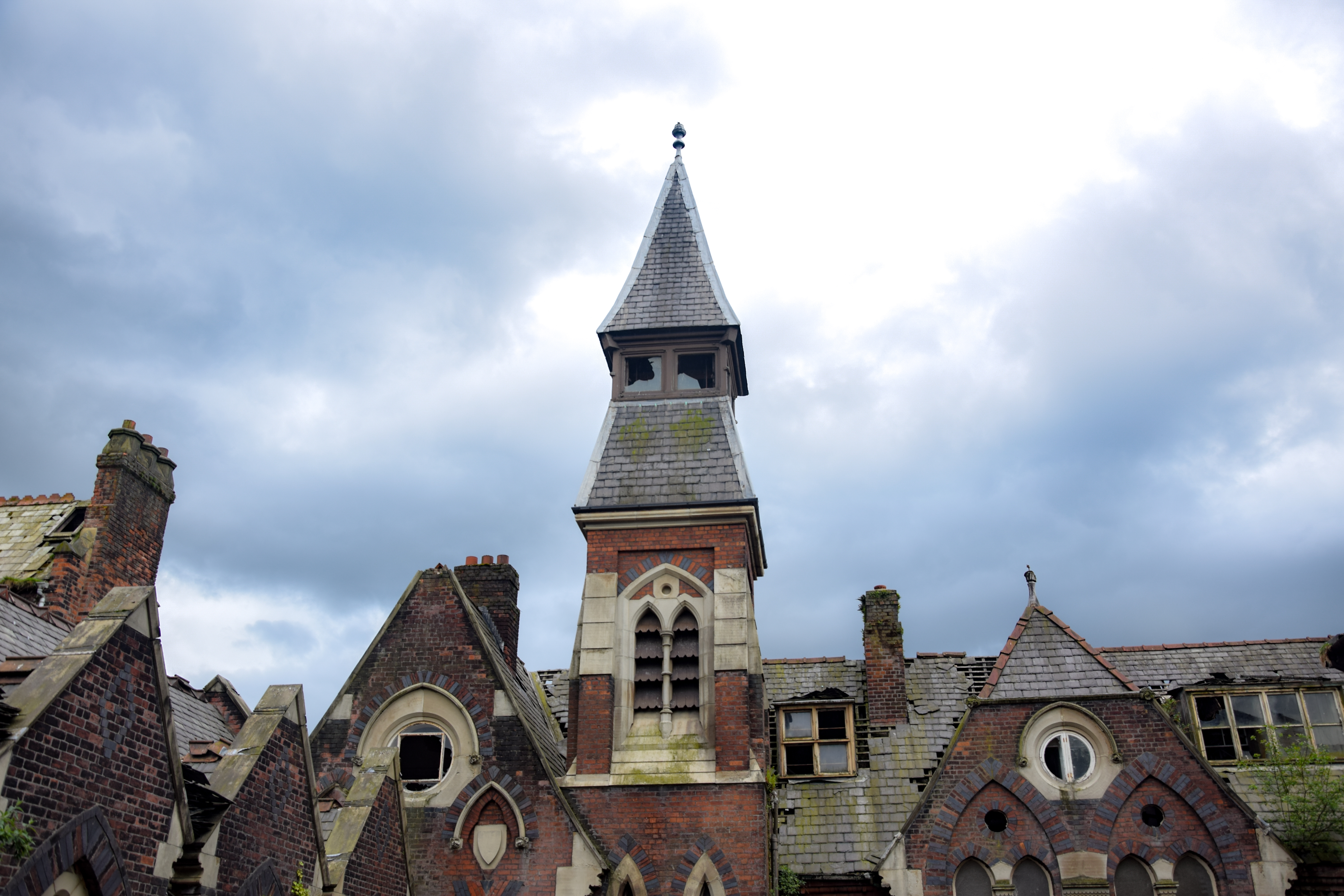

- Location within Preston city centre

General information
- Status: Derelict & undergoing redevelopment
- Type: Orphanage and hospital complex
- Architectural style: Gothic
- Location: Preston, Lancashire, England
- Coordinates: 53.75652°N 2.70405°W
- Completed: 1872
- Opened: 19 September 1872
- Closed: 2003
- Demolished: 2022 (partially)

Design and construction
- Architect: R.W Hughes
- Designations

Listed Building – Grade II
- Designated: 20 April 1988
- Reference no.: 1207336

St Joseph's Orphanage (sometimes known as Mount Street Hospital and other names) is a Grade II listed former orphanage and hospital complex in Preston, Lancashire, England. The complex is located on Theatre Street and Mount Street. The orphanage was constructed and opened in 1872 and a hospital extension was opened in 1877. In more recent years the complex was used as a private care home but that closed in 2003. The complex also includes a tower. The building later became derelict until 2022 when demolition began following redevelopment plans.

== History ==
St Joseph's Orphanage was built in 1872 and opened on 19 September that year. The site it occupies was previously occupied by an alms house. The orphanage housed and was the first welfare provider in Preston for Roman Catholic girls. The orphanage was funded by Maria Holland, a wealthy widow who was giving £10,000 at a time to fund the orphanage. Holland did this in the hope of improving Preston's poor mortality rates caused by poor housing and low-paid mill workers. The orphanage was run by Sisters of Charity of Our Lady Mother of Mercy. The orphanage cared for 971 children and could hold 60 children in two dormitories at any one time, despite the fact that the building was only designed to hold 30 children.

In 1877, St Joseph's Institute for Sick Poor (also known as Mount Street Hospital) was constructed and opened to care for the sick and poor people in Preston. In 1884, the hospital opened up two rooms for private patients. The hospital cared for British, Belgian and Dutch soldiers during World War I and World War II. Over the years, tens of thousands of babies were born at the hospitals maternity unit. An operating theatre was added to the hospital in 1910 and a chapel was added to the complex in the same year. Another wing was added to the hospital in 1933 followed by an additional one in 1958 by Princess Marina, the Duchess of Kent.

The orphanage closed in 1954. Following the closure of the orphanage, the top floor of the building was used as accommodation for the nuns who were running the adjacent hospital.

In 1982, the sisters left nursing and Mount Street Hospital closed its doors.

In the 1980s, the complex was converted into a private care home. Mount Street Care Home opened in 1988. The care home continued operation for 15 years until it closed in 2003.

== Closure ==
After the care home closed in 2003, the building fell into extensive dereliction and became the victim of vandalism and fires for many years. In 2016, the building had featured on "top most at risk historic buildings in the UK" by the Victorian Society. In 2018, a morgue was discovered at the site.

=== Fires ===
On 13 May 2022, the third floor and roof of the former orphanage caught fire. Smoke could be seen for miles and emergency services were called to the scene. The fire was extinguished and no one was injured as a result of the fire. This was one of three fires in a week that took place in Preston with two fires on two separate occasions taking place at a former cinema and nightclub complex nearby.

On 1 May 2023, a fire broke out at the former hospital. Six fire engines and two aerial ladder platforms were called to the scene. Roads were closed as a result of the fire. Lancashire Fire and Rescue Service stated that they did not believe that the fire was started deliberately, but also stated that they would carry out a full investigation.

== Future ==
In 2004, plans to convert the orphanage into 82 flats was approved but was never put into effect.

In 2019, Czero and Buttress Architects, a redevelopment company who specialises in historic buildings, submitted an application to redevelop the complex into apartments. They proposed to demolish most of the complex but keep the chapel and the tower. They also intended to build 22 apartments for over 55s with private gardens. These plans were hinted for approval in 2020.

In February 2021, plans to demolish five of the buildings and create 67 new homes was approved.

In July 2022, work began at the complex, with many of the buildings being demolished. The site began undergoing redevelopment. It is understood that the chapel and tower will not be demolished.

== Notable people ==
George Formby – English actor, singer-songwriter and comedian died at the hospital following a heart attack on 6 March 1961.

== Architecture ==
The building was designed by R.W Hughes in a gothic style. The building was made from red brick in English bond with blue brick and sandstone ashlar dressings along with a Welsh slate roof. The buildings were of two storeys with basements and attics.

== See also ==
- Listed buildings in Preston, Lancashire
