= Sisters of Charity of Our Lady Mother of Mercy =

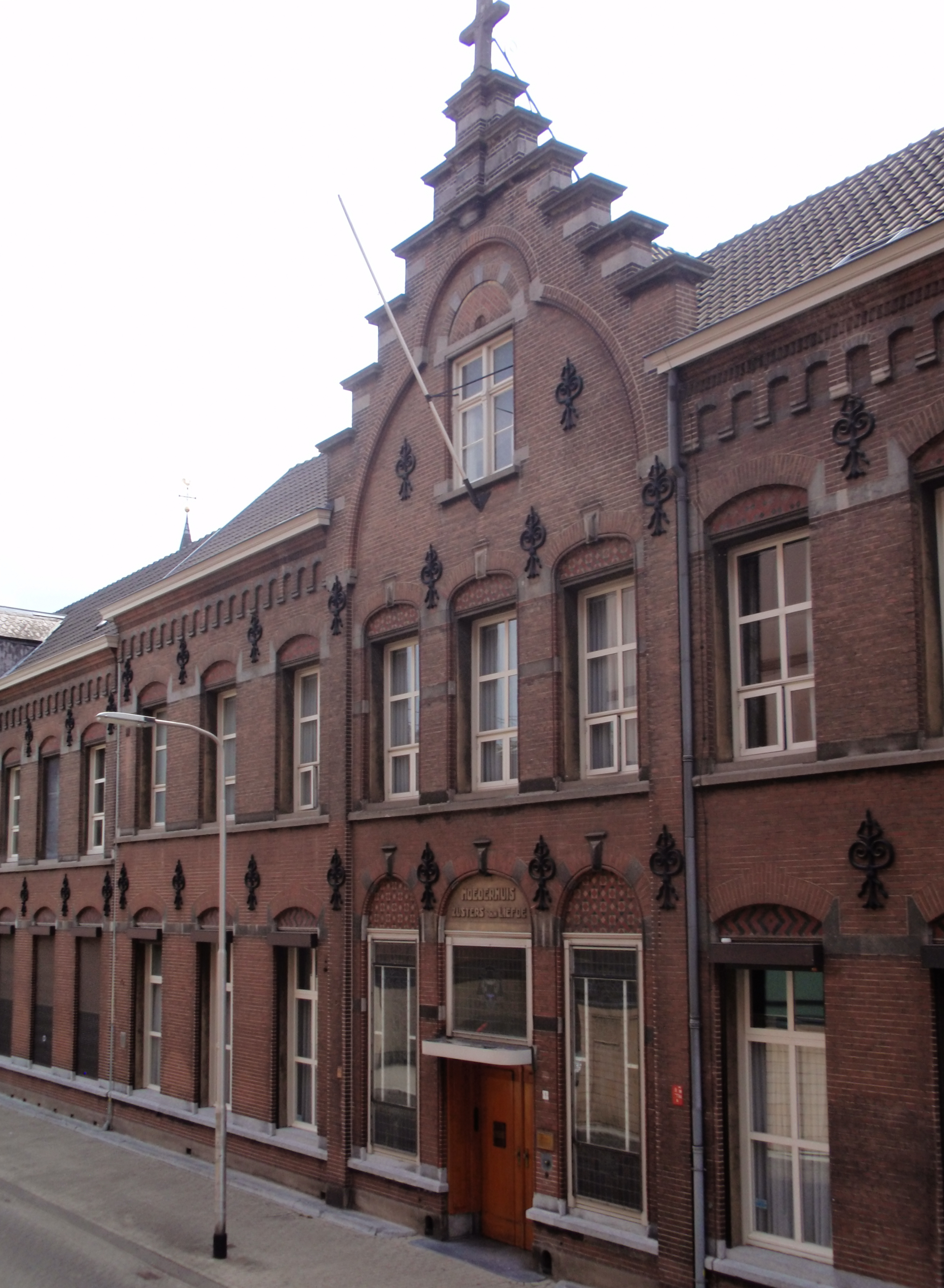

The Sisters of Charity of Our Lady Mother of Mercy (SCMM) are a Catholic religious congregation founded in the Netherlands in 1832 by Fr Johannes Zwijsen, aided by Mary M. Leijsen, for the instruction of children and the betterment of people deprived of spiritual aid. The motherhouse is in Tilburg.

== History ==
Because the founding of religious convents was not legal at that time, Zwijsen set up the firm of Verbunt & Co. as a front for the property and the work being carried out from there. In 1837 there was a request from the Jesuits at Delft for sisters to be sent to assist in their ministry. The firm of Verbunt & Co. was disbanded in 1848 when a change in the constitution rendered it unnecessary. That same year, the congregation received approval from Rome.

The See of Utrecht had been vacant for about three hundred years when, on the reestablishment of the Catholic hierarchy in the Netherlands in 1853, Bishop Johannes Zwijsen, of Gerra, was appointed archbishop of the reestablished Roman Catholic Archdiocese of Utrecht and Primate of the Netherlands. He found no Catholic institutions for the education of girls in this vast diocese, neither were there any teaching religious institutes, with the exception of his humble congregation.

Zwijsen's accession to the see gave fresh impetus to his cherished work, and from that time the congregation spread rapidly throughout the Netherlands and Belgium. Among these institutions were homes for the aged and infirm, the blind, the mute and also hospitals.

About the middle of the nineteenth century, when cholera was raging in the Netherlands, the heroic charity of the sisters even won the recognition of the fiercely anti-catholic King William III who conferred decorations of honour on the congregation.

In 1894 six sisters were dispatched to Surinam to care for lepers.

At its height, around 1940, there were approximately 4,300 sisters. The congregation operated training colleges for teachers in a number of locations.

== Present day ==
The motherhouse of the congregation is in Tilburg.

The first school run by the Sisters of Charity was founded in the village of Pantasaph (North Wales). The former St Clare's Convent included a boarding school, a hospital and an orphanage. It was built by a priest named Seraphin of Bruges, who brought the first group of sisters to it in 1861. It closed in 1977, having at its peak housed some 500 orphans. The site lay derelict for a number of years and was damaged by fire in 1985, but has since been partly demolished and the remainder restored as luxury accommodation. It is now a designated conservation area. As of 2019 the congregation has two houses in the UK and one in Ireland.

In 1874, a group of sisters arrived in Baltic, Connecticut and established the Academy and Boarding School of the Holy Family. Their ministry also included tending the sick in hospitals. A second school was opened in Willimantic, Connecticut. The members of the international community are based in East Haven, Connecticut.

In December 2005, this congregation had 889 members and 115 houses.

== Sisters of Charity of Our Lady, Mother of the Church (SCMC) ==
In 1970, Marie Alma, Provincial Superior of the Immaculate Heart of Mary Province of the Sisters of Charity in America, was given permission by Pope Paul VI to begin a new Congregation of diocesan right under the title Sisters of Charity of Our Lady, Mother of the Church (SCMC) in Baltic, CT. The Congregation flourished as a Congregation of diocesan right in the Norwich Diocese for twenty-three years. And on All Saints Day in 1993, John Paul II granted them their own Congregation under pontifical right. Their mission is "to live a life rooted in the Gospel, in imitation of Mary and expressed by prayer, charity, self sacrifice and loving obedience." They devote themselves to "the works of charity, and as true daughters in the heart of the Church, we serve others through the apostolates of education, caring for the sick, the aging and the poor, wherever there is a need." The Sisters of Charity of Our Lady, Mother of the Church continue to operate a nursing home St. Elizabeth's in WI, and the Academy of the Holy Family, an all girls Catholic high school in Baltic, CT.

== See also ==
- Sisters of Charity of Our Lady of Mercy (South Carolina)
- Brothers of Our Lady Mother of Mercy
