= Petrus Matthias Snickers =

Dutch Catholic bishop (1816–1895)

His Excellency Petrus Matthias Snickers
- Archbishop of Utrecht
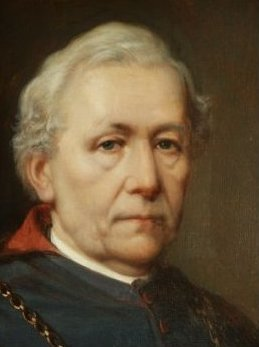
- Church: Roman Catholic
- Archdiocese: Utrecht
- See: Saint Catherine's Cathedral
- Appointed: 3 April 1883
- Term ended: 4 July 1895
- Predecessor: Andreas Ignatius Schaepman
- Successor: Henricus van de Wetering

Orders
- Consecration: 2 September 1877 by Andreas Ignatius Schaepman

Personal details
- Born: 11 April 1816 Rotterdam, Netherlands
- Died: 2 April 1895 (aged 78) Utrecht, Kingdom of the Netherlands
- Coat of arms

Petrus Matthias Snickers (11 April 1816 in Rotterdam – 2 April 1895 in Utrecht) was a Dutch Catholic bishop.

Petrus Matthias Snickers was born on 11 April 1816 in Rotterdam. He appointed Bishop of Haarlem on 31 July 1877 and consecrated on 2 September 1877 at Haarlem Cathedral, by Andreas Ignatius Schaepman, Primate of Netherlands. He was appointed Archbishop of Utrecht in 1883 and lead the archdiocese until his death on 2 April 1895.

Catholic Church titles
Preceded by Andreas Ignatius Schaepman	Archbishop of Utrecht; 1883–1895	Succeeded by Henricus van de Wetering
