= Schaepman =

Schaepman is a surname. Notable people with the surname include:

- Andreas Ignatius Schaepman (1815–1882), Dutch archbishop
- Herman Schaepman (1844–1903), Dutch priest, politician and poet
