= Johannes Zwijsen =

Archbishop of Utrecht (1794–1877)

His Excellency Johannes Zwijsen
- Archbishop of Utrecht
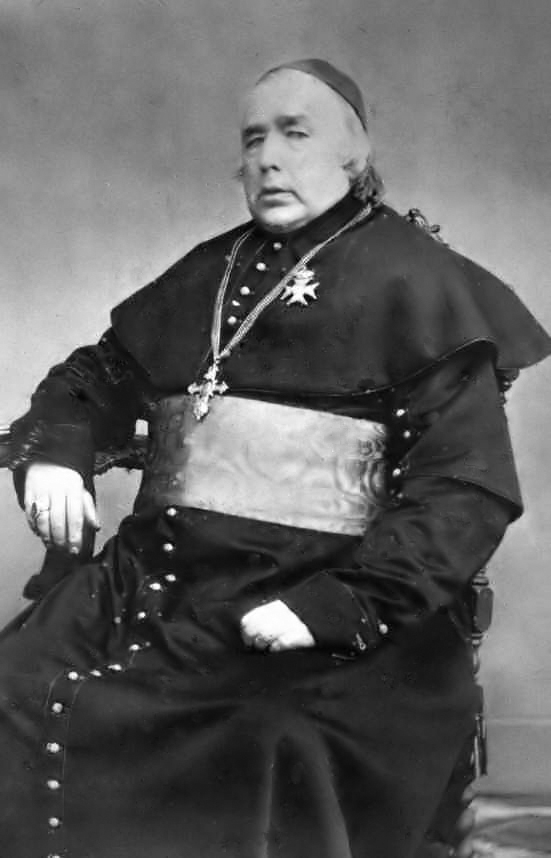
- Church: Roman Catholic
- Archdiocese: Utrecht
- See: Saint Catherine's Cathedral
- Appointed: 4 March 1853
- Term ended: 4 February 1868
- Predecessor: Episcopacy restored
- Successor: Andreas Ignatius Schaepman

Orders
- Ordination: 20 December 1817 by François Antoine Marie Constantin de Méan et de Beaurieux
- Consecration: 17 April 1842 by Cornelius Ludovicus de Wijkerslooth

Personal details
- Born: 28 August 1794 Tilburg, Dutch Republic
- Died: 16 October 1877 (aged 83) 's-Hertogenbosch

Johannes Zwijsen (Zwysen) (28 August 1794 – 16 October 1877) was a Dutch Catholic prelate who served as the first Archbishop of Utrecht after the reestablishment of the episcopal hierarchy in the Netherlands in 1853.

== Early life and priesthood ==
Johannes Zwijsen was born on 28 August 1794 in Tilburg. Zwijsen was ordained a deacon on 19 January 1817, and priest on 20 December 1817. He would first serve as a chaplain in Schijndel, after which he would become a pastor in Tilburg. During his time in Tilburg, he met the then heir apparent William II of the Netherlands. A strong friendship formed between the two, so strong even that some contemporaries implied a homosexual relationship. However, this seems to be founded merely in rumors. This unique bond that he shared with the king reached a culmination when he attended him at his deathbed in 1849. During this friendship with William II, Zwijsen became acquainted with the Dutch government, with people as Johan Rudolph Thorbecke in particular.

== Titular bishop and apostolic vicar ==
On 17 April 1842, he was consecrated Titular bishop of Geras and Coadjutor of the Apostolic vicar of s-Hertogenbosch, at Church of Saint Denis in Tilburg, by baron Cornelius Ludovicus van Wijkerslooth, ordaining bishop for the Netherlands. Zwijsen took as his episcopal motto: Mansuete et fortiter, mild and strong. He would live up to this motto by keeping his head down whenever he got into conflict with the protestant population, even once telling Pope Pius IX that the best way to achieve anything in his country was to do it silently.

This did not mean he sat on his hands. He founded the Sisters of Charity of Our Lady Mother of Mercy as a teaching order, and the Brothers of Our Lady Mother of Mercy to carry out works of charity and works of mercy. In 1847 he was appointed Apostolic vicar of the Dutch Mission (Hollandse Zending), until 1848.

== First Archbishop of Utrecht ==
When Pope Pius IX, with the apostolic letter "Ex qua die", reorganized the Catholic Church of the Netherlands, Utrecht was raised once more to an archbishopric, and Zwijsen was named the first archbishop; as administrator he also ruled the diocese of 's-Hertogenbosch. His connection to the Dutch government, one he had obtained through his friendship with William II, was most probably a factor in this appointment. He took up with great energy and caution the organization of the restored archdiocese, even though he had preferred it to be based in s-Hertogenbosch. By numerous excellent decrees he provided for the improvement of discipline, the encouragement of orders and of church associations and for the establishment of Catholic schools. In 1857 opened the diocesan seminary for the training of a competent clergy. In 1858 the cathedral chapters of the archdiocese were organized and in 1864 the first provincial synod was held.

== Resignation and death ==
Zwijsen resigned as archbishop of Utrecht on 4 February 1868, retaining only the direction of the diocese of 's-Hertogenbosch. Here he remained bishop until his death on 16 October 1877.

Catholic Church titles
Vacant see	Archbishop of Utrecht; 1853–1868	Succeeded by Andreas Ignatius Schaepman
