= Johannes Antonius de Kok =

Dutch Roman Catholic auxiliary bishop (born 1930)

The Most Reverend Johannes Antonius de Kok O.F.M.
- Titular Bishop of Trevico, Auxiliary Bishop Emeritus of Utrecht
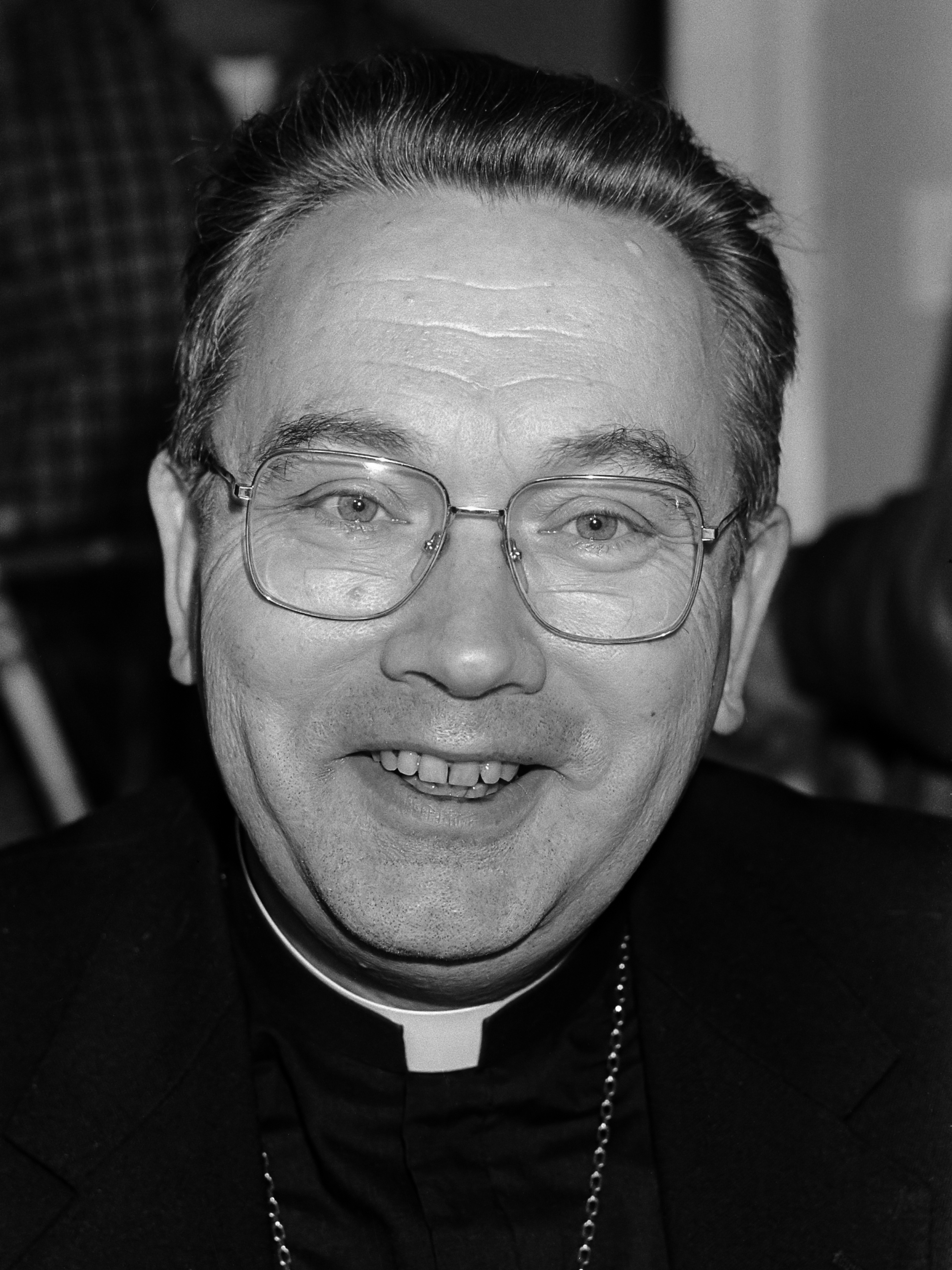
- Church: Catholic Church
- Archdiocese: Roman Catholic Archdiocese of Utrecht
- See: Utrecht
- Appointed: 15 January 1982
- Term ended: 27 August 2005

Orders
- Ordination: 11 March 1956
- Consecration: 6 March 1982 by Johannes Cardinal Willebrands

Personal details
- Born: 28 August 1930 (age 96) The Hague, Netherlands
- Denomination: Roman Catholic
- Education: Nijmegen Catholic University
- Motto: Communicantes in fidelitate

Johannes Antonius de Kok, O.F.M. (born 28 August 1930) is a Dutch Roman Catholic prelate, who served as Auxiliary Bishop of the Roman Catholic Archdiocese of Utrecht from 1982 until his retirement in 2005. A member of the Order of Friars Minor (Franciscans), he combined pastoral ministry with service in diocesan governance for more than two decades.

== Early life and religious formation ==
De Kok was born on 28 August 1930 in The Hague, Netherlands. He entered the Order of Friars Minor at a young age and received his formation within the Franciscan tradition, which emphasizes community life, pastoral care, and simplicity. He was ordained a priest on 11 March 1956. Graduated in history at the Nijmegen Catholic University.

In the years following his ordination, he exercised pastoral ministry within the Franciscan province in the Netherlands and became involved in diocesan work.

== Episcopal ministry ==
On 15 January 1982, de Kok was appointed Auxiliary Bishop of Utrecht and Titular Bishop of Trevico by Pope John Paul II. He received episcopal consecration on 6 March 1982 from Johannes Cardinal Willebrands, then Archbishop of Utrecht.

As auxiliary bishop, de Kok assisted the archbishop in pastoral oversight of parishes, clergy support, confirmations, and diocesan administration. His episcopal motto, Communicantes in fidelitate ("Sharing in fidelity"), reflected both his Franciscan spirituality and his emphasis on communion within the Church.

During his more than twenty years in office, he contributed to the pastoral life of the archdiocese during a period of significant social and ecclesial change in the Netherlands. He worked closely with clergy, religious communities, and lay faithful throughout the region.

== Retirement ==
Upon reaching the canonical retirement age, de Kok submitted his resignation, which was accepted on 27 August 2005. He thereafter held the title of Auxiliary Bishop Emeritus of Utrecht.

In 2022, the 40th anniversary of his episcopal ordination was marked within the Dutch Franciscan community.
