= Johannes Henricus Gerardus Jansen =

Dutch Catholic archbishop (1868–1936)

His Excellency Johannes Henricus Gerardus Jansen
- Archbishop of Utrecht; Primate of the Netherlands
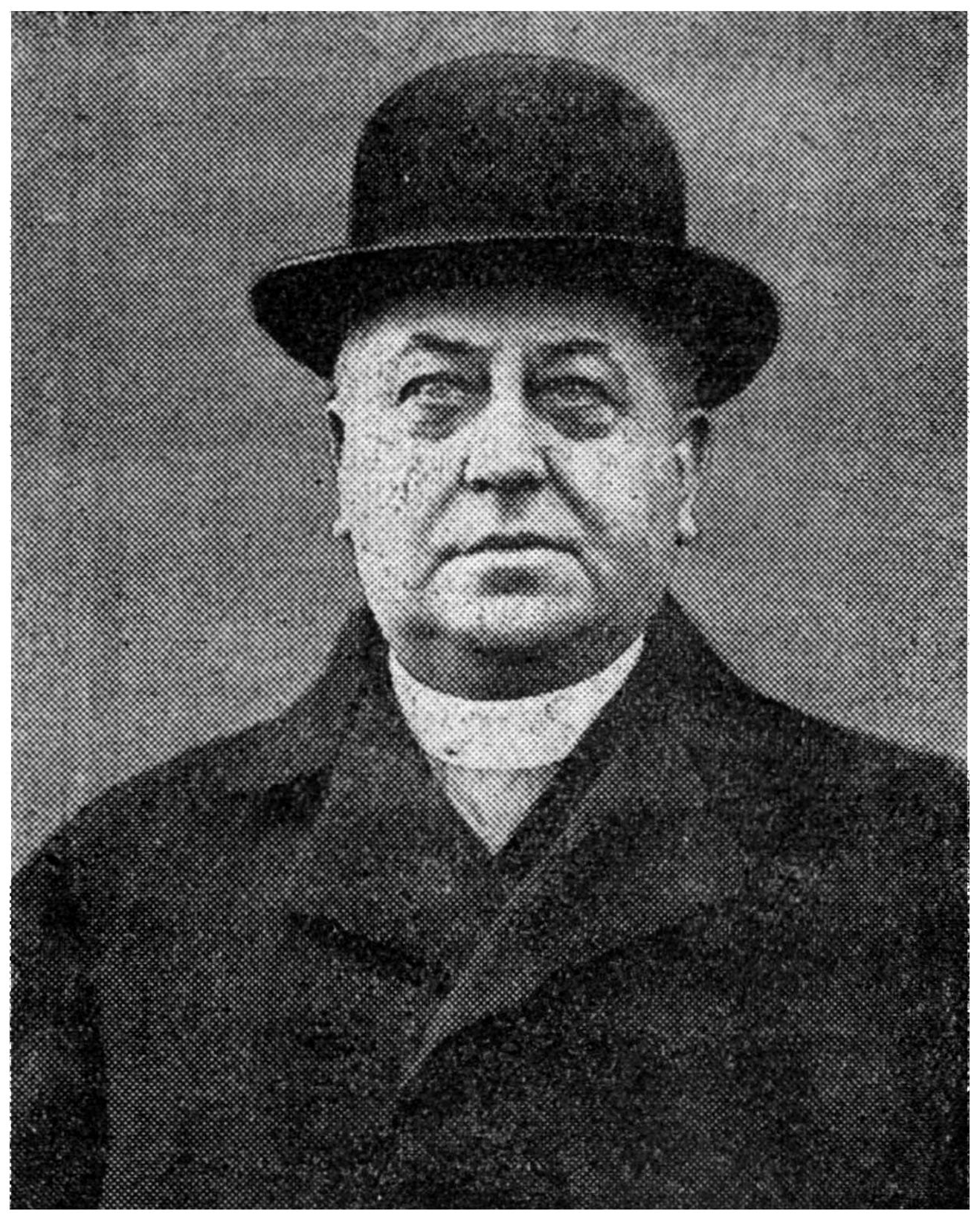
- J. H. G. Jansen before his appointment to Archbishop, 1930
- Church: Roman Catholic
- Archdiocese: Utrecht
- Appointed: 11 April 1930
- In office: 1930–1936
- Predecessor: Henricus van de Wetering
- Successor: Johannes de Jong
- Other post: Titular Archbishop of Selymbria

Orders
- Ordination: 15 August 1893
- Consecration: 5 June 1930 by Lorenzo Schioppa
- Rank: Metropolitan Archbishop

Personal details
- Born: May 9, 1868 Leeuwarden, Netherlands
- Died: May 17, 1936 (aged 68) Utrecht, Netherlands
- Buried: St Catherine's Cathedral, Utrecht

Johannes Henricus Gerardus Jansen (9 May 1868 – 6 February 1936) was a former Archbishop of Utrecht and Roman Catholic Primate of the Netherlands. He was born in Leeuwarden, in the Dutch province of Friesland.

On 11 April 1930 he was named Archbishop of Utrecht and then consecrated by Lorenzo Schioppa, the Apostolic Internuncio to Netherlands, at the time. On 6 February 1936 he died in Utrecht and was buried in the metropolitan cathedral.

Catholic Church titles
Preceded by Henricus van de Wetering	Archbishop of Utrecht; 1930–1936	Succeeded by Johannes de Jong
