= De Phenix, Nes =

Windmill in Nes, Netherlands

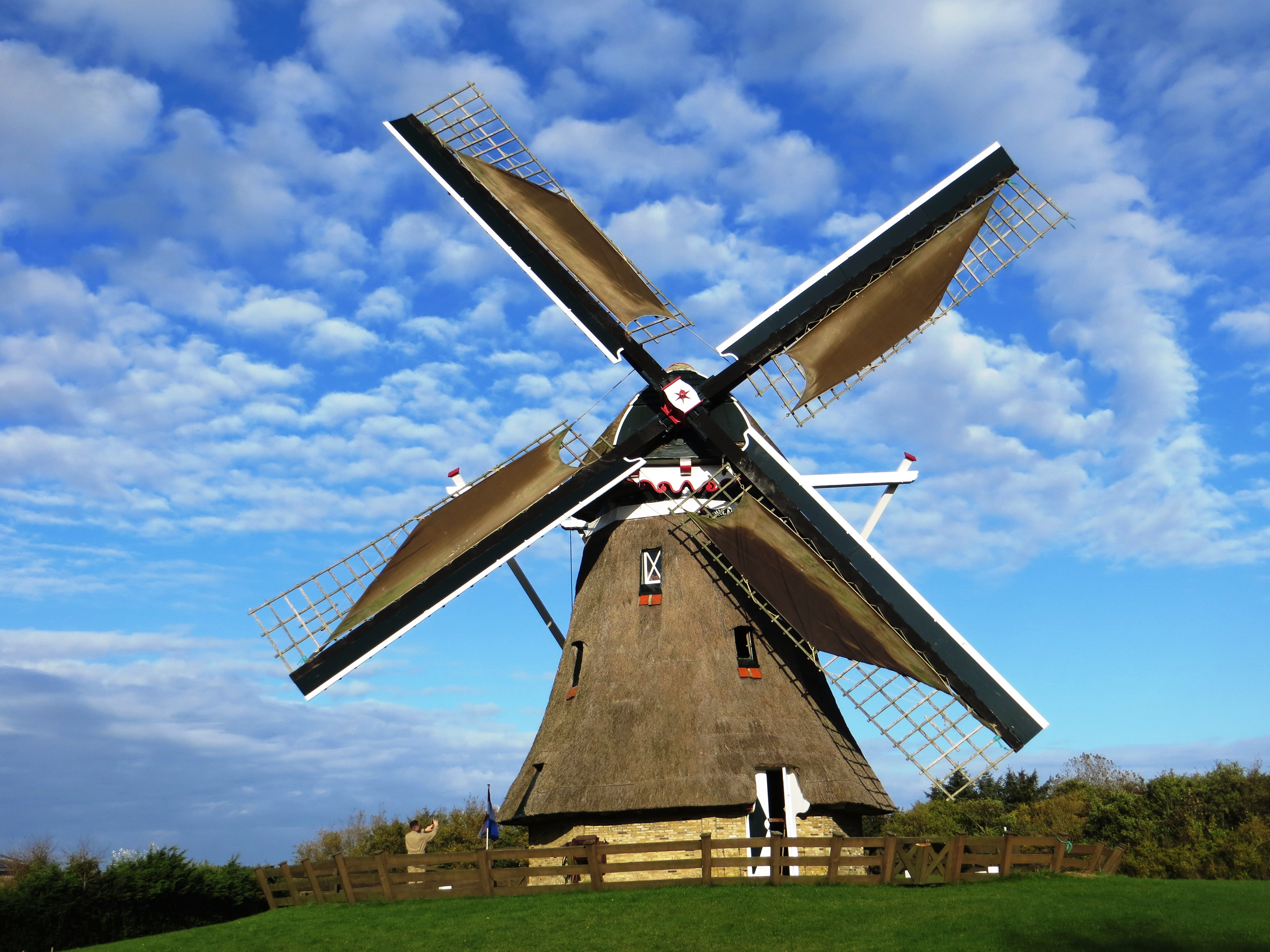
- De Phenix, October 2013
- Interactive map of De Phenix, Nes

Origin
- Mill name: De Phenix
- Mill location: Jan Jacobstraat 7, 9163 HG Nes
- Coordinates: 53°26′50″N 5°46′27″E
- Operator: Gemeente Ameland
- Year built: 1880

Information
- Purpose: Corn mill
- Type: Smock mill
- Storeys: Three storey smock
- Base storeys: Low brick base
- Smock sides: Eight sides
- No. of sails: Four sails
- Type of sails: Common sails
- Windshaft: Cast iron
- Winding: Tailpole and winch
- No. of pairs of millstones: One pair of millstones
- Size of millstones: 1.40 metres (4 ft 7 in) diameter,

De Phenix (English: The Phoenix) is a smock mill in Nes, Ameland, Friesland, Netherlands which was built in 1880 and is in working order. The mill is listed as a Rijksmonument.

== History ==
The first mill on the site was a post mill that was wrecked by a storm on 31 December 1833. It was replaced by a smock mill, De Hoop (English: The Hope) in 1834. On 20 June 1880, De Hoop was struck by lightning and destroyed by fire. De Phenix was built to replace it . It was erected in 1880 by the millwright Van der Meer of Harlingen. The mill was restored in 1952 and again in 1982 by millwright Westra of Franeker. It is the only Grondzeiler surviving in Friesland that is a corn mill. De Phenix is listed as a Rijksmonument, number 7611.

== Description ==
De Phenix is what the Dutch describe as a "Grondzeiler". There is no stage, the sails reaching almost to ground level. It is a smock mill on a low brick base. The smock and cap are thatched. The mill is winded by tailpole and winch. The sails are Common sails. They have a span of 17.90 metres (58 ft 9 in). The sails are carried on a cast-iron windshaft which was made by Penn & Bauduin in 1900. The windshaft also carries the brake wheel, which has 56 cogs. This drives the wallower (33 cogs) at the top of the upright shaft. At the bottom of the upright shaft, the great spur wheel, which has 63 cogs. The great spur wheel drives one pair of millstones via a lantern pinion stone nut which has 19 staves. The millstones are 1.40 metres (4 ft 7 in) diameter.

== Millers ==
- J P Boelens (1836- )

References for above:-
