= Museum Catharijneconvent =

St. Catherine's Convent Museum
- Museum Catharijneconvent
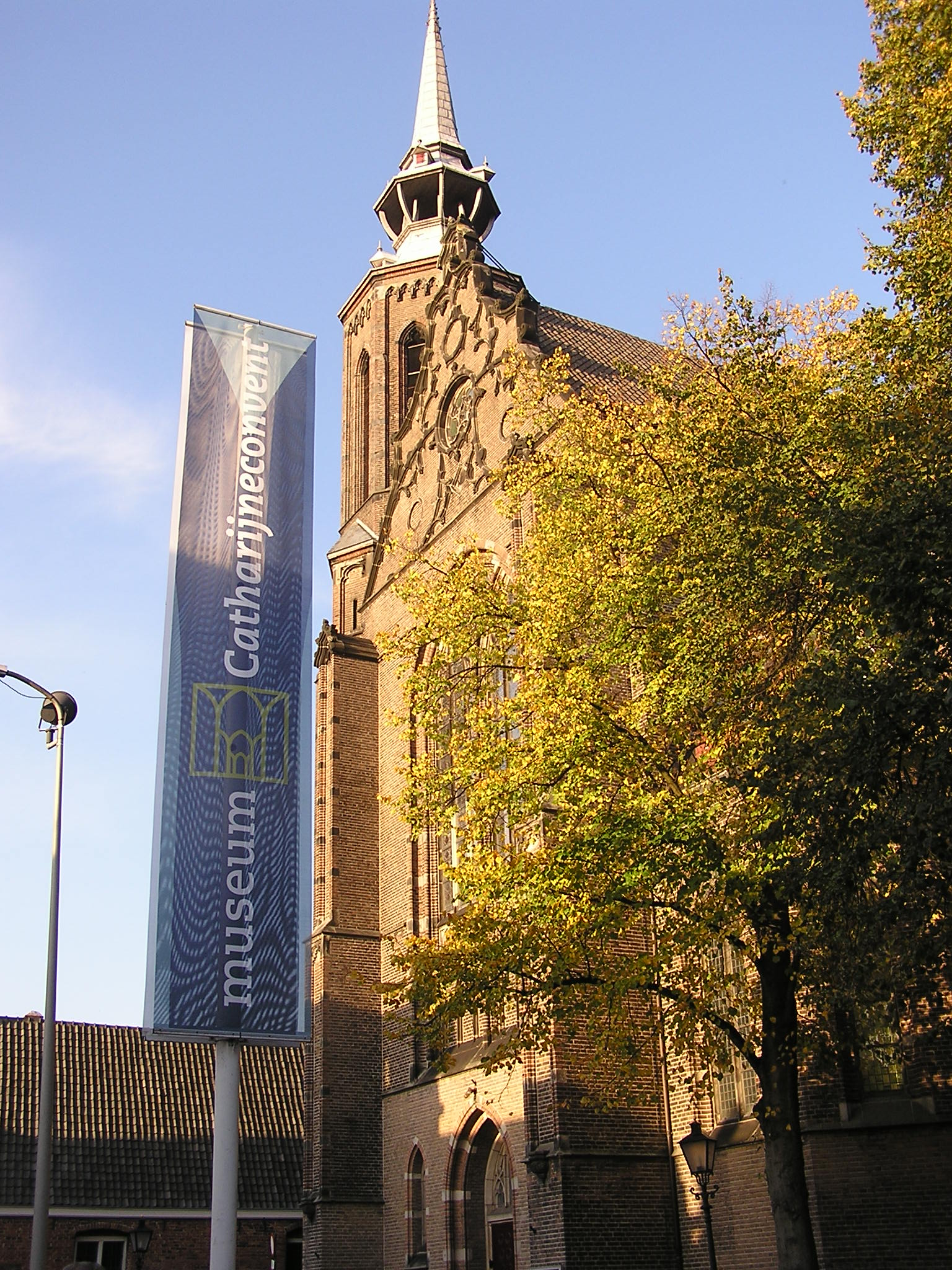
- Banner of the museum in 2006, with St. Catherine's Cathedral
- Established: 1979
- Location: Lange Nieuwstraat 38, Utrecht, Netherlands
- Coordinates: 52°5′14″N 5°7′27″E
- Type: Religious art museum
- Website: catharijneconvent.nl

The Museum Catharijneconvent (St. Catherine's Convent Museum) is a museum of religious art in Utrecht, Netherlands. It is located in the former St. Catharine convent, having been sited there since 1979. Its collections include many artifacts from the museum of religious art of the Catholic Archbishopric of Utrecht, located in the convent until 1979. In 2006 the convent closed for restoration. It is part of the Utrecht Museum Night. The church of the former convent is the current Roman Catholic Cathedral of Utrecht

== Collection ==
The museum has an extensive collection of historical and art-historical objects from the early Middle Ages to the present. The vast collection presents a picture of Protestant and Catholic art and cultural history of the Netherlands, and its impact on Dutch society. The collection includes richly illustrated manuscripts, book-bindings decorated with precious stones, richly-worked images, paintings, altarpieces, pieces of clothing and ecclesiastical objects in gold and silver. Among the highlights in the collection are the 9th-century chalice of Saint Lebuinus and carved ivories from the Lebuïnuskerk in Deventer.

Dutch painting of the 16th and 17th centuries is represented by a selection of works by Jan van Scorel and Pieter Saenredam, and more recent Dutch artworks by Jan Toorop, Shinkichi Tajiri, Frans Franciscus, Guido van der Werve and Marc Mulders.
