= Henricus Loos =

Archbishop of Utrecht (1858-1873)

- Old Catholic Archbishop of Utrecht
- Church: Old Catholic Church
- Archdiocese: Utrecht
- In office: 1858-1873
- Predecessor: Johannes van Santen
- Successor: Johannes Heykamp

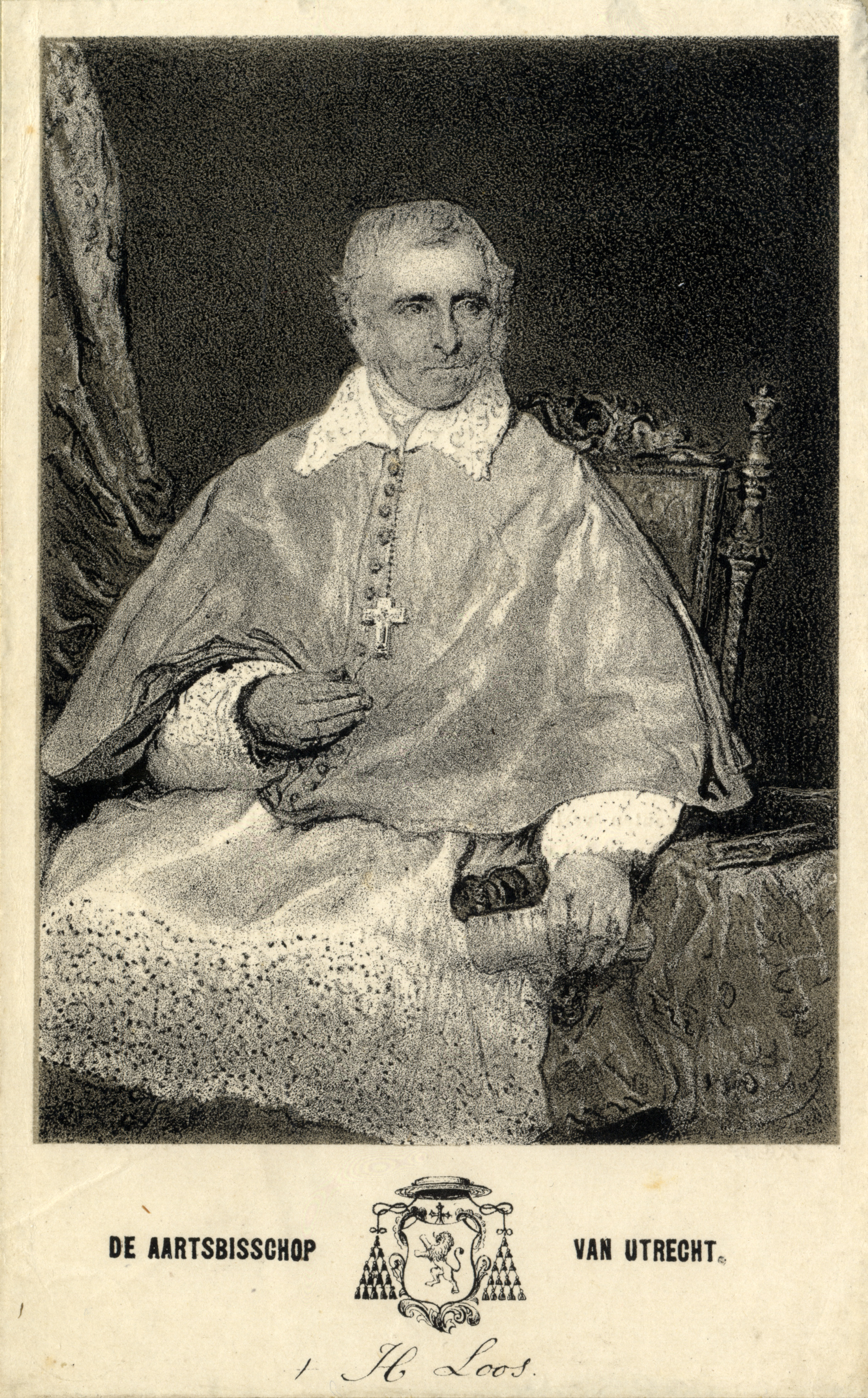
Portret van Henricus Loos, vijftiende aartsbisschop van Utrecht van 1858 tot 1873

Henricus Loos served as the fifteenth Archbishop of Utrecht from 1858 to 1873. Together with Bishop Hermann Heykamp of Deventer, Loos is known as one of the bishops whose orders were recognized by the Roman Catholic Church, but who were not invited to the First Vatican Council because they were considered schismatic. Loos served as Archbishop of Utrecht during the first two Old Catholic Congresses in Munich in 1871 and in Cologne in 1872.

== Death ==
[1]

Catholic Church titles
Preceded by Johannes van Santen; 1825-1858	Old Catholic Archbishop of Utrecht; 1858-1873	Succeeded by Johannes Heykamp; 1875-1892
