= Johannes Heykamp =

Archbishop of Utrecht from 1875 to 1882

- Old Catholic Archbishop of Utrecht
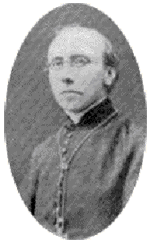
- Johannes Heycamp
- Church: Old Catholic Church
- Archdiocese: Utrecht
- In office: 1875-1892
- Predecessor: Henricus Loos
- Successor: Gerardus Gul

Orders
- Consecration: 8 April 1875 by Gaspardus Johannes Rinkel & Josef Hubert Reinkens

Personal details
- Died: 8 January 1892

Johannes Heykamp (Johannes Heijkamp) served as the sixteenth Archbishop of Utrecht from 1875 to 1892. A learned theologian, Heykamp is most remembered for summoning the conference that led to the Declaration of Utrecht.

== Early Ministry ==
Before serving as Archbishop of Utrecht, Heykamp served as a parish priest in Schiedam.

== Archbishop of Utrecht ==
Following the death of Henricus Loos, Archbishop of Utrecht, on 4 June 1873, Heykamp was consecrated Archbishop of Utrecht by Bishop Gaspardus Johannes Rinkel of Haarlem and Josef Hubert Reinkens of Bonn.

Heykamp immediately nominated and consecrated Cornelius Diependaal as Old Catholic bishop of Deventer, so that the three Old Catholic sees of Utrecht, Haarlem and Deventer were all filled for the first time since Bishop Lambertus de Jong’s death in 1867.

C.B. Moss described Heykamp as “a learned and saintly divine of the old school, still living in thought within the Roman Catholic world, the gates of which had been closed upon him.”

== Theology ==
Among Old Catholic bishops, Heykamp was notable for his theological works. In 1870, he wrote an attack on papal infallibility, under the pseudonym of Adulfus. He also penned a protest against a petition by Roman Catholic bishops in the Netherlands to King William III, for the restoration of temporal power to the pope. In 1880, he replied to an encyclical by Leo XIII that suggested that the civil marriage of Roman Catholics was not valid. Drawing from scripture, the decrees of ecumenical councils, and the work of the great canonist-pope Benedict XIV, he argued that marriage is of natural right and can exist for Catholics outside the blessing of the sacrament of marriage.

== The Declaration of Utrecht ==
C.B. Moss writes that “Archbishop Heykamp performed his greatest service to the Old Catholic cause by summoning the conference which led to the Declaration of Utrecht.” The conference convened on 24 September 1889 and consisted of five Old Catholic bishops, as well as theologians from the Dutch, German and Swiss Old Catholic churches. Heykamp chaired this conference, which took steps to unite the various Old Catholic churches. Most notably, the Declaration of Utrecht asserted that the Council of Trent had no infallible authority, except insofar as its teachings represented the Primitive Church, thus clearing a path to union for the Old Catholic churches with the Eastern Orthodox Church and the Anglican Communion.

== Death ==
Heykamp died on 8 January 1892, after a brief illness.

Catholic Church titles
Preceded by Henricus Loos; 1858-1873	Old Catholic Archbishop of Utrecht; 1875-1892	Succeeded by Gerardus Gul; 1892-1920
