= Bonaventura Engelbertz van Oldenzeel =

Roman Catholic prelate

Most Reverend Bonaventura Engelbertz van Oldenzeel
- Auxiliary Bishop of Utrecht
- Church: Catholic Church
- Diocese: Diocese of Utrecht
- In office: 1538–1539

Orders
- Consecration: Nov 1538 by George van Egmond

Personal details
- Died: 1539 Utrecht, Netherlands

Bonaventura Engelbertz van Oldenzeel (died 1539) was a Roman Catholic prelate who served as Auxiliary Bishop of Utrecht (1538–1539).

== Biography ==
Bonaventura Engelbertz van Oldenzeel was ordained a priest in the Order of Friars Minor. On 30 Oct 1538, he was appointed during the papacy of Pope Paul III as Auxiliary Bishop of Utrecht and Titular Bishop of Hebron. in Nov 1538, he was consecrated bishop by George van Egmond, Bishop of Utrecht. He served as Auxiliary Bishop of Utrecht until his death in 1539.
