= Brothers of Our Lady Mother of Mercy =

Brothers of Our Lady, Mother of Mercy
- Congregatio Fratrum B. Mariæ V., Matris Misericordiae (Latin)
- Coat of arms of the congregation
- Abbreviation: C.M.M. (post-nominal letters)
- Formation: 25 August 1844; 182 years ago
- Founder: Johannes Zwijsen
- Founded at: Tilburg, the Netherlands
- Type: Lay Religious Congregation of Pontifical Right (for Men)
- Headquarters: Generalate; Via Bogliasco, 34, 00165 Rome, Italy
- Coordinates: 41°54′4.9″N 12°27′38.2″E
- Members: 300
- Motto: Latin: Mansuete et Fottiter; English: With meekness and strength
- Superior General: Br. Lawrence Obiko, CMM
- Ministry: Works of charity and works of mercy
- Website: www.cmmbrothers.org/en

The Brothers of Our Lady Mother of Mercy (Latin: Congregatio Fratrum B. Mariæ V., Matris Misericordiæ), sometimes called the Brothers CMM or Brothers of Tilburg, is a Catholic lay religious congregation of pontifical right for men founded in Tilburg, the Netherlands, in 1844 by Johannes Zwijsen, and initially placed under the leadership of Franciscus Salesius de Beer (1821–1901). The purpose of the congregation was to carry out works of charity and works of mercy. The congregation currently has about 300 members working in 10 countries. In June 2014, Brother Lawrence Obiko was elected as superior general of the congregation. Its members add the nominal letters C.M.M. after their names to indicate membership in the congregation.

== Reading ==
- Charles van Leeuwen, Bishop Zwijsen and his First Brothers. The Founder, the Founding Generation and the Foundation History (Valkhof Pers, Nijmegen, 2014). History of the Brothers of Our Lady Mother of Mercy, volume 1.
- Charles van Leeuwen, Conscientious and Caring. Portrait of Father Superior De Beer, 1821-1901 (Valkhof Pers, Nijmegen, 2014). History of the Brothers of Our Lady Mother of Mercy, volume 2
