= Nes, Ameland =

Nes
- Village
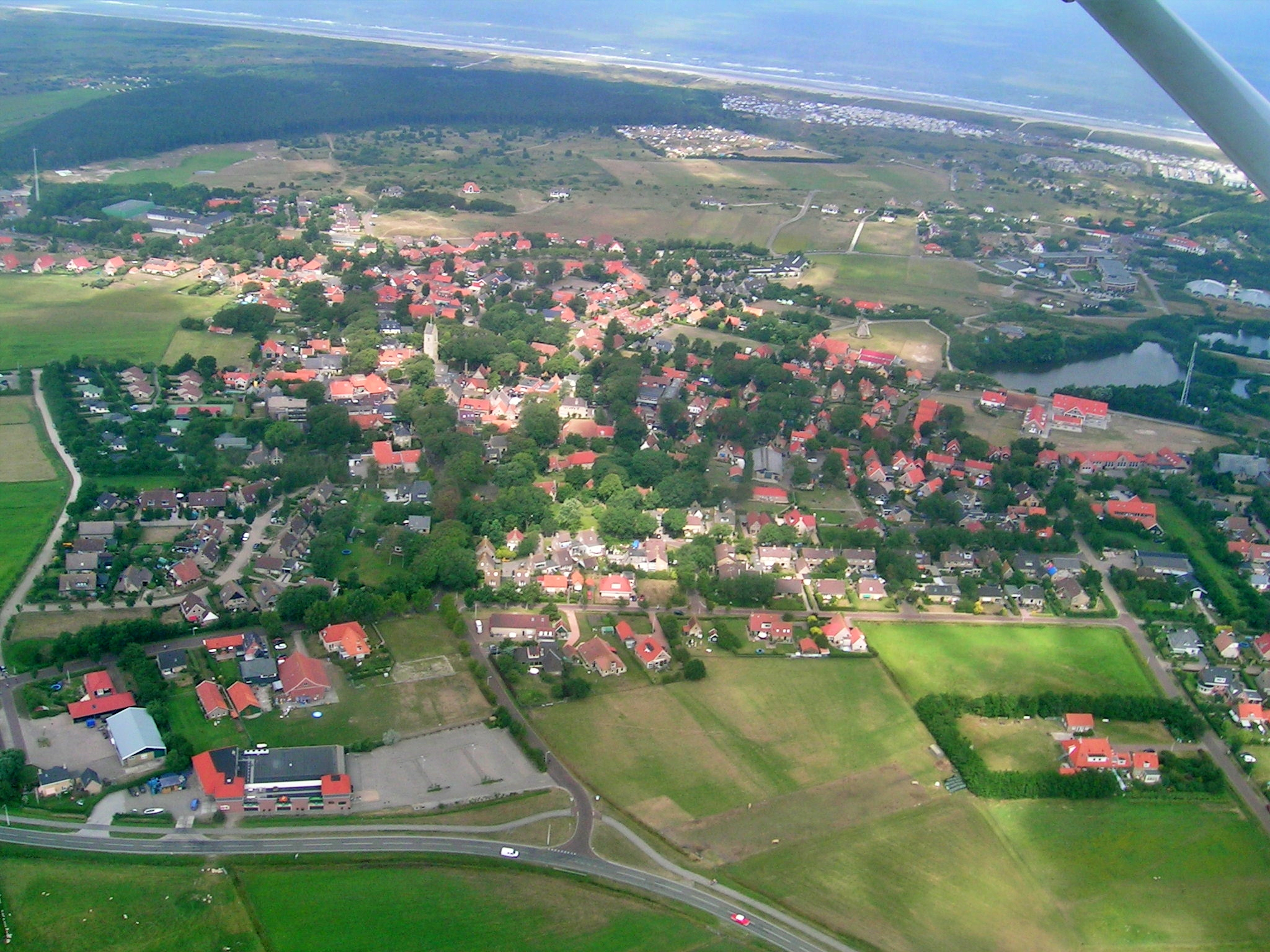
- Nes

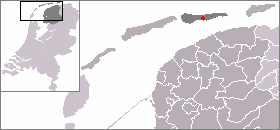
- Location in Ameland municipality

- Location in the province of Friesland Nes (Netherlands)
- Coordinates: 53°26′42″N 5°46′23″E
- Country: Netherlands
- Province: Friesland
- Municipality: Ameland

Area
  - Total: 12.66 km^{2} (4.89 sq mi)
- Elevation: 1.7 m (5.6 ft)

Population (2021)
  - Total: 1,235
  - Density: 97.55/km^{2} (252.7/sq mi)
- Time zone: UTC+1 (CET)
  - Summer (DST): UTC+2 (CEST)
- Postal code: 9163
- Dialing code: 0519

Nes (Dutch pronunciation: [nɛs]) is the second largest village on the island of Ameland, one of the West Frisian Islands in the northern Netherlands.

It constitutes the main village of the eastern, Roman Catholic part of Ameland and had a population of 1,155 as of January 2017. In the past, the Catholic Amelanders were involved in many conflicts with the western, Protestant Amelanders living in Hollum and Ballum. Nes has since become a popular tourist destination, as the place where the ferry from the mainland arrives. The village has many small shops and restaurants, a microdistillery, and a windmill, De Phenix.

== Harbour ==
At Nes, on the south side of Ameland, lie the spring dock and marina on the island, one of the 17 Wadden Sea ports. The rescue station KNRM has separate these facilities in the Ballumerbocht, about 4 km east of the causeway. The marina is managed by the Foundation Marina Leyegat and is open from April 1 until November 1. At low tide, the port only to sail on small boats because of the shallow depth of 0.60 to 0.80 m at the harbor entrance. Acceptances route through the Reegeul is straight and clearly marked out. The harbor entrance is on the east side of the ferry jetty, from the Reegeul should be considered separately and accepts ferries and excursion boats. Traps can dry in various places, such as the east of the marina. The port has floating docks with power, a port office with meteorological and tidal information and sanitation.

== Gallery ==
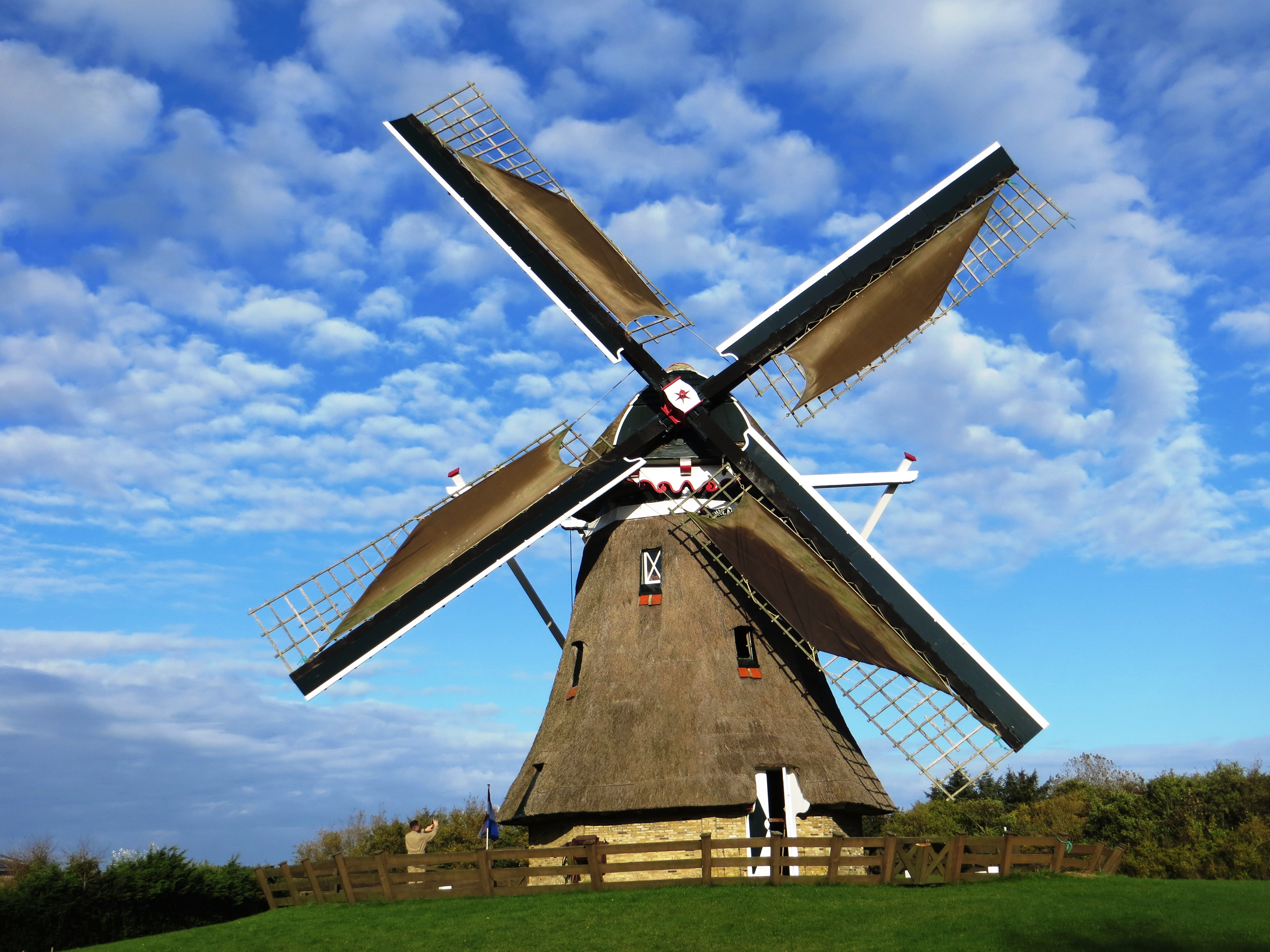
Windmill De Phenix

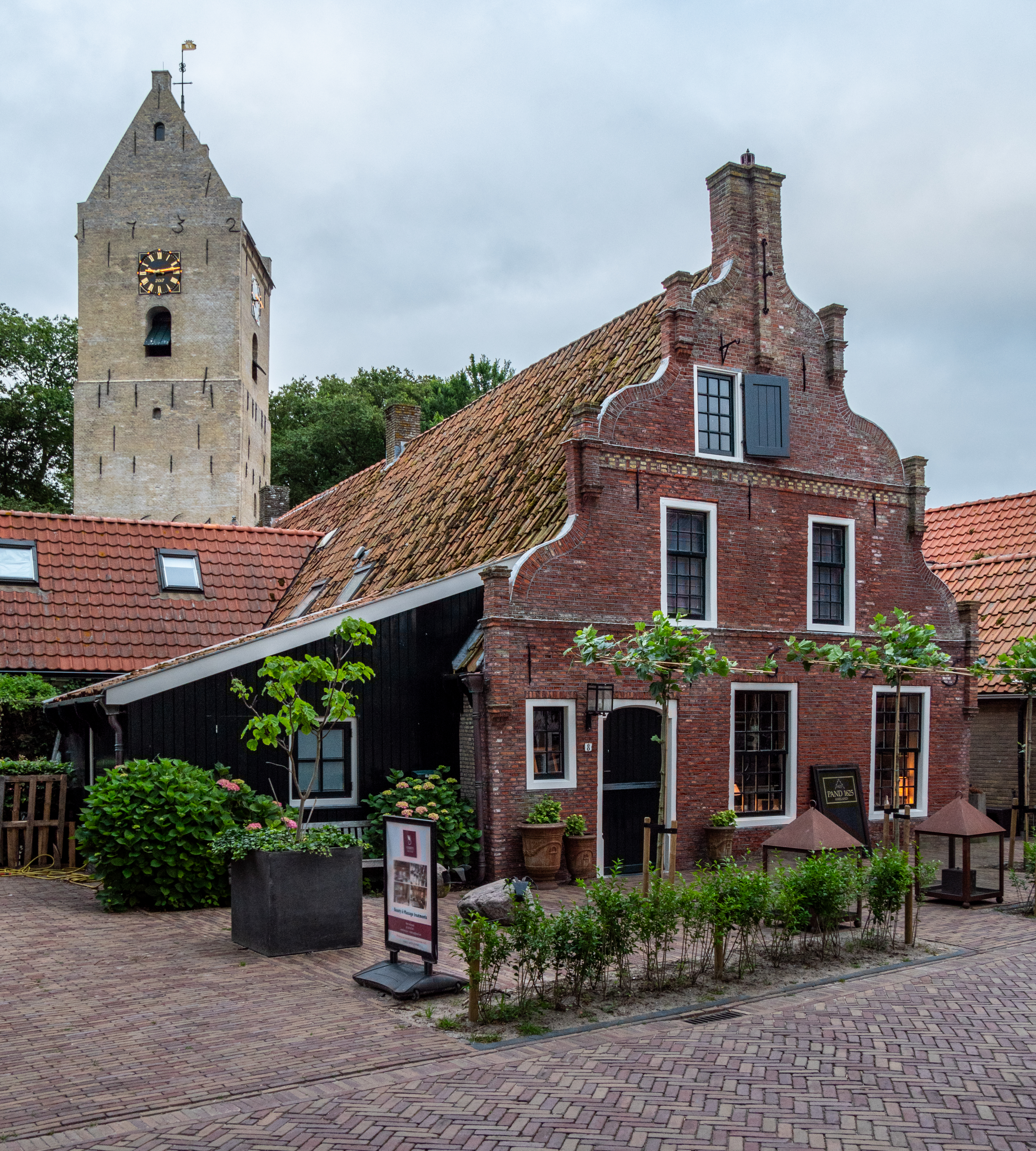
Rixt van Doniastraat 8

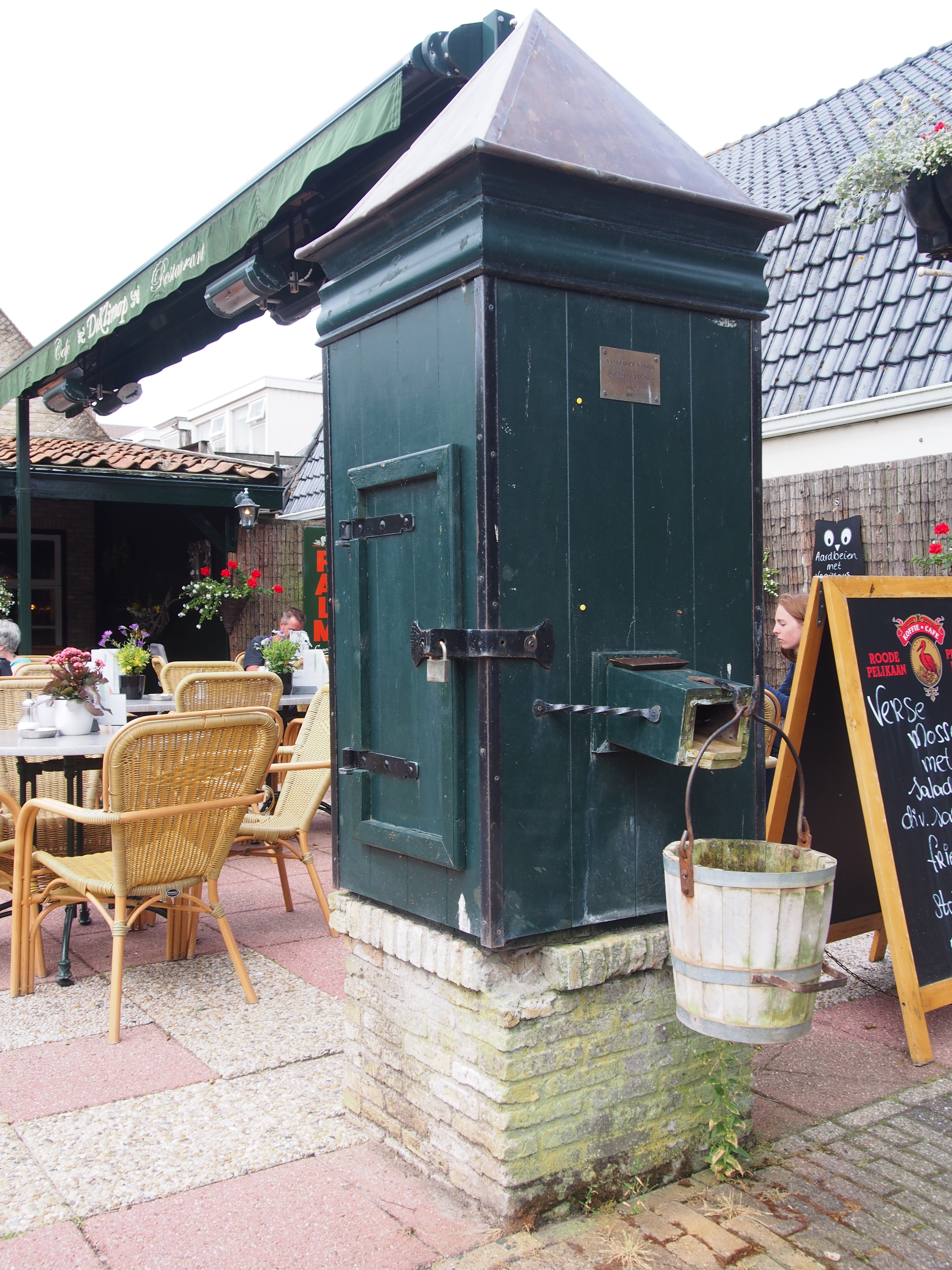
Village pump

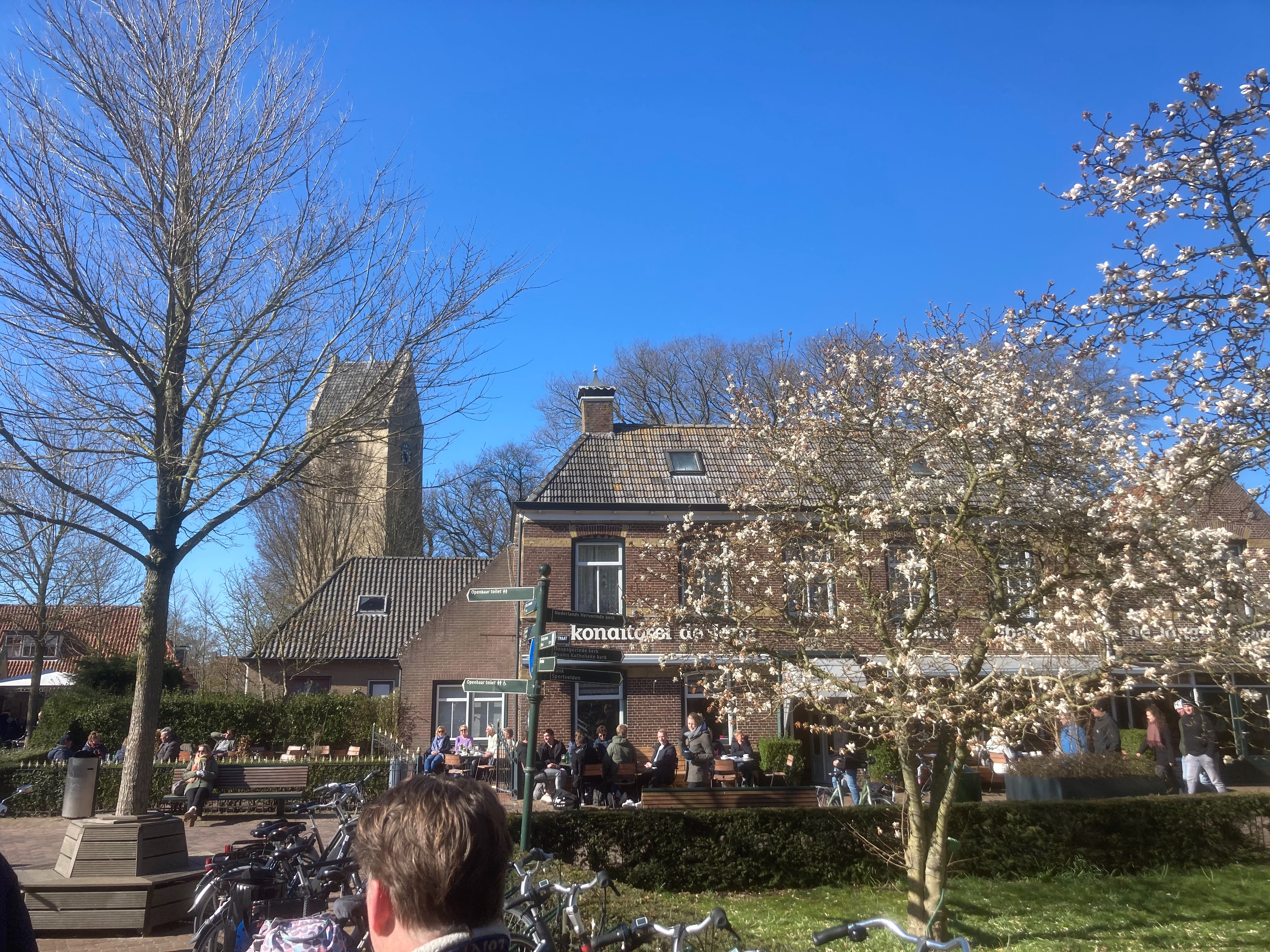
Centre of Nes

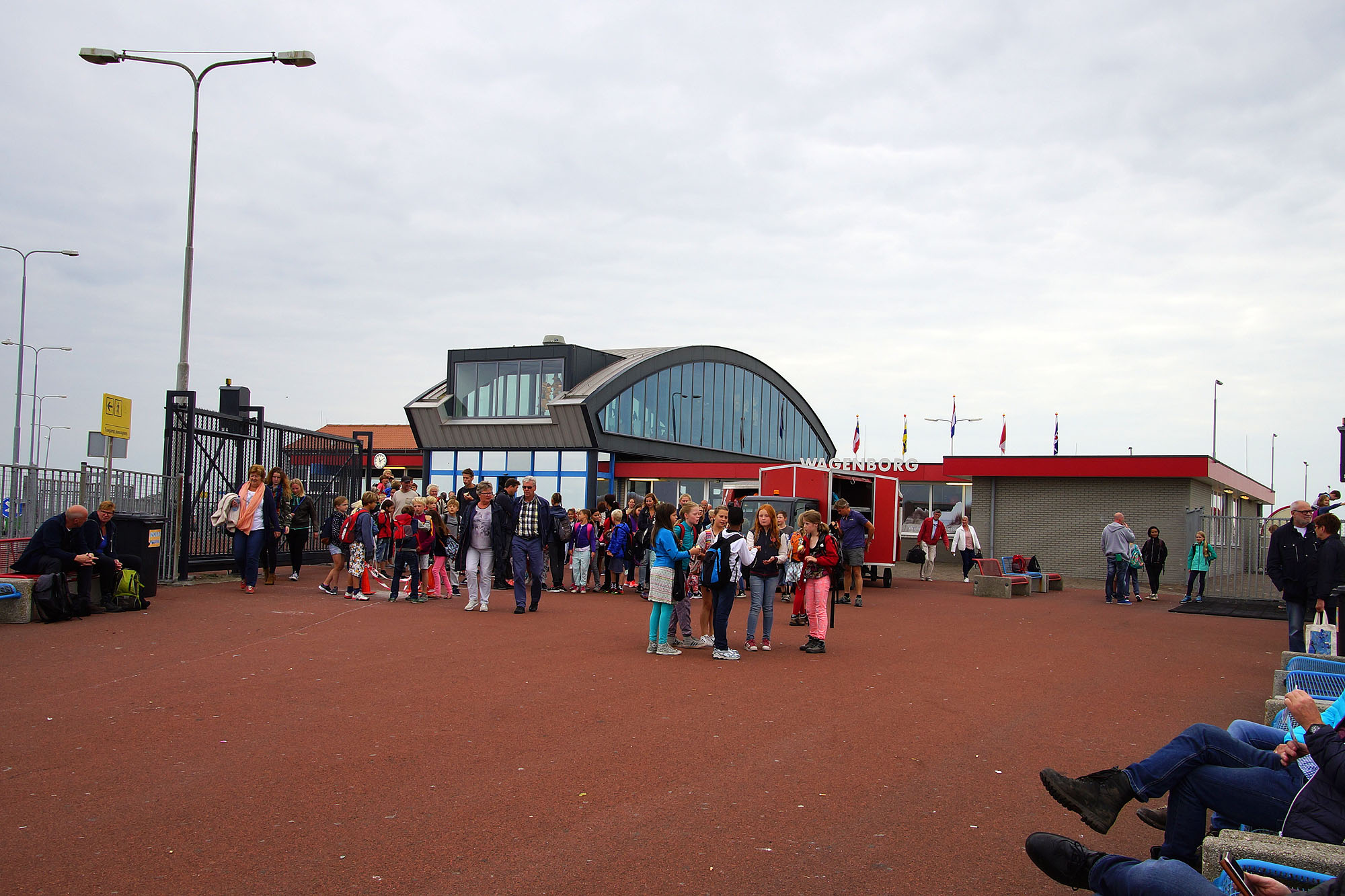
Tourists emerge from the ferry
