= Museum Night (Belgium and the Netherlands) =

Annual event in Belgium and the Netherlands

Museum Night (Dutch: Museumnacht; French: Nuit des musées) is an annual event in several cities in Belgium and the Netherlands. Museums collaborate and people are able to buy one ticket to access all the participating museums in a particular city.

One of the most popular events is Museum Night in Amsterdam, but other events are also held in cities, including:

- Almere
- Antwerp
- Breda
- Brussels
- The Hague
- Delft
- Ghent
- Leiden
- Maastricht
- Mons
- Ostend
- Roermond
- Rotterdam
- Utrecht

The participating Amsterdam museums are yearly opened on the first Saturday of November from 7 p.m. until 2 a.m. the next day. Besides the normal exhibitions in museums, activities are arranged, like artist performances and free guides. In some events, public transport can be freely used for people who bought a ticket.
