= Godefridus Yerwerd =

Most Reverend Godefridus Yerwerd
- Auxiliary Bishop of Utrecht
- Church: Catholic Church
- Diocese: Diocese of Utrecht
- In office: 1476–1483
- Previous post: Auxiliary Bishop of Osnabrück (1471–1476)

Personal details
- Died: Jan 1483 Utrecht, Netherlands

Godefridus Yerwerd, O.S.B. (died Jan 1483) was a Roman Catholic prelate who served as Auxiliary Bishop of Utrecht (1476–1483) and Auxiliary Bishop of Osnabrück (1471–1476).

== Biography ==
Godefridus Yerwerd was ordained a priest in the Order of Saint Benedict. On 13 Feb 1471 he was appointed during the papacy of Pope Paul II as Auxiliary Bishop of Osnabrück and Titular Bishop of Tricale. On 28 Mar 1476, he was appointed during the papacy of Pope Sixtus IV as Auxiliary Bishop of Utrecht. He served as Auxiliary Bishop of Utrecht until his death in Jan 1483.

== See also ==
- Catholic Church in the Netherlands
