= Henricus van de Wetering =

Dutch Catholic bishop (1850–1929)

His Excellency Henricus van de Wetering
- Archbishop of Utrecht; Primate of the Netherlands
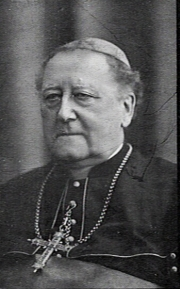
- Henricus van de Wetering
- Church: Roman Catholic
- Archdiocese: Utrecht
- Province: Netherlands
- See: Saint Catherine's Cathedral
- Installed: 2 July 1895
- Term ended: 18 November 1929
- Predecessor: Petrus Matthias Snickers
- Successor: Johannes Henricus Gerardus Jansen

Orders
- Ordination: 15 August 1874
- Consecration: 24 March 1895 by Caspar Josefus Martinus Bottemanne
- Rank: Archbishop

Personal details
- Born: 26 November 1850 Hoogland, Netherlands
- Died: 16 November 1929 (aged 78) Driebergen, Netherlands
- Denomination: Roman Catholic

Henricus van de Wetering (Dutch pronunciation: [ɦɛnˈrikʏs fɑn də ˈʋeːtərɪŋ]; (Note: Van in isolation is [vɑn].) 26 November 1850 – 18 November 1929) was a Dutch Catholic archbishop.

Van de Wetering was born on 25 November 1850 in Hoogland. He was appointed Titular Archbishop of Gaza and Coadjutor of the metropolitan see of Utrecht, on 8 February 1895. He was consecrated on 24 March 1895 at Hilversum, Church of Saint Vitus, by Caspar Josephus Bottemanne, Bishop of Haarlem. Five months later, upon the death of Archbishop Petrus Matthias Snickers, he succeeded him as Archbishop of Utrecht and Primate of the Netherlands, until his death on 18 November 1929.

== Notes ==
Catholic Church titles
Preceded by Petrus Matthias Snickers	Archbishop of Utrecht; 1895–1929	Succeeded by Johannes Henricus Gerardus Jansen
