= Archdiocese of Utrecht (Catholic) =

Archdiocese of the Catholic Church in the Netherlands

Metropolitan Archdiocese of Utrecht Archidioecesis Metropolitae Ultraiectensis Latinorum Aartsbisdom Utrecht

Catholic
- Coat of arms

Location
- Country: Netherlands
- Territory: Parts of the provinces Utrecht, Overijssel, Gelderland, and Flevoland
- Coordinates: 52°05′15″N 5°07′27″E

Statistics
- Area: 10,000 km^{2} (3,900 sq mi)
- Population: Total; Catholics: (as of 2020); ▲4,115,800; ▲762,100 (18.5%)

Information
- Denomination: Catholic
- Sui iuris church: Latin Church
- Rite: Roman Rite
- Established: 695, Archbishopric from 12 May 1559
- Cathedral: Saint Catherine's Cathedral
- Patron saint: Saint Willibrord

Current leadership
- Pope: Leo XIV
- Archbishop: Wim Eijk
- Auxiliary Bishops: Theodorus Cornelis Maria Hoogenboom; Herman Willebrordus Woorts
- Bishops emeritus: Johannes Antonius de Kok, Auxiliary Bishop Emeritus (1982–2005)

Map
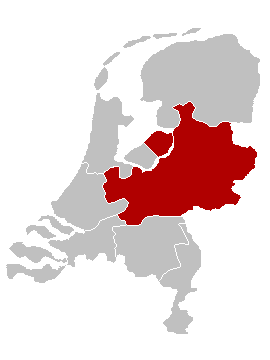
- The location of the Archdiocese of Utrecht in the Netherlands

Website
- aartsbisdom.nl

The Archdiocese of Utrecht (Latin: Archidioecesis Ultraiectensis; Dutch: Aartsbisdom Utrecht) is an archdiocese of the Latin Church (or Western Church) of the Catholic Church in the Netherlands. The Archbishop of Utrecht is the metropolitan of the ecclesiastical province of Utrecht. There are six suffragan dioceses of the province: Roman Catholic Dioceses of Breda, of Groningen-Leeuwarden, of Haarlem-Amsterdam, of Roermond, of Rotterdam, and of 's-Hertogenbosch. The cathedral church of the archdiocese is Saint Catherine's Cathedral, which replaced the prior cathedral, Saint Martin's Cathedral after it was taken by Protestants in the Reformation.

== History ==
The diocese was founded in 695.

In the Middle Ages, the bishops of Utrecht were also prince-bishops of the Prince-Bishopric of Utrecht within the Holy Roman Empire. The Prince-Bishopric of Utrecht must not be confused with the Diocese of Utrecht, which was larger than the Prince-Bishopric. Over the larger area outside the Prince-Bishopric, the bishop exercised only spiritual, not temporal, authority.

In 1580, the diocese was suppressed because of the rise of Protestantism. The Dutch Mission in various forms took care of the spiritual needs of Catholics in the former diocese of Utrecht until the modern archdiocese was established in 1853.

== List of archbishops from 1853 ==
=== Ordinaries ===
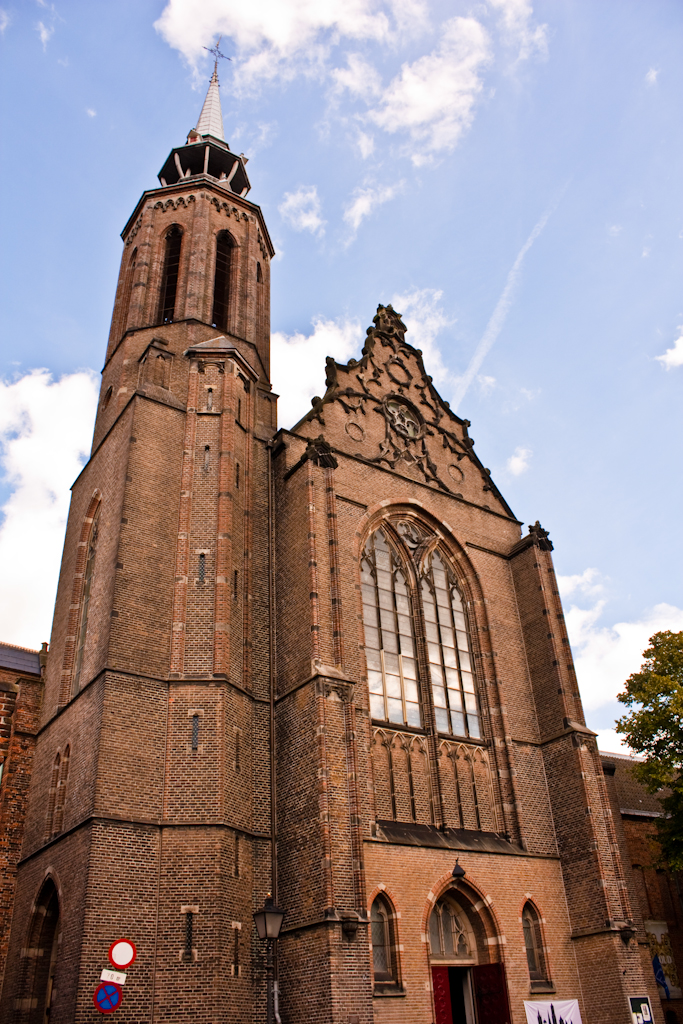
Saint Catherine's Cathedral in Utrecht

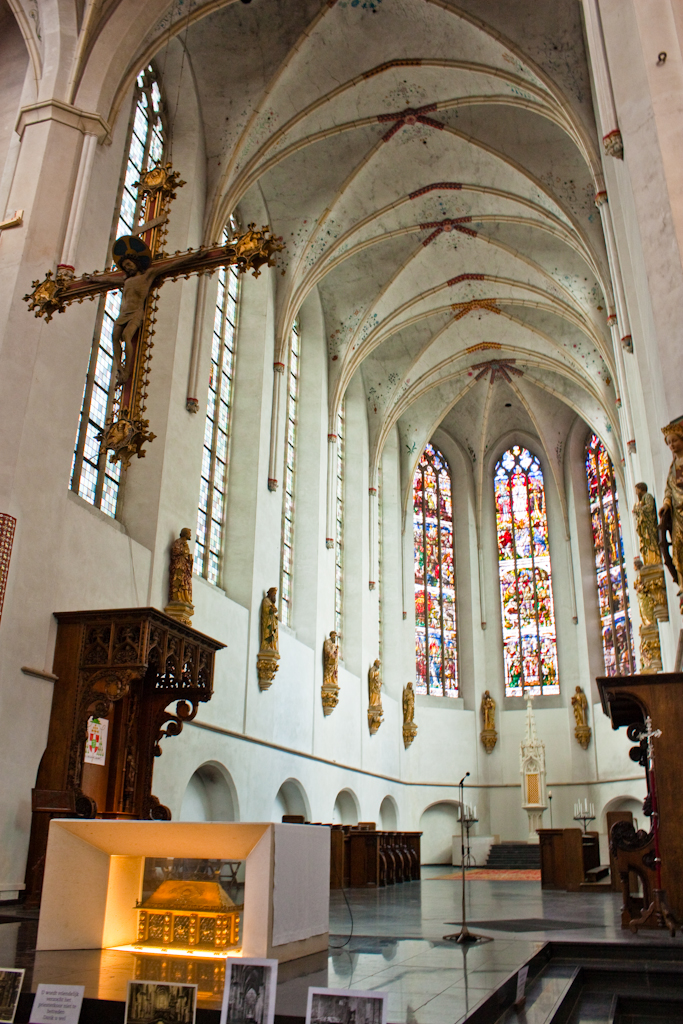
Saint Catherine's Cathedral in Utrecht

- Johannes Zwijsen (1853–1868)
- Andreas Ignatius Schaepman (1868–1882)
- Petrus Matthias Snickers (1883–1895)
- Henricus van de Wetering (1895–1929)
- Johannes Henricus Gerardus Jansen (1930–1936)
- Johannes de Jong (1936–1955) (created cardinal in 1946)
- Bernardus Johannes Alfrink (1955–1975) (created cardinal in 1960)
- Johannes Gerardus Maria Willebrands (1975–1983) (created cardinal in 1969)
- Adrianus Johannes Simonis (1983–2007) (created cardinal in 1985)
- Willem Jacobus Eijk (since 2007) (created cardinal in 2012)

Source: Radboud University Library.

=== Auxiliary bishops ===
- Goswin Haex van Loenhout, O. Carm. (15 May 1469 – 31 Mar 1475)
- Godefridus Yerwerd, O.S.B. (28 Mar 1476 – Jan 1483)
- Bonaventura Engelbertz van Oldenzeel, O.F.M. (30 Oct 1538 – 1539)
- Nicolas Van Nienlant (6 Jul 1541 – 10 Mar 1561), appointed Bishop of Haarlem; also known as Nicolaas Van Nieuwland
- Theodorus Gerardus Antonius Hendriksen (21 Jan 1961 – 9 Sep 1969)
- Johannes Bernardus Niënhaus (15 Jan 1982 – 1 Sep 1999)
- Johannes Antonius de Kok, O.F.M. (15 Jan 1982 – 27 Aug 2005)
- Gerard Johannes Nicolaus de Korte (11 Apr 2001 – 18 Jun 2008), appointed Bishop of Groningen-Leeuwarden
- Theodorus Cornelis Maria Hoogenboom 7 Dec 2009 – )
- Herman Willebrordus Woorts (7 Dec 2009 – )

== See also ==
- Timeline of Utrecht
- History of religion in the Netherlands
- Roman Catholicism in the Netherlands
- Religion in Belgium
- Religion in the Netherlands
