= Rijsenburg =

- Interactive map of Rijsenburg
- Coordinates: 52°2′37″N 5°15′11″E
- Country: Netherlands
- Province: Utrecht
- Municipality: Utrechtse Heuvelrug

Rijsenburg is a former village and municipality in the Dutch province of Utrecht. Presently, it is a part of the single town of Driebergen-Rijsenburg.

The former municipality of Rijsenburg existed from 1818 to 1931, when it merged with Driebergen, to create the new municipality of Driebergen-Rijsenburg. Since 2006, Driebergen-Rijsenburg has been part of the new municipality of Utrechtse Heuvelrug.
