= St Catherine's Cathedral, Utrecht =

Catholic cathedral in the Netherlands

St. Catherine's Cathedral
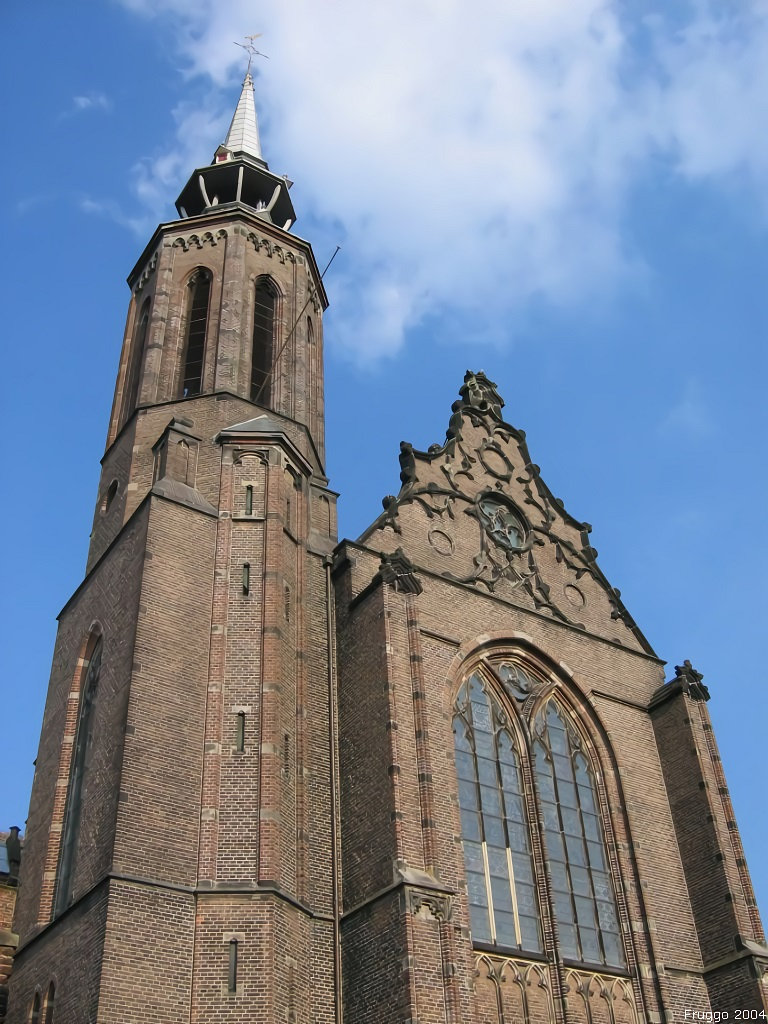

Religion
- Affiliation: Catholic Church
- Province: Archdiocese of Utrecht
- Ecclesiastical or organisational status: Cathedral
- Leadership: Archbishop of Utrecht

Location
- Location: Utrecht, Netherlands
- Interactive map of St. Catherine's Cathedral
- Coordinates: 52°05′15″N 5°07′27″E

Architecture
- Completed: ca. 1550

Website
- De Kathedraal

St. Catherine's Cathedral (Dutch: Sint-Catharinakathedraal), often referred to as Catharijnekerk (Dutch for 'Catherine's Church'), is a Catholic church dedicated to Saint Catherine of Alexandria situated in Utrecht in the Netherlands.

It was built as part of the Carmelite friary founded in 1456. After 1529, work on the building was continued by the Knights Hospitallers.

The large church was completed only in the middle of the 16th century. From 1580 to 1815 it was the home of a Protestant congregation. In 1815 it was returned to the Roman Catholics, first as a garrison church, then since 1842 as a parish church.

Since 1853 St. Catherine's Church has been the seat of the Archdiocese of Utrecht as St. Catherine's Cathedral, and is the Roman Catholic metropolitan church of the Netherlands. The former St. Martin's Cathedral remains a Protestant church. In 1898 architect Alfred Tepe began some major changes to the church. It was lengthened with the current western trave; the new facade was a copy of the old one which was possibly designed by Rombout Keldermans II. A tower, based on the tower of the town hall of Kampen, was added in 1900.

Some of the relics of Saint Willibrord, patron saint of the Benelux countries, are kept in the reliquary under the main altar.

Due to financial difficulties, in 2018, the parish board initially announced plans to close St. Catherine's Cathedral. On March 2, 2019, however, the parish board announced that this decision had been overturned by the Archbishop of Utrecht, Cardinal W.J. Eijk, due to a lack of support for the move among Catholic faithful and the national significance of Saint Catherine's as the Metropolitan Cathedral of the Dutch Church Province.

== See also ==
- St. Gertrude's Cathedral (The bishop-see of the Old-Catholic church in Utrecht)
- Museum Catharijneconvent
