= Consecrations and ordinations by René Vilatte =

René Vilatte (1854–1929), a French-born independent Catholic bishop active in France and the United States, consecrated a number of bishops and ordained several clergy during his career. Vilatte himself was ordained a priest in 1885 by Eduard Herzog of the Christian Catholic Church of Switzerland and was consecrated a bishop in 1892 in Colombo by Malankara bishops. He went on to consecrate Stephen Kaminski (1898), Paolo Miraglia (1900), Henry Marsh-Edwards (1903), Frederick Ebenezer Lloyd (1915), and George Alexander McGuire (1921), among others. His ordinations included Joseph Leycester Lyne in 1898 and the impostor Edward Rufane Donkin.

The International Old Catholic Bishops' Conference of the Union of Utrecht stated that it did not recognize the orders of Vilatte, Donkin, Kaminski, Miraglia, or those they consecrated. Ignatius Peter IV, the Syriac Orthodox Patriarch of Antioch, excommunicated Vilatte in 1898 for consecrating Kaminski contrary to Syriac Orthodox canon law, and a 1938 notice from the Syriac Orthodox Patriarchate repudiated all sects claiming succession through him. The Catholic Church excommunicated Vilatte but never made a formal pronouncement on the validity of his orders. He is regarded as a key figure in the history of episcopi vagantes, and later Gnostic churches drew on a succession passing through Louis-Marie-François Giraud and Jean Bricaud.

== Consecrations ==
Vilatte's "unilateral arrogation of status as an Old Catholic prelate did not, [...] reflect objective fact", according to Laurence Orzell, in Polish American Studies. The "European Old Catholics neither sanctioned his consecration nor approved of his attempt to spread Old Catholicism to America." After successive annual conferences of the priests and delegates from parishes, a proposal to elect a Polish suffragan bishop was approved, and in 1897 the convention chose Kaminski from Buffalo, New York. Kozlowski, a losing candidate from Chicago, called a second convention in Chicago, which elected him as bishop; Vilatte refused to recognise him. When Vilatte advised the Old Catholics against Kozlowski's consecration, his "ecclesiastical antics" were taken into account and they "probably regarded such advice as all the more reason to proceed with the consecration". Kozlowski traveled to Europe, and, on November 21, 1897, Herzog, Gul, and Theodor Weber elevated Kozlowski to the episcopate in Bern. Although Vilatte adherents saw a conspiracy, according to Orzell, it remains unclear if Grafton actively promoted Kozlowski's consecration. Herzog, who ordained Vilatte, assured Grafton, in 1898, that "a desire to counter the French 'rouge' served as a major motive behind the Chicago priest's consecration" and asked Grafton to support Kozlowski and "develop friendly relations with him".

=== Stephen Kaminski ===
Kaminski was born in West Prussia. According to Wacław Kruszka in Historya Polska w Ameryce, Kaminski did not attend any college, but learned how to play the organ from a local organist. After leaving the army, he forged official documents for which he received a two-year prison term. Upon his release, he emigrated to the United States where he clung to various priests as an organist. He felt called to the religious life and joined the Franciscan order in Pulaski, Wisconsin, but was expelled and moved to Manitowoc, Wisconsin, where he worked in various menial jobs. He was organist at the independent Sweetest Heart of Mary Church in Detroit, Michigan (which Vilatte consecrated in 1893) but later quarreled with and wrote in newspapers against the pastor, Dominic Hippolytus Kolasinski, and left.

When Vilatte visited Kolaszewski, his vicar general, in Cleveland, Ohio, to dedicate the Immaculate Heart of Mary Church building and cemetery on August 18, 1894, he ordained Kaminski. The dedication ceremonies were marred by a riot, caused by protesters in the streets, that included a stabbing and shooting.

In 1895, Kaminski and a faction of his adherents occupied the Polish parish church of St. Paul, a Catholic church of the Diocese of Omaha in South Omaha, Nebraska, where he conducted devotion "in his own way". (Note: A sense-for-sense translation of the Polish idiomatic expression "po swojemu" is "in his own way". The literal translation does not convey the meaning. See: Brooks, Maria Zagórska (1975). Polish Reference Grammar. Slavistic printings and reprintings., Text-book series. Vol. 2. The Hague: Mouton. p. 302. ISBN 978-9027933133.) Kaminski wounded a man and then shot at the altar to create the impression that he had also been shot at. Later that month, Kaminski was called "a Polish nationalist who posed as a priest" by Elia W. Peattie, in the Omaha World-Herald. She wrote that he "barricaded himself in the sanctuary and used firearms to retain control, wounding Xavier Dargaczewski and Frank Kraycki." Peattie quoted in her article: "The priest, he say: 'I never leave this town till I see the bare bones of this church!' And he is seein' 'em!" It was rumored he started the fire that burned the church, at the end of that month, to a pile of rubble and ashes; Kaminski's faction damaged fire hydrants so there was no way to extinguish the fire. Kaminski was arrested.

Kruszka described the Buffalo situation as being the same that took place in Omaha.

He wrote that, in June 1894, that Alfons Mieczysław Chrostowski's Jutrzenka, in Cleveland, printed that Kolaszewski and Wladyslaw Debski arrived in Buffalo to establish an independent parish.

Hieronim Kubiak wrote, in The Polish National Catholic Church in the United States of America from 1897 to 1980, that the first independent parishes in the United States were organized by German, Irish, and French Catholics. A "pattern of a parish conflict" was already in place when Poles set up their independent parishes. "As long as the conflict continued, the parish most often divorced itself from the jurisdiction of the accused bishop and stood independent of him, which did not mean that the parish did not consider itself belonging to the Catholic Church symbolized by the Pope. In the division with the bishops, the parish kept very strictly to the rules of the norm of religious life, finding in it a further support for the rightness of their cause." Return to the previous state of affairs, exist in isolation and then vanish, or create "a self-determined religious movement" are the three alternative results, according to Kubiak.

According to Kruszka, the causes of this "social ulcer" (Note: A literal translation of the Polish idiomatic expression wrzód społeczny.) can be found several years earlier when Poles began immigrating to Buffalo in large numbers. They had only one church prior to 1886; they built an additional church, without waiting for the permission of Bishop Stephen V. Ryan of the Catholic Diocese of Buffalo, but a storm demolished it; they demanded another church and only under pressure from the Congregation for Propagation of the Faith was a second church built. Even so, there was by this time resentment and bitterness among the people which created prejudices against the clergy. That "social ulcer" burst in 1895 when a group demanded that Ryan relinquish ownership and management of their church; Ryan did not agree to the conditions, so the rebels schismed from the Catholic Church and organized an independent parish.

Their parish did not develop at all, because everyone thought their pastor, Antoni Klawiter, was morally bankrupt. Klawiter eventually left, intent on reconciling with Rome, and Kaminski, who was according to Kruszka another notorious adventurer like Klawiter, replaced him. From 1896 until May 3, 1907, Kaminski was pastor of Holy Mother of the Rosary Parish in Buffalo. According to Kruszka, Kaminski once counted under his jurisdiction a parish in Buffalo, a parish in Chicopee, Massachusetts, and a parish in Baltimore, Maryland.

Kaminski failed to persuade Gul to raise him to the episcopate. Soon after, Kaminski was to be consecrated bishop by Vilatte, but this was delayed over the fee charged for consecration. It was deliberate and premeditated simony, the act of buying and selling an ecclesiastical office, Vilatte demanded money for the consecration but Kaminski did not have enough to give. Only after Vilatte was bankrupt and had sold his house and cathedral in Green Bay was he less demanding and agreed to consecrate Kaminski. Kaminski was consecrated, on March 20, 1898, by Vilatte as suffragan bishop for those Polish priests and parishes which accepted Vilatte's doctrinal reforms. In the end, he received $100 in cash from Kaminski and promissory notes for a few hundred dollars more. Kaminski threatened to take Grafton to court after Grafton publicly criticized him.

"Notices were sent out", according to Anson, that stated both Cardinal James Gibbons of Baltimore and Archbishop Sebastiano Martinelli, the apostolic delegate to the United States, "would assist at the ceremony. It is hardly necessary to add that neither of these prelates put in an appearance." However, the new bishop fled the United States to Canada because of creditors. He was excommunicated by Rome and he abandoned Vilatte.

Kaminski was consecrated after the 1889 establishment of the Old Catholic Churches' Union of Utrecht and its IBC, "the orders of episcopi vagantes in general, and specifically those of [...] Kaminski, [...] and of all those consecrated by them, are not recognized, and all connections with these persons is formally denied" by the IBC.

On September 9, 1898, Vilatte was excommunicated by Ignatius Peter IV for consecrating Kaminski in a way contrary to the canon law of the Syriac Orthodox Church of Antioch. Anson wrote that in his agreement with Alvares, Vilatte acknowledged that if he "deviated from their Canons and Rules, he would be subject to dismissal from the dignity of Metropolitan." Bishops were consecrated by Vilatte "without authority" from the Patriarch of the Syriac Orthodox Church of Antioch, who "therefore does not recognize such consecrations or their derivative consecrations and ordinations".

For both Kaminski and Kozlowski, according to Kubiak, "their movements became isolated in the Polonia community, not so much because of the propaganda of the RCC, but rather because of the public opinion negative assessment of the associations of Polonia toward the dissenters." Kubiak wrote:

There is no doubt that in many cases, [...] the same followers and inspirers of the independent parishes were activists in [...] unions and [...] the Socialist party. In any case, in many instances independent parishes and groups of the Polish Socialist Alliance arose at the same time. The social postulates, [...] even the language of their propaganda, seems to indicate to a large extent a convergence in the two movements, [...] (Note: See Wieczerzak, Joseph W (Autumn 1983). "Bishop Francis Hodur and the Socialists: associations and disassociations". Polish American Studies. 40 (2): 5–35. ISSN 0032-2806. JSTOR 20148131.)

Just before the Revolution in the Kingdom of Poland and wider Revolution of 1905 in the Russian Empire, Stanislaw Osada, in Historya Związku Narodowego Polskiego i rozwój ruchu narodowego Polskiego w Ameryce Północne, wrote in the United States, that Russian agents endeavored to draw believers into Old Catholicism, not for faith but for "implanting in the womb of Catholicism" (Note: A literal translation of the Polish idiomatic expression zaszczepienia w łonie katolicyzmu.) the basis for Polish discord, to facilitate the Russification of the Catholic Church. Kubiak quoted Osada: "There exists yet another danger, namely that in recent times the leaders of that movement (independent) quite unequivocally help spread among the Polish masses the slogans of the Revolutionary-Socialists." (Note: Edward Roslof wrote, in Red priests, that by 1905, renovationists in Saint Petersburg had an agenda for reform and joined with Christian Socialists to form the Union of Church Regeneration. "Orthodox adaptation of revolutionary rhetoric in 1905 disturbed the church leaders, who viewed it as incompatible with church teaching." Roslof quoted Sergei Bulgakov, that the reform "sought 'not only to renovate the church life, but even to create its new forms, almost a new religion' following the model of Martin Luther." According to Roslof, this "charge of creating a 'new religion' surfaced repeatedly.")

From 1898 to 1911 he edited and published a weekly Polish newspaper Warta, an organ of his independent church.

He died in Buffalo on September 19, 1911. After his death, the Buffalo center of the independent movement ceased to exist and most of his parishioners affiliated themselves with the Polish National Catholic Church (PNCC), the Scranton center of the independent movement.

=== Paolo Miraglia ===
Paolo Vescovo Miraglia-Gulotti was a priest from Ucria, Sicily, who in 1895 was sent into Piacenza, in Northern Italy, to preach the May sermons in honor of Mary; there he was embroiled in a series of either scandals or conspiracies. He opened his Oratorio di San Paolo, Chiesa Italiana Internationale Paulina Irby wrote, in National Review that it began in a former stable of an old palazzo with church furnishing principally provided by Mazzini's niece. His congregation had just that church, and "is spoken of contemptuously as the congregation of Signor Abbate's stable", she wrote, as the Abbate family own the palazzo.

On April 15, 1896, Miraglia, who resided in Piacenza but was a priest of the Catholic Diocese of Patti was excommunicated for, what was called, his "incredible, audacious, and obstinant scandals which long troubled the Catholic Diocese of Piacenza". That year, Nevin introduced in The Churchman the "modern Savonarola", Nevin wrote "he has placed himself under wise guidance, and will not be apt to do anything rashly or ignorantly" but failed to include any specifics. The following week, The Churchman only hinted at the secular side of that movement by publishing a story from Milan's Corriere della Sera which wrote: "The struggle is now not only religious, but civic. The partisans of the bishop will hear of no truce with the partisans of Miraglia, and whenever they can, remove them from the employments that they hold." Within a year, on August 31, 1897, he attended the 4th International Old Catholic Congress in Vienna.

By 1900, two reformation groups in Italy elected bishops for their churches: one group in Arrone elected Campello as its bishop and the other group in Piacenza elected Miraglia as its bishop. Campello was licensed in 1883 by Bishop Abram Newkirk Littlejohn, of the Episcopal Diocese of Long Island, to work as a priest "wherever there may be lawful opportunity" for Campello's reformation efforts in Italy, and by that time, Nevin already knew Campello for many years. Campello was elected bishop by a synod of his church in 1893 and asked Herzog for consecration, who in turn brought Campello's case to the IBC. The IBC refused to consecrate Campello in 1901, according to Oeyen, "because of his limited number of baptisms and marriages and his close relationships with Anglicans, Methodists, and Waldenses". The Church of Utrecht thought Campello was to Protestant.

Miraglia, by then a leader of reform in northern Italy, wrote to Vilatte regarding the movement and consecration. On May 6, 1900, while the Holy See examined Vilatte's case, he consecrated Miraglia in Piacenza. Miraglia was a popular speaker known for his relations with Ferdinando Bracciforti, who represented Milanese liberal Protestantism. According to Smit "the orders of episcopi vagantes in general, and specifically those of [...] Miraglia, and of all those consecrated by them, are not recognized, and all connections with these persons is formally denied" by the IBC.

On June 13, 1900, the Congregation of Universal Inquisition declared that major excommunication was incurred by both Miraglia and Vilatte. The next day, June 14, 1900, the Alexandria Gazette reported that his anti-Catholicism offended the sensibilities of an American Methodist Episcopal Church in Rome that the "majority of the Protestant congregation interrupted" his discourse "with angry protests against his abuse of the pulpit and the police were finally called to prevent an open riot". In 1901, Tony André Florence, in a report about the liberal movement in Italy presented to the International Council of Unitarian and Other Liberal Religious Thinkers and Workers in London, wrote that Miraglia's "desire to be at the head of a personal movement, after separating him from the Old Catholics whose ideas were akin to his, threw him suddenly into a false path." His consecration by Vilatte "lost him the sympathy of many, and his profession of faith completed their disappointment". Florence wrote that Miraglia's "reformatory movement, therefore, is now in suspense", after he was obliged to refuge abroad.

While the Anglo-Continental Society reported, in The Times, that although the "discreditable incident" of Miraglia "having arrogated to himself the dignity" of bishop-elect and his consecration happened, the work of the "real bishop-elect", Campello, was going on independently, with headquarters at Rome. It is unclear if the two juxtaposed groups were concurrent factions of one movement.

In 1904, the IBC refused to recognize Miraglia's consecration as valid when he presented himself to the sixth International Old Catholic Congress in Olten, Switzerland.

Already a convicted fugitive who evaded Italian justice, Miraglia was then involved with religious associations in France. For example, a parish church in Piedigriggio, Corsica, was confiscated by the government from the Catholic Diocese of Ajaccio and devolved to a religious association formed on December 11, 1906. The parish's priest disappeared after he signed a declaration of adherence to the sect. From May, 1907, Jacques Forcioli, a Miraglia ordained priest working for that religious association, conducted schismatic services. In November, a lawsuit was filed by a replacement priest appointed to serve the parish by the Bishop of Ajaccio, against the mayor and Forcioli, demanding the restitution of the church. The court rendered a judgment which condemned the mayor, declared that religious association illegal, and ordered restoration of the property to the Catholic Church's priest.

Miraglia intended to ordain a priest for Christmas there; but he fled and evaded a French deportation order against him on Christmas Eve. A few days later Forcioli was arrested for stealing items from the church; the mayor and members of the sect were arrested for complicity. Fearing assassination, the mayor refused to implement the restitution on February 25, 1908. Finally, the Court of Appeal in Bastia dismissed Forcioli and restored exclusive possession of the Piedigriggio church property back to the Catholic Church's priest. On March 14, 1908, La Croix emphasized that the scope of the Bastia decision was of special importance, not only because it was the first judgment on the subject, but also because of the principles of law it invoked.

Vilatte and Miraglia united in a joint effort, and except for the brief interval, c. 1906 – c. 1907, when Vilatte unsuccessfully attempted to organize a religious association in France, their work had chiefly been in the Midwestern United States. According to Thomas E. Watson, in Watson's Jeffersonian Magazine, after being "arrested like a common criminal" Miraglia was deported from the United States, on August 4, 1910, "as though he were [...] an enemy to society." Two days before his deportation, the New York Times reported that Miraglia, "self-appointed head" of the Catholic Independent Church of Rome, was detained on Ellis Island "on the charge that he is an undesirable citizen" after being apprehended in Springfield, Massachusetts. He admitted that "while in Piacenza and Parma he served several terms and was heavily fined for libel, and while a professor at the Patti University he forged the signatures of [f]aculty to fake diplomas, which he sold to deficient students." On February 15, 1915, The Evening World reported that he was "charged with obtaining alms under false pretenses", after the Bureau of Charities went to his mission and "found only an empty shack", and arrested along with two of his alleged accomplices by detectives. While in court, a Deputy United States Marshal arrested him "on the charge of writing vicious letters" to a woman.

=== Others ===
Over the next few years Vilatte, according to Joanne Pearson in Wicca and the Christian Heritage, "carried on travelling and consecrating, truly a 'wandering bishop'".

In the middle of 1903, Vilatte was back in South Wales and he raised Henry Marsh-Edwards, a former Anglican priest, to the episcopate with the title of Bishop of Caerleon. The next day both men consecrated Henry Bernard Ventham with the title of Bishop of Dorchester.

The Church of England (CoE) found Marsh-Edwards to be "incapable of holding preferment" after he was required to "answer charges against his moral character". Although Marsh-Edwards was married, Vilatte consecrated him as a bishop. Mandatory clerical celibacy was required by Old Catholics, according to Oeyen, in Switzerland until 1876, in Germany until 1878, and in the Union of Utrecht until 1922. Margrander explains that this third episcopal consecration, of Marsh-Edwards, conferred by Vilatte is noteworthy because the bishop-elect was not celibate; Vilatte's precedent was followed by Gul in consecrating Arnold Mathew several years later. Mathew, a former Catholic priest who resigned and left the Church, was married by the CoE. (Note: Smit explained that in 1913, "ties of the IBC with Mathew were formally severed", and after World War I, the IBC "distanced itself more from the 'episcopus vagans' Mathew and those ordained and consecrated by him." Consecrations derived from Mathew were not recognised by the IBC. After Mathew died in 1919, the IBC declared in 1920 that Mathew's "consecration was obtained mala fide and that consequently it is null and void.")

"It is probable", Anson noted, that Vilatte consecrated Carmel Henry Carfora in 1907. "But there is no documentary evidence", he added, of the event.

In 1913, Vilatte consecrated Victor von Kubinyi in South Bend, Indiana.

=== Frederick Lloyd ===
Frederick Ebenezer John Lloyd was elected coadjutor bishop of the Episcopal Diocese of Oregon in 1905. Nelson Crawford wrote, in American Mercury, that some laity opposed Lloyd's election and sent a letter containing "numerous objections" to the hierarchy. The letter was influential and Lloyd withdrew his name from consideration. He was not confirmed and was not consecrated by the Protestant Episcopal Church of America (PECUSA).

In 1907, Lloyd was degraded from the priesthood by Bishop Cortlandt Whitehead of the Episcopal Diocese of Pittsburgh and converted to the RCC that year. In 1909, he reverted to the PECUSA. He was a member of the Illinois legislature.

Vilatte's sect was incorporated in 1915 in Illinois under the name American Catholic Church (ACC); Lloyd was an incorporator along with Vilatte and René Louis Zawistowski. Vilatte consecrated Lloyd later that year.

At the conclusion of the service Vilatte said to Lloyd:

It needs no prophet to foretell for you and the American Catholic Church a great future in the Providence of God. The need for a Church both American and Catholic, and free from paparchy and all foreign denomination, has been felt for many years by Christians of all the denominations. May your zeal and apostolic ministry be crowned with success.

He succeeded Vilatte as head of the ACC in 1920.

According to Brandreth, Lloyd proselytized and the spread of the ACC was "largely due to his initiative".

Lloyd founded his Order of Antioch (OoA), which was, according to Douglas, a group for Anglican clergy who were ordained by Lloyd. According to Douglas, Lloyd created a "loose organization in which he was looked to as the central episcopus vagans" that consisted to a greater degree of "an underground clientèle of Anglican clergymen" who were members of the OoA and to a lesser degree of churches. Douglas noted that the OoA attracted "an appreciable, if not large, membership, which was diffused all over England" but did not include an estimate of its membership.

Lloyd's assistant, John Churchill Sibley, who Lloyd consecrated in 1929, spread the OoA, surreptitiously according to Douglas. From about 1928 until 1934, Lloyd and Sibley used Saint Sarkis' Armenian Apostolic Church in London. In 1934, the Armenian priest informed his hierarchy, after being apprised by Douglas, that the Syriac Orthodox Church had repudiated Vilatte's apostolic succession; the Armenian Patriarch of Jerusalem then instructed its priest "to cease all relations with Sibley and the Order".

Lloyd and Sibley together operated a parallel business entity, called the "Intercollegiate University" (IU), in which Lloyd was president and Sibley was chancellor. According to the 1924 Year Book of the Churches, "in order to establish a legal bond with the American Catholic Church", the College of Church Musicians (CoCM) was reorganized and incorporated as IU in Illinois.

=== George Alexander McGuire ===
George Alexander McGuire was an Antiguan and a baptized Anglican who graduated from a Moravian theological seminary and served as a Moravian Church pastor on Saint Croix, U.S. Virgin Islands. He was married and had one daughter. After he immigrated to the United States in 1894, during the nadir of American race relations, he was eventually ordained as a priest in the Episcopal Church.

After various assignments, from 1905 he held "the highest position open to a black man serving the church within the United States" as Bishop William Montgomery Brown's archdeacon for colored work in the Episcopal Diocese of Arkansas. The General Convention of the Episcopal Church in the United States of America considered proposals for the creation of black bishops, either in missionary districts independent of local dioceses or as suffragan bishops of local dioceses. Brown, a proponent of social Darwinism, proposed that black people should be racially segregated into a separate denomination. Theodore Natsoulas wrote, in Journal of Religion in Africa, that McGuire wrote an addendum to a diocesan annual report which endorsed Brown's "Arkansas Plan".

Hein and Shattuck point out that Brown later apostatized and became a Communist; his "extreme theological and social views" eventually led to his removal. As Brown's archdeacon, "under his own initiative, he attempted to enact Brown's plan" but, according to Bains, McGuire seemed to have preferred the alternative missionary districts plan and "was frustrated by the racism of the Episcopal Church". Natsoulas thought that McGuire "probably came away from Arkansas with the idea of an independent black church."

McGuire later received a Doctor of Medicine and served as rector in the United States and on Antigua. In New York, he joined Marcus Garvey's Universal Negro Improvement Association (UNIA) and the African Communities League in 1919, and was elected its chaplain-general the next year. While affiliated for a short time with the Reformed Episcopal Church, when McGuire established the Church of the Good Shepherd, he and his congregation became part of the Independent Episcopal Church which was renamed the African Orthodox Church (AOC). According to David Hein and Gardiner Shattuck, in The Episcopalians, McGuire created the African Orthodox Church "along the lines of what the Conference of Church Workers and Brown had previously proposed." (Note: See White, Gavin (June 1969). "Patriarch McGuire and the Episcopal Church". Historical Magazine of the Protestant Episcopal Church. Vol. 38, no. 2. Church Historical Society. pp. 109–141. ISSN 0018-2486.) Garvey did not want a hierarchical church like McGuire created.

While Bains called it only "a brief period of estrangement" from Garvey, McGuire actually became involved in a rival organization, the African Blood Brotherhood for African Liberation and Redemption (ABB).

According to Rochell Isaac and Louis Parascandola, in Encyclopedia of African American History, 1896 to the Present, the ABB was a Marxist communist and black nationalist secret society founded by Cyril Briggs in Harlem, New York. It was an African American self-defense "response to the violent race riots of the Red Summer of 1919" and the Ku Klux Klan. Parascandola called it a "secret paramilitary group". According to Isaac, much early ABB history is not documented but she wrote it was inspired by the Irish Republican Brotherhood. Many of its leaders were Caribbean immigrants and its council joined Comintern. Briggs, editor of the Amsterdam News, was fired by that newspaper for his support of an "autonomous black nation within the United States". "The ABB saw racism as an offshoot of capitalism and viewed Marxism as the solution to the race problem."

James Oneal wrote, in American Communism, that it, the ABB, (Note: Oneal calls the organization African Black Brotherhood instead of African Blood Brotherhood.) appeared some time in 1921 and was used to attract blacks to the Communist movement. McGuire, who had been active in the UNIA, according to Oneal, "became a prominent leader in the new organization". Mark Solomon wrote, in The Cry Was Unity, it "enjoyed a burst of good fortune in the fall of 1921 when three UNIA leaders" including McGuire "bolted to the ABB" but "did not widen its ideological appeal". The AOC "took great pains to demonstrate his legitimacy". Natsoulas wrote that it "was important to its mission that the new church be founded on solid grounds" and quoted McGuire's words that "[t]he Negro everywhere must control his own ecclesiastical organization" yet hold the Apostolic traditions.

He was refused consecration by Episcopal, Catholic, and Russian Orthodox bishops. About the same time, on September 28, 1921, Vilatte consecrated McGuire. The ABB, according to Solomon, contemplated a secret army with weapons "smuggled into Africa by men 'in the guise of missionaries, etc.' as a prelude to gradual liberation of the continent." But, Jeannette Jones writes, in In Search of Brightest Africa, that the ABB had a flawed understanding of missionaries because, in fact, the "colonial powers distrusted many black missionaries as race agitators". By the end of 1923 the ABB was no longer an "independent political organization" as it merged with the Workers Party of America; and, it was dissolved in 1925.

McGuire believed that apostolic succession was "essential to authenticate the claims of the AOC". According to Bains, however, "the questionable authenticity of Vilatte's consecrations haunted their relations with other churches." For example, although three months after being raised to the episcopate, McGuire was granted an audience with Patriarch Meletius IV of Constantinople in New York City, but the AOC "never gained the desired recognition from a major Eastern Orthodox Church." Bains concluded that McGuire "remained a marginal figure in both the church and predominantly Protestant black America" even with his "claim to apostolic succession that few recognized".

== Ordinations ==
=== Edward Donkin ===
Edward Rufane Donkin (Note: This is the name used in his extradition file at The National Archives online catalog.) was an infamous impostor with worldwide notoriety. He represented himself, at different times, as D Benedetto, Comte Benedetto Donkin, Lord Cortenay, Benedict Donkin, the cousin of the Earl of Minto, the son of the Duke of Devon. "In the world's long roll of impostors a prominent place must always be found for 'the Right Rev. Edward Rufane Benedict Donkin, Bishop of Santa Croce, and Vicar Apostolic of the Independent Roman Catholic Church'", begins his obituary in Adelaide's The Chronicle, who committed "a series of frauds" resulting in several imprisonments. Vilatte ordained Donkin. Years later, in 1904, while he represented himself as an Old Catholic Church bishop, (Note: For details discrediting Donkin's alleged consecration, including the May 4, 1906 Spanish language text of the Bishop of Tamaulipas, Giuseppe Ignazio Eduardo Sánchez Camacho's statement refuting Donkin, with an English translation, see "The late Bishop of Santa Croce". Truth. 59 (1537): 1423–1425. June 13, 1906. LCCN sf85009847.) Donkin started "what [was] purported to be an Old Catholic Benedictine Oratory" in a house previously "occupied by genuine Benedictines" and "opened almost entirely on credit". By August, "the bubble burst", Warren Fisher, who guaranteed the furnishings, discovered he had been swindled. Donkin "represented that he had been appointed by the Old Catholic Conference as their bishop at Oxford at a salary of £400 a year and that he produced what purported to be the official record of his appointment." Donkin induced him "to guarantee the bill for the furnishing of the Oratory" with a forged check and Fisher was left to pay his guarantee. Fisher then wrote to Vilatte, he responded, and Fisher forwarded his letter to Truth which published it.

Vilatte wrote that when Donkin came to him in 1896, "he posed as 'The Rev Fr Dominic, OSA, Church of England Missioner, St Augustine's Priory, London,' and as such he was asked by the Protestant Episcopal clergy of Milwaukee to preach in their cathedral." And, as Vilatte wrote, "I was completely blinded and did ordain him to the priesthood" but "[a]bout eighteen months afterwards his true character was discovered, and I deposed and degraded him". Vilatte explained that a member of his clergy, who he noted was also "humbugged and swindled", introduced him to the impostor, the alias Lord Cortenay, son of the Duke of Devon; that "he 'took in' the clergy of Milwaukee"; that "Donkin never belonged to any 'community' in our Church"; but, Vilatte did not explain why he ordained Donkin, who he thought was a CoE cleric. Vilatte wrote that later Donkin "posed as a Bishop in Cleveland." (Note: Vilatte wrote to Fisher: "I desire to say that you could take much information about him by reading Truth, of London, of August 4, 1904, and especially the number of September 22, 1904, pages 707 and 708.")

According to Smit "the orders of episcopi vagantes in general, and specifically those of [...] Donkin, [...] and of all those consecrated by them, are not recognized, and all connections with these persons is formally denied" by the IBC.

=== Joseph Lyne ===
Vilatte first visited Frederick George Lee of the Order of Corporate Reunion. Lee gave Vilatte a letter of introduction to Lyne.

While Vilatte traveled to Paris to consult with advisers, he interrupted his journey to ordain Joseph Leycester Lyne and another monk at the Anglican Llanthony monastery near Capel-y-ffin, Wales, and the ruins of Llanthony Priory; on July 27, 1898, Lyne, an ordained deacon in the CoE but "unable to receive orders in his own church" for over three decades, was ordained priest by Vilatte. Rene Kollar wrote, in Oxford Dictionary of National Biography, that "for a time" Lyne "dreamed of establishing a British Old Catholic church." Years earlier, in 1890–1891, while Lyne was on his tour of North America raising funds for his work in England, The Cambrian wrote that his order "is not a Catholic Order, nor a Church of England exactly, but an offshoot of the High Church movement associated with the idea of a revival of the [a]ncient British Church"—which Pearson calls a "literary fantasm"—and his abbey church conducts some services in Welsh. The Cambrian noted that had Lyne addressed the 1889 National Eisteddfod of Wales, in Brecon, on behalf of the Welsh language and of the Ancient British Church and also admitted a Druid, taking the bardic name Dewi Honddu, by the Archdruid David Griffith, also known by his bardic name Clwydfardd; and had spoken for the rights of the Ancient Welsh Church at the English Church Congress held at Cardiff, by the permission of the Bishop of Llandaff.

Pearson argues that "concern with ancient, indigenous religions emerging and operating independently of the Church of Rome characterises the heterodox Christian churches of the episcopi vagantes in England, Wales and France" and "was a theme that was to influence the development of Druidry and Wicca." She believes, based on accounts published during his tour of him being the "Druid of the Welsh Church" and "belonging to an Ancient British Church, older than any except Antioch and Jerusalem", Lyne may have been part of another episcopus vagans', Richard Williams Morgan, recreated Ancient British Church, given its overtones of Welsh nationalism and links to neo-druidism.It was, according to Desmond Morse-Boycott, in Lead, Kindly Light, his accepting ordination "at the hands of a wandering [O]ld Catholic bishop, who was an adventurer" that discredited him with the CoE which "denied him the priesthood".

In 1909, after Lyne's death, two surviving Anglican monks, Asaph Harris and Gildas Taylor, were ordained, in Winnipeg, Manitoba, Canada, where Vilatte was staying during a visit of his missions in that part of North America. Both monks eventually joined the Benedictines of Caldey Island where Aelred Carlyle was Abbot and later Anson was a member.

=== William Brothers ===
Grafton was a founding member of the Society of St. John the Evangelist who "had strong ideas about the importance of communities of men and their significant contributions to the church" and his "influence on the growth of the religious life", according to Rene Kollar on Project Canterbury, "extended across the Atlantic". Charles Wood, 2nd Viscount Halifax, wanted Grafton to install Carlyle as abbot of the monastic community living as guests on Halifax's estate in Painsthorpe. On his return travel from Russia in 1903, Grafton visited Halifax in Painsthorpe where he installed Carlyle and ordained him a subdeacon; and the next year, 1904, Grafton ordained Carlyle a priest during a secret but officially documented ceremony in Ripon, Wisconsin.

Both Carlyle and Grafton wanted to establish an Anglican Benedictine brotherhood in Grafton's diocese. Several men expressed an interest, but Anson wrote that Brothers was not among a few Americans at Carlyle's monastery. It is unclear what happened next but, according to Kollar, Carlyle's involvement stopped in 1904. "Apparently little or no contact existed between Carlyle's brotherhood and his American counterpart", noted Kollar. By 1908, Father Herbert Parrish, a PECUSA priest in good standing, was prior of the Anglican Benedictine monastery of St. John the Baptist in Fond du Lac. (Note: The 1908 issue of Living Church Annual lists what appears to be one order, contained in the list of recognized religious orders, of two groups with two different priors and no abbot: one in Fond du Lac, and another in Greens Farms, Connecticut. The 1909 issue lists what appears to be one order, contained in the list of recognized religious orders, of one monastery with one prior and Grafton as abbot. Anson mistakenly wrote that Living Church Annual did not reference the Fond du Lac monastery after 1909. The 1910 issue lists what appears to be one order, but no longer contained in the list of recognized religious orders, of one monastery with one prior and Grafton as abbot. The 1911 issue lists neither an order nor a monastery. The 1912 issue does not list the order but does list a monastery with one prior and Grafton as abbot; the 1913 issue, published after Grafton's death, was the same as 1912 but without an abbot. From 1914 onward, neither a Benedictine monastery nor a Benedictine order were listed.) Anson wrote, in The American Benedictine Review, that after Parrish left, it "appears that his followers were replaced or displaced by a group of young men who had been formed into a Benedictine brotherhood" by Brothers in Waukegan, Illinois, located outside Grafton's Diocese of Fond du Lac.

A "rented-house was named St. Dunstan's Abbey" with Grafton self-appointed as "their absentee Abbot"; it was not a monastery listed in the Living Church Annual.

According to Anson, Vilatte ordained Brothers c. 1910 – c. 1911 and later deposed him.

Anson was not certain whether this group was an Anglican religious order, "for by 1911 they were styling themselves 'Old Catholics'". Brothers' group, of about five members, was brought into the remaining part of the POCC, then under the jurisdiction Bishop Jan Tichy in 1911. (Note: It is unclear if Tichy was consecrated a bishop; there is no consensus about who consecrated him. Anson wrote that "brief references to Bishop Tichy" are contained in [Anglican and Foreign Church Society (1907). "Report and accounts". London: Society for Promoting Christian Knowledge. OCLC 54506697. ]. But, in 1904, the IBC refused Kozlowski's request to consecrate Tichy after Kozlowski presented him as his vicar general at the sixth International Old Catholic Congress in Olten, Switzerland. Congruously, Anson and Brandreth also quote OKKN Bishop Casparus Johannes Rinkel, of Haarlem, who wrote that Tichy was never appointed or acknowledged as bishop. Ronald Sadlowski's opinion, in Polish American Studies, was that Kozlowski "seems to have consecrated" Tichy between 1904 and 1907. Anson thought "it may have been Kozlowski." Theodore Andrews, in The Polish National Catholic Church in America and Poland, stated that Kozlowski did not consecrate any bishops in the US.)

Brothers was consecrated by Bishop Rudolph de Landas Berghes in 1916 and later deposed by him, for what "appears to have been" to Brandreth, "on the grounds that at the time of the consecration he had not, in fact, received the Orders of deacon and priest."

=== Other ordinations ===
On June 21, 1907, Vilatte ordained Louis-Marie-François Giraud, a Trappist monk excommunicated from the Catholic Church for dabbling in magic and the occult.

Shortly after Giraud's ordination, Cardinal François-Marie-Benjamin Richard, Archbishop of Paris, warned about apostate priests who were celebrating Mass under cover of a religious association directed by Vilatte. Richard said,

this plot hatched in the silence characteristic of masonry will not succeed. Catholics will not let themselves be deceived. Clemenceau and Briand may rob us of our churches, but not our consciences.

He then excommunicated Vilatte a second time.
