= Old Roman Catholic =

Old Roman Catholic may refer to:

- Old Roman Catholic Church in Great Britain
- Old Roman Catholic Church of America
- North American Old Roman Catholic Church

== See also ==
- Old Catholic Church
- Roman Catholic (term)
