= American Catholic Church (1915) =

Immigrant church expanding amid modernization and anti-Catholicism

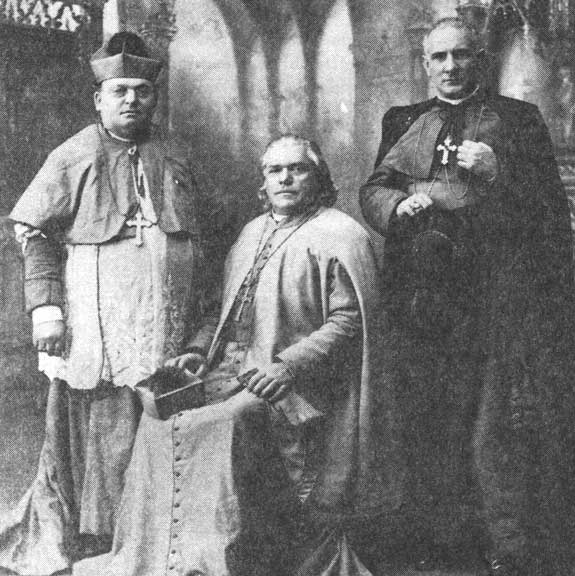
Bishops of the American Catholic Church: Stephen Kaminski (Polish), Joseph René Vilatte (French), Paolo Miraglia-Gulotti (Italian)

The American Catholic Church (ACC) was an Independent Old Catholic denomination founded in 1915. Though the original members no longer exist, many groups have made claims to its lineage through the consecrations of Paolo Miraglia-Gulotti and Frederick Ebenezer Lloyd.

== Origin ==
Joseph René Vilatte founded his independent Christian denomination, American Catholic Church (ACC), soon after he was consecrated. According to The New York Times, Edward Randall Knowles was Vilatte's first ordination. The 1892 article called the two, Vilatte and Knowles, the hierarchy of the ACC. That ACC had a schism when Knowles desired to be consecrated a bishop. Vilatte wrote to The New York Times, that he had "been pestered with applications from clergymen of other churches for episcopal consecration." He says he "would render [him]self ridiculous," wrote Vilatte, "were I to proceed to consecrate Bishops in a hurry." Vilatte rejected Knowles' request and Knowles resigned. Vilatte explained that three canonical conditions were not met:

- Vilatte was alone, "and the law of the Church is that there should be at least three Bishops to consecrate another"
- Knowles was married, "whereas in all the Eastern churches a Bishop must be a monk"
- Knowles was too young, he "has not attained the canonical age"

Vilatte complained against attempts to force him "to act against" his "better judgment" and declared: "I am, and intend to remain, faithful to the laws of our orthodox Church."

Vilatte was mocked, in The Sacred Heart Review, as being the "sole proprietor and General Manager of the new Old Catholic Church in America" confronted by a schism. While the "great 'neatness and despatch'" of Knowles' ordination was ridiculed and his judgment, for "resigning from his church because he can't be a bishop all at once", was questioned. "Knowles may ask, [what] is the use of having a [...] church of your own if you are going to let the rules stand in your way?".

Knowles was a Baptist convert to the RCC, he graduated from Princeton University, studied Christian Science for a time, interviewed Joseph Leycester Lyne, corresponded with Antonio Francisco Xavier Alvarez, Pedro Manoel Lisboa Pinto, Eduard Herzog and others. He was prepared to sail to Europe to consult with Hyacinthe Loyson, Herzog, and the Old Catholic Church of the Netherlands (OKKN) OKKN about the feasibility or desirability of starting missions in America. He abandoned his trip and waited for Vilatte. They met in Philadelphia, Pennsylvania, and Knowles was ordained in West Sutton, Massachusetts.

On June 20, 1893, The New York Times published that Knowles had received a letter from Loyson. "The letter shows that the Old Catholic Episcopate in Europe have sided with [...] Knowles as against [...] Vilatte, and have entirely repudiated him."

The name "American Catholic Church" was also used, from 1894, by a group of Polish parishes, at first associated with Vilatte, which were organized at Immaculate Heart of Mary Church in Cleveland, Ohio.

On February 11, 1895, The New York Times reported that Knowles was a guest at Holland House, London and was "a priest of the Old Catholic or Syrian Church" who will in Egypt "study the Coptic and Greek systems". It further reported that, "There is a feeling among the Old Catholics and others who sympathize with them that the present administration of the Church is not vigorous or progressive enough. Hardly any advance has been made since the consecration of Archbishop Vilatte [...] Negotiations were carried on with disaffected Polish Catholics [...] but they failed [...] through a lack of discretion and tact." It went on to report that the "facts will be laid before the Patriarch by Knowles" and that reforms will be suggested. "In point of fact", Orzell wrote, "most Polish dissidents proved more willing to make use of Vilatte's episcopal services at blessings and confirmations than to accept his leadership and embrace his curious blend of Eastern and Western Christian theology." Margrander wrote that Poles did not accept Vilatte's doctrinal reforms so he withdrew his approval of their movement; he also wrote that Vilatte was convinced that their motive was a "deliberate defiance of the canonical authority" of their bishops, rather than reform, so he "advised them either to accept fully and freely the Old Catholic principles, or to return to the Roman Church."

Statistics about Vilatte's Old Catholic Church (OCC) sect showed its tiny size. Henry Carroll's The Religious Forces of the United States Enumerated, Classified, and Described, summarized United States census data from 1890 to 1910. It showed the OCC had at most three minister, five edifices and 700 members; Moreover, the 1910 United States census data showed that prior to 1910, the OCC disintegrated and ceased to exist; Carroll wrote that "a number of denominations, all quite small, have disappeared, including [...] the Old Catholic Church, and other insignificant bodies." Carroll's summaries did not list a sect named "American Catholic Church".

In 1910, Vilatte founded the American Catholic Church in Buffalo. The council of oversight included Vilatte, Kaminski, and Miraglia who agreed:

- a council of churches open to all persons having their residence in this country, whatever may be their nationality;
- united in the fidelity to the true faith in our Lord Jesus Christ, who is the sole Head of the Universal Church and our High Priest;
- imbued with the American Spirit of democracy and liberty;
- a branch or section of the true (Christian) Catholic Church of God, with its own Synod and Conference of Bishops.

Partially self-reported statistics about Vilatte's denominations were included in the United States Census Bureau's Religious Bodies, 1916 edition. They show two denominations associated with Vilatte were grouped under the name "Old Catholic Churches". The report also compiled statistics about similar types of denominations, though not ecclesiastically connected, which the report identified as the Polish National Catholic Church (PNCC) and the Lithuanian National Catholic Church (LNCC). (Note: The "Polish National Catholic Church" is also known as the "Polish National Catholic Church of America" and formerly known as the "Polish National Church of America",)

Of the two denominations under Vilatte's leadership, the first was the Old Roman Catholic Church (ORCC) with an episcopal see in Chicago, Illinois. (Note: The "Old Roman Catholic Church" is also known as the "Old Roman Catholic Church of America".) Miraglia was associated with this organization and had special charge of Italian services. It was in close fellowship with the ACC but a distinct organization. No report was made of this denomination in 1906, although some churches had been registered previous to that time. It claimed 12 organizations, with a membership of 4,700 with 11 church edifices. There were four organizations reporting parsonages. Of the 12 organizations, two, with 850 members, reported the use of English only in church services, and 10, with 3,850 members, the use of foreign languages only. The principal language reported was Polish, reported by three organizations, with 1,700 members; Lithuanian by one organization, with 325 members; Russian, used by one church, with 1,000 members; and, Portuguese, reported by three organizations, with 550 members. The number of ministers identified with the church was 14.

Of the two denominations under Vilatte's leadership, the second was the ACC with an episcopal see in Chicago. It was incorporated in 1915 in Illinois. Lloyd was associated with this organization. The denomination was formed for the special purpose of bringing Roman Catholics into the Old Catholic movement. It was in close fellowship with the ORCC but a distinct organization. This denomination was reported for the first time in 1916. It claimed three organizations, with a membership of 475 with one church edifice. There was one organization reporting a parsonage. English was reported as the only language used in church services in this denomination. The number of ministers identified with the church was seven.

After Vilatte retired as head of the ACC in 1920, Lloyd was chosen by a synod of that church to replace him; that synod gave Vilatte the honorary title of Exarch. According to the Year Book of the Churches, 1923 edition, Vilatte continued as head of the ORCC.

A third denomination grouped under the name "Old Catholic Churches" was the Catholic Church of North America (CCoNA). (Note: Formerly known as the "Catholic Church of North America", the "Old Catholic Church in America" was later known as the "Orthodox Old Catholic Church in America".) was not under Vilatte's leadership but under Bishop William Henry Francis Brothers' with an episcopal see in Waukegan, Illinois. This church was also reported for the first time in 1916. It claimed six organizations; 9,025 members with five church edifices. There were two organizations reporting parsonages. Of the six organizations one, with 725 members, reported the use of English only in church services; one, with 600 members, reported Slavic and English; and four, with 7,700 members, the use of foreign languages only. The principal language reported was Italian, reported by three organizations, with 7,400 members; Polish by one organization, with 300 members. The number of ministers identified with the church was 12. (Note: For Catholic Church of North America 1916 statistics compiled by United States Census Bureau see "Organizations, members, places of worship, and value of church property, by states: 1916" table.)

The LNCC was organized by Bishop Stanislaus B. Mickiewicz with an episcopal see in Lawrence, Massachusetts. (Note: He was previously a PNCC priest. He was consecrated by Rudolph de Landas Berghes in 1917 and deposed by both de Landas and Carmel Henry Carfora in 1918. Mickiewicz's consecration was derived from Mathew; therefore not recognised by the IBC. Smit explained that in 1913, "ties of the IBC with Mathew were formally severed", and after World War I, the IBC "distanced itself more from the 'episcopus vagans' Mathew and those ordained and consecrated by him." Consecrations derived from Mathew were not recognised by the IBC. After Mathew died in 1919, the IBC declared in 1920 that Mathew's "consecration was obtained mala fide and that consequently it is null and void.") It was in some type of connection, though not ecclesiastically, with the ORCC. This church was reported for the first time in 1916. It claimed seven organizations; 7,343 members with six church edifices. There was one organization reporting a parsonage. The only language reported in the conduct of church services in this denomination was Lithuanian. The number of ministers identified with the church was three. (Note: For LNCC 1916 statistics compiled by United States Census Bureau see "Organizations, members, places of worship, and value of church property, by states: 1916" table.)

The PNCC was organized by Bishop Franciszek Hodur with an episcopal see in Scranton, Pennsylvania. This church was reported for the first time in 1906. In 1916, it claimed 34 organizations; 28,245 members with 37 church edifices. There were 21 organizations reporting a parsonage. Of the 34 organizations, two, with 586 members, reported the use of English only in church services, and 32, with 27,659 members, the use of Polish only. The number of ministers identified with the church was 45. (Note: For PNCC 1916 statistics compiled by United States Census Bureau see "Organizations, members, places of worship, and value of church property, by states: 1916" table; for a comparative summary of 1906 and 1916 see unnamed table.) A movement similar to that started by Hodur and his associates was the one started by Bishop Antoni Kozlowski in Chicago. One or two churches in Chicago, together with churches in Indiana and Wisconsin, and several in the East, organized another independent diocese, known as the Polish Independent Catholic Church, of which Kozlowski was eventually made bishop. Subsequently, these two organizations united to form the PNCC, which by 1916 included all the Polish Independent Catholic Church parishes in the United States, except one in Buffalo.

By 1929, about four years after Vilatte's death, only one denomination derived from Vilatte was included in Religious Bodies, 1926 edition. The report explained that, by then, "none of these American bodies or leaders are connected with or recognized by the Old Catholic Churches of any part of continental Europe, nor are their Orders or Apostolic Successions derived directly, if at all, from European Old Catholic Churches" and added a "caution against misinterpretation" of the term "Old Catholic Churches". It identified three subsets of denominations in the Old Catholic Churches group in the US:

1. ACC and "its numerous derivatives"
2. Old Catholic Church in America
3. North American Old Roman Catholic Church and the "numerous separated personal leaders derived from its establishment"

According to the report, these entities are no longer either connected with Old Catholic Churches of continental Europe, which "repudiated all responsibility for or connection with" bishops who derived their consecrations from the consecration of Mathew, or with the Syriac Orthodox Church of Antioch. "Of the many bishops that have been consecrated in this group, [...] most have assumed other names and titles and founded separate churches for themselves by civil incorporation. For most of these no statistics are published, for the reason that the Census Bureau collects its statistics directly from congregations rather than from the officers of corporations." So, "direct comparisons between the bodies as reported at the two censuses are impossible, [...] because of numerous organic changes," according to the United States Census Bureau. Which also stated "a reorganization since the census of 1916 makes it impossible to identify the whole group with any of the bodies formerly presented," in the 1916 data, under the name "Old Catholic Churches"; the reorganized ACC claimed 11 organizations, with a membership of 1,367 with two church edifices. There was one organization reporting a parsonage. The number of ministers identified with the church was not reported.

Religious Bodies, 1926 edition, named one denomination "which now has a thriving organization of congregations" derived from Vilatte, that "aspires to ultimate association with Eastern Orthodox Churches as a racial or national unit" and "does not desire any association with Old Catholic Churches"—the African Orthodox Church (AOC). It had its episcopal see in New York City but incorporated in Florida. This denomination was reported for the first time in 1926. It claimed 13 organizations, with a membership of 1,508 without a church edifice. There was no organization reporting a parsonage. The number of ministers identified with the church was 30.

Another denomination, named the African Orthodox Church of New York (AOCoNY) also had its episcopal see in New York City and incorporated in New York. The AOCoNY was in a fellowship "strictly one of spiritual communion" with the AOC and a distinct organization with "absolute independence." This denomination was also reported for the first time in 1926. It claimed three organizations, with a membership of 717 with one church edifice. There was one organization reporting a parsonage. The number of ministers identified with the church was not reported.

A notice from the Syrian Patriarchate of Antioch and All the East concerning schismatic bodies and episcopi vagantes, dated December 10, 1938, states that "after direct expulsion from official Christian communities" some schismatic bodies exist, including "all the sects claiming succession through Vilatte," that claim "without truth to derive their origin and apostolic succession from some ancient Apostolic Church of the East" and

[...] some of these schismatic bodies have with effrontery published statements which are untrue as to an alleged relation "in succession and ordination" to our Holy Apostolic Church and her forefathers, We find it necessary to announce to all whom it may concern that we deny any and every relation whatsoever with these schismatic bodies and repudiate them and their claims absolutely. Furthermore, our Church forbids any and every relationship, and above all, intercommunion with all and any of these schismatic sects and warns the public that their statements and pretensions [...] are altogether without truth.

The notice named both the ACC and the AOC specifically as examples of such schismatic bodies.

According to James R. Lewis, in The Encyclopedia of Cults, Sects, and New Religions, the ACC "was taken over by bishops with theosophical leanings" after Vilatte's death.

=== Intercollegiate University ===
Lloyd and John Churchill Sibley together operated a parallel business entity, called the Intercollegiate University (IU), in which Lloyd was president and Sibley was chancellor.

According to the 1924 Year Book of the Churches, "in order to establish a legal bond with the American Catholic Church", the College of Church Musicians (CoCM) was reorganized and incorporated as IU in Illinois. Previously, Year Book of the Churches listed a "Theological Department" associated with the ORCC once, only in the 1919 edition, and no school was associated with the ACC that year. The next year, the 1920 edition listed an "American Catholic Seminary" associated with the ACC and no school associated with the ORCC. IU was "the university and seminary of the American Catholic Communion".

CoCM was incorporated in Kansas in 1892.

According to The Spectator, after Sibley died, "the Intercollegian accomplished a remarkable feat by publishing an obituary notice of him without mentioning his name." The Intercollegian was an IU periodical.

== Council of Oversight ==
In Chicago, Joseph Rene Vilatte was established on Fullerton Ave. There with the leaders of the Polish and the Italian constituencies, he made the American Catholic Church evolve into a Council of Oversight. The concept of such a council appeared in his booklet Apostolic Reunion in America, published in 1909. The following protocol was signed:

We, Joseph Rene Archbishop Vilatte, Stephen Bishop Kaminski, and Paul Bishop Miraglia, by the grace of God and the suffrage of the faithful, assembled in the Cathedral of Buffalo, on this the feast of the Circumcision of Christ in the year 1910, do hereby declare that we are

- a council of churches open to all persons having their residence in this country, whatever may be their nationality;
- united in the fidelity to the true faith in our Lord Jesus Christ, who is the sole Head of the Universal Church and our High Priest;
- imbued with the American Spirit of democracy and liberty;
- a branch or section of the true (Christian) Catholic Church of God, with its own Synod and Conference of Bishops

== Hungarian American Constituency ==
Another bishop was added to the Council of Oversight on April 27, 1913, when Vilatte consecrated Victor von Kubinyi in South Bend, Indiana.

Kubinyi immigrated to the USA c. 1906. He functioned as a priest in Newark, New Jersey.

Dissidents in a schism from St. Stephen Church for Hungarians in South Bend, a parish of the Roman Catholic Diocese of Fort Wayne, arranged for Kubinyi to come from Newark to South Bend and elected him pastor of their separatist congregation, Sacred Heart Independent Hungarian Catholic Church.

Tensions flared in June at a cemetery during a funeral officiated by Kubinyi, the South Bend Tribune printed that, "it is said, an attempt was made to prevent the [...] burial because the mother attends the new independent church" but she owned the lot and "interment took place despite the protests of cemetery attaches who refuse to lend their aid to the ceremonies." Kubinyi then dedicated a 20 acres (8.1 ha) parish cemetery in July. In August, the congregation joined the Polish National Catholic Church (PNCC); according to the South Bend Tribune, Kubinyi said the congregation was only independent financially and was dependent on Bishop Franciszek Hodur's "direction in all matters of religion, morals and discipline." In September, Hodur dedicated the church. The parish was financially sound and without debt. In December, when factional differences were being resolved, (Note: "Members of the Sacred Heart church, with the exception of the leaders [...] will be received back into the church, according to the announcement of [...] Varlaky, pastor of the St. Stephen's. Officers of the congregation and men who were instrumental in bringing [...] Kubinyi will be compelled to settle their differences with" Alerding. "Kubinyi will be received into the fold again only after serving a term of penance," according to Varlaky.) Kubinyi deserted the parish and left South Bend. He said:

I could not help coming to the conclusion the best service I could render [...] this community [...] was to leave here. I was told my work was disturbing business. [...] I am leaving town as the victim of a mistake; a mistake of those who meant well, but who not much of their own fault, were not quite up to the level of the task.

In February, 1913, Hodur assigned a Polish priest who fluently spoke Hungarian, Father Basil Sychta, as Kubinyi's replacement. Kubinyi returned from Chicago to South Bend in April and announced that Vilatte will consecrate him as a bishop for a proposed new sect for Hungarians. Kubinyi said in his announcement:

I am not coming back to South Bend to organize a new or a dissenting parish. I am coming here to found a new church for which South Bend will be the national headquarters. Additional churches will be established in all parts of the country.

The South Bend Tribune reported that it was "not improbable that the independent congregation of the Sacred Heart" would transfer to Kubinyi's jurisdiction. On April 16, Hungarian National Church in America (HNCiA) was incorporated by Kubinyi in Indiana. Kubinyi alleged, in an affidavit, that the 1913 election of officers in the PNCC parish was false and fraudulent. He stated that according to records Sychta was the priest but according to the church constitution Kubinyi was the perpetual priest. He stated that he resigned "but that his resignation, tendered in duress was never accepted." He also listed a different group of officers in his affidavit than those listed in County records. When Vilatte arrived in South Bend for the consecration, no place for the holding of the ceremonies had been selected. Although police were present because "Kubinyi feared that trouble might ensue at the services from members of the old church and therefore requested police protection," they were not needed at his consecration. The Fort Wayne Weekly Sentinel reported that Vilatte consecrated Kubinyi as bishop and founder of the HNCiA. It noted that no arrangements were made for a location where Kubinyi's faction of adherents would hold services. After his consecration, Kubinyi filed three lawsuits in May for damages against the chairman of the church, Syctha and the officers of the church. He lost the case. He also filed a lawsuit for malicious prosecution against the chairman of the church in city court which stated the chairman had charged Kubinyi with stealing church records, which Kubinyi had sent to Varlaky and later recovered, and although the chairman's charge was withdrawn. A few weeks later, he declared that if a conciliation with the PNCC parish was reached then he would not attempt to organize a new HNCiA congregation.

Kubinyi and his adherents were accepted into the PECUSA. In December, 1913, Kubinyi renounced his Roman Catholic faith as well as his title as bishop and was ordained as a PECUSA rector, a cleric in charge of a parish, by Bishop John Hazen White, of Michigan City. Soon thereafter he founded Holy Trinity First Hungarian Episcopal Church in South Bend. On November 15, 1918, he was deposed by White.

Kubinyi resumed overseeing the Hungarian constituency on November 15, 1918, this time from New York City. He was installed as Ordinary of Eastern Atlantic States six years later, on October 16, in the Armenian Cathedral, NYC. In November 1924, he was also installed as a member of the cathedral chapter of the African Orthodox Church, invited by McGuire. He retired from the ministry in 1925 and went to live in Washington, DC dedicating the rest of his life to arts and literature. His involvement in the church after 1925 was through Vilatte's Order of the Crown of Thorns into which he was invested as prelate commander by Vilatte in 1913.

Although a Central Press Association supplied article described him as "a scholar and a linguist", in 1927, Kubinyi was an amateur painter who lived meagerly in "his tiny studio in New York City" and worked as a secretary. He began painting while employed as a farmworker. According to the Central Press Association, Kubinyi's artwork hung in William Henry Holmes' "exhibition rooms for five weeks." By the 1930s he was known as the "Hungarian Bluebeard" in New York, an "ex-priest, ex-bishop, now fugitive from justice, under criminal indictment for forgery and embezzlement" found on wanted posters. Kubinyi was arrested for extradition to New York from California in 1938 where he was working as a teacher of Latin and Psychology in Lake Elsinore, California, using the alias "Dr. Felix Renatus".
