= Frederick Lloyd =

Frederick Lloyd may refer to:

- Frederick Lloyd (actor) (1880–1949), British actor
- Frederick Lloyd (director) (born 1991), British film director
- Frederic Lloyd (1918–1995), English theatre manager
- Frederick Ebenezer Lloyd, Catholic bishop with the American Catholic Church
