= Bergues-Saint-Winoc =

Bergues-Saint-Winoc may refer to:

- The Abbey of Berghes-Saint-Winoc, named in honour of Saint-Winoc.
- The city of Bergues.
- The Noble family of de Berghes-Saint-Winoc.
