= Paolo Miraglia-Gulotti =

Deceased Italian excommunicated Independent Catholic priest

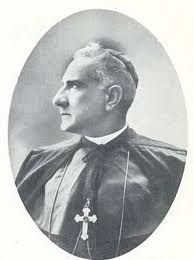
- Predecessor: Joseph René Vilatte
- Successor: Frederick Ebenezer Lloyd

Orders
- Ordination: 1879 by Giovanni Battista Scalabrini

Personal details
- Born: March 22, 1857 Ucria, Sicily, Kingdom of the Two Sicilies
- Died: 25 July 1918 (aged 61) Chicago, Illinois
- Denomination: Christian (Old) Catholic Church, American Catholic Church

Ordination history
History
Episcopal consecration
- Consecrated by: Joseph René Vilatte (epis. vag.)
Episcopal succession
Bishops consecrated by Paolo Miraglia-Gulotti as principal consecrator
- Ernest Houssay, Église Gallicane: December 4, 1904
- William P. Whitebrook, Bishop of the UK: December 27, 1908
- Carmel Henry Carfora, National Catholic Diocese of North America: June 14, 1912, claims of consecration disputed
- Joseph Zielonko, Polish Catholic Apostolic Church in New Jersey: November 16, 1913
- Paul Markiewicz, Polish Catholic Apostolic Church in Canada: November 16, 19136

Paolo Vescovo Miraglia-Gulotti (March 22, 1857 – July 25, 1918) was an excommunicated bishop for Independent Catholic churches in the Kingdom of Italy and the United States and was the leader of the Italian National Catholic Church.

Miraglia-Gulotti is considered an episcopus vagans. (Note: According to Henry R. T. Brandreth, in Episcopi Vagantes and the Anglican Church, a modern episcopus vagans is one "who has, or claims to have, received irregular or clandestine consecration; or, having been consecrated regularly and canonically, has been excommunicated by, or otherwise cut off from, the Church which consecrated him, and is not in communion with any historic metropolitical See. The main ground of objection against him is that, in spite of resounding claims to the contrary, his episcopal status is doubtful, and that, even if his orders are valid, the exercise of them is not legitimate. In many cases the church over which he claims to preside appears to exist, if it exists at all except on paper, for the sake of the bishop rather than the bishop for the sake of the Church.")

== Biography ==
Miraglia-Gulotti was born to a Roman Catholic family in Ucria, Sicily, in the Kingdom of the Two Sicilies.

Miraglia-Gulotti was a professor at the seminary of Patti at 19, was ordained a priest at 22, then a student at the University of Palermo.

Miraglia-Gulotti was censured in Sicily for his preaching. Miraglia-Gulotti, a priest from Ucria, Sicily, had been called to Rome early in 1895 by his friend, Isidoro Carini, Prefect of the Vatican Library, to assist him in a new periodical, the Rivista delle scienze ecclesiastiche, Carini was an advocate of reconciliation between the Holy See and the Kingdom of Italy. (Note: Carini was a "great friend" of Francesco Crispi, a main protagonist of Italian unification. He served as the agent of negotiations between the Holy See and the Italian Government but "it is not known on what lines they were conducted". France irritated against the Kingdom of Italy because of the Triple Alliance, and feared that any rapprochement between the Holy See and the Quirinal Palace would serve to increase her rival's prestige, interfered and forced Pope Leo XIII to break off those negotiations by threatening to renew hostilities against the Church in France.) Carini died suddenly, on June 25, 1895, rumored by poison, and the periodical was abandoned.

In the spring of the same year, 1895, Miraglia-Gulotti was sent to Piacenza, in Northern Italy, to preach the May sermons in honor of Mary; there he was embroiled in a series of either scandals or conspiracies. "It would be interesting to relate [...] the dramatic details of the conspiracies. But I leave them to the curious students of press and police reports. They are remarkably unpleasant reading. For my present purpose it is sufficient to speak of Miraglia now as a free man," wrote Paulina Irby, in National Review and noted that she omitted, among other events, "his terrible denunciations of the Jesuits" and the opening of his Oratorio di San Paolo, Chiesa Italiana Internationale, (Note: Although Irby used the names "Oratorio di San Paolo" and "Chiesa Italiana Internationale", Miraglia used "Oratorio S. Paolo di Piacenza" and "Chiesa italo-internazionale" (Italo-international Church) to identify his congregation's church and his sect in 1901; and, he used "Chiesa Cattolico-Indipendente d'Italia e fra gl'Italiani all'Estero" (Catholic-Independent Church of Italy and among the Italians abroad) to identify his sect in 1910.) which began in a former stable of an old palazzo with church furnishing principally provided by Mazzini's niece, "and with much else that is expressive of loyal and national feeling, and which is not to be seen in any other place of worship with which I am acquainted in Italy." His congregation had just that church, and "is spoken of contemptuously as the congregation of Signor Abbate's stable", she wrote, as the Abbate family own the palazzo.

On April 15, 1896, Miraglia, who resided in Piacenza but was a priest of the Roman Catholic Diocese of Patti, Sicily, was excommunicated for, what was called, his "incredible, audacious, and obstinant scandals which long troubled the Roman Catholic Diocese of Piacenza". That year, Nevin introduced in The Churchman the "modern Savonarola", Nevin wrote "he has placed himself under wise guidance, and will not be apt to do anything rashly or ignorantly" but failed to include any specifics. The following week, The Churchman only hinted at the secular side of that movement by publishing a story from Milan's Corriere della Sera which wrote: "The struggle is now not only religious, but civic. The partisans of the bishop will hear of no truce with the partisans of Miraglia, and whenever they can, remove them from the employments that they hold." Within a year, on August 31, 1897, he attended the Union of Utrecht's 4th International Old Catholic Congress in Vienna.

According to The Guardian, Miraglia's "adherents declared themselves to be the Chiesa Autonoma Italo-Internazionale" on October 21, 1897, after Miraglia returned from the International Old Catholic Congress in Vienna. He founded a weekly newspaper, titled Girolamo Savonarola, which he used as his organ.

By 1900, two reformation groups in Italy elected bishops for their churches: one group in Arrone elected Campello as its bishop and the other group in Piacenza elected Miraglia as its bishop. Campello made at least four visits to England where he was received at gatherings in Lambeth Palace, by the Archbishop of Canterbury, and in Fulham Palace, by the Bishop of London. He was licensed in 1883 by Bishop Abram Newkirk Littlejohn, of the Episcopal Diocese of Long Island, to work as a priest "wherever there may be lawful opportunity" for Campello's reformation efforts in Italy, and by that time, Nevin already knew Campello for many years. Campello was elected bishop by a synod of his church in 1893 and asked Herzog for consecration, who in turn brought Campello's case to the International Old Catholic Bishops' Conference (IBC). The IBC refused to consecrate Campello in 1901, according to Oeyen, "because of his limited number of baptisms and marriages and his close relationships with Anglicans, Methodists, and Waldenses". The Church of Utrecht thought Campello was too Protestant. Miraglia, by then a leader of reform in northern Italy, wrote to Joseph René Vilatte regarding the movement and consecration. On May 6, 1900, while the Holy See examined Vilatte's case, Vilatte consecrated Miraglia in Piacenza;

Brandeth wrote that Vilatte "started what he [Vilatte] called an 'Italian National Episcopal Church' at Milan, and for this purpose consecrated [...] Miraglia Gulotti as 'Bishop of Piacenza'," a church modeled in an Anglican fashion and moderately anti-Roman. Miraglia was a popular speaker known for his relations with Ferdinando Bracciforti, who represented Milanese liberal Protestantism. According to Peter-Ben Smit, in Old Catholic and Philippine Independent Ecclesiologies in History, "the orders of episcopi vagantes in general, and specifically those of [...] Miraglia, and of all those consecrated by them, are not recognized, and all connections with these persons are formally denied" by the IBC. On June 13, 1900, the Congregation of Universal Inquisition declared that major excommunication was incurred by both Miraglia and Vilatte. The next day, June 14, 1900, the Alexandria Gazette reported that his anti-Catholicism offended the sensibilities of an American Methodist Episcopal Church in Rome that the "majority of the Protestant congregation interrupted" his discourse "with angry protests against his abuse of the pulpit and the police were finally called to prevent an open riot." In 1901, Tony André Florence, in a report about the liberal movement in Italy presented to the International Council of Unitarian and Other Liberal Religious Thinkers and Workers in London, wrote that Miraglia's "desire to be at the head of a personal movement, after separating him from the Old Catholics whose ideas were akin to his, threw him suddenly into a false path." His consecration by Vilatte "lost him the sympathy of many, and his profession of faith completed their disappointment." Florence wrote that Miraglia's "reformatory movement, therefore, is now in suspense," after he was obliged to refuge abroad.

While the ACS reported, in The Times, that although the "discreditable incident" of Miraglia "having arrogated to himself the dignity" of bishop-elect and his consecration happened, the work of the "real bishop-elect", Campello, was going on independently, with headquarters at Rome. It is unclear if the two juxtaposed groups were concurrent factions of one movement.

After the Italian Court of Cassation had upheld a sentence of three years in prison for various earlier judgments, Miraglia fled to Switzerland and then London. He was lecturing in England c. 1901. His church in Piacenza was disbanded in 1901. In 1904, the IBC refused to recognize Miraglia's consecration as valid when he presented himself to the sixth International Old Catholic Congress in Olten, Switzerland.

Already a convicted fugitive who evaded Italian justice, Miraglia was then involved with religious associations in France. For example, a parish church in Piedigriggio, Corsica, was confiscated by the government from the Roman Catholic Diocese of Ajaccio and devolved to a religious association formed on December 11, 1906. The parish's priest disappeared after he signed a declaration of adherence to the sect. From May, 1907, Jacques Forcioli, a Miraglia ordained priest working for that religious association, conducted schismatic services. In November, a lawsuit was filed by a replacement priest appointed to serve the parish by the Bishop of Ajaccio, against the mayor and Forcioli, demanding the restitution of the church. The court rendered a judgment which condemned the mayor, declared that religious association illegal, and ordered the restoration of the property to the RCC's priest.

Miraglia intended to ordain a priest for Christmas there; but he fled and evaded a French deportation order against him on Christmas Eve. A few days later Forcioli was arrested for stealing items from the church; the mayor and members of the sect were arrested for complicity. Fearing assassination, the mayor refused to implement the restitution on February 25, 1908. Finally, the Court of Appeal in Bastia dismissed Forcioli and restored exclusive possession of the Piedigriggio church property back to the RCC's priest. On March 14, 1908, La Croix emphasized that the scope of the Bastia decision was of special importance, not only because it was the first judgment on the subject, but also because of the principles of law it invoked.

Vilatte and Miraglia united in a joint effort, and except for the brief interval, c. 1906 – c. 1907, when Vilatte unsuccessfully attempted to organize a religious association in France, their work had chiefly been in the Midwestern United States.

According to Thomas E. Watson, in Watson's Jeffersonian Magazine, after being "arrested like a common criminal" Miraglia was deported from the United States, on August 4, 1910, "as though he were [...] an enemy to society." Two days before his deportation, the New York Times reported that Miraglia, "self-appointed head" of the Catholic Independent Church of Rome, was detained on Ellis Island "on the charge that he is an undesirable citizen" after being apprehended in Springfield, Massachusetts. He admitted that "while in Piacenza and Parma he served several terms and was heavily fined for libel, and while a professor at the Patti University he forged the signatures of [f]aculty to fake diplomas, which he sold to deficient students."

In 1915, Miraglia assisted Vilatte in Frederick Ebenezer Lloyd's consecration.

On February 15, 1915, The Evening World reported that he was "charged with obtaining alms under false pretenses," after the Bureau of Charities went to his mission and "found only an empty shack," and arrested along with two of his alleged accomplices by detectives. While in court, a Deputy United States Marshal arrested him "on the charge of writing vicious letters" to a woman.

On July 25, 1918, Miraglia died at Oak Forest Hospital of Cook County of myocarditis.
