= Church of the Holy Transfiguration of Christ-on-the-Mount =

Historic church in New York, United States

Coordinates: 42.056622°N 74.132738°W

- U.S. National Register of Historic Places
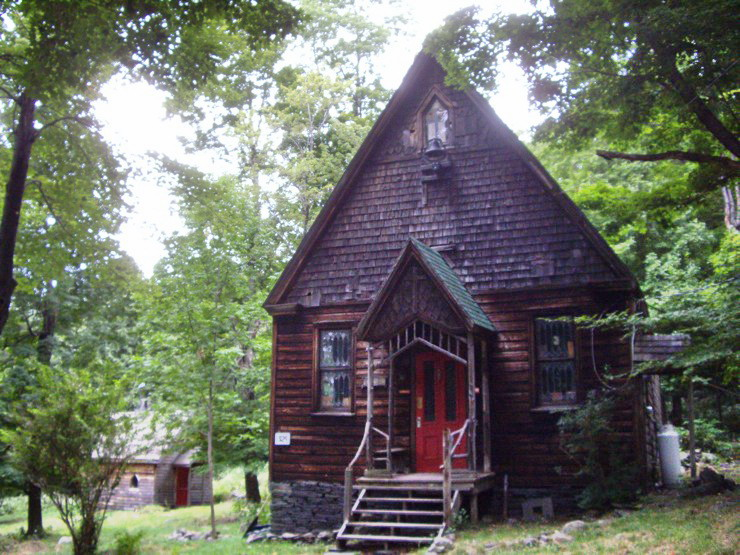
- Location: 325 Mead Mountain Road, Woodstock, New York
- Built: 1891
- Architectural style: Gothic Revival
- NRHP reference No.: 05001385
- Added to NRHP: December 9, 2005

The Church of the Holy Transfiguration of Christ on the Mount is a modest, single-room, hand-built wooden Western Orthodox church near the summit of Meads Mountain in Woodstock, New York, originally constructed c. 1891 by George Mead, his son, William Mead and his son's wife, Anna Della Mead. The church is a parish of the Old Calendarist Autonomous Orthodox Metropolia of North and South America and the British Isles. Services in the Sarum Rite tradition are held each Sunday morning.

The church is purported to be the repository of a Marian weeping icon. In the 1960s, Father Francis, the much-beloved "hippie priest", here welcomed hippies who had congregated in town during those years that culminated in the famous art and music festival. Fr. Francis was a bishop of Old Catholicism, which acknowledges the Pope as an earthly spiritual leader but, unlike classical Roman Catholicism, does not consider the Pope to be supreme or infallible, before becoming Western Orthodox under the Russian Exarchate of North America and later the Ukrainian Autocephalous Orthodox Church in Exile.

The church has been placed on the National Register of Historic Places, due in meaningful part to the devoted efforts of Deacon John Nelson, an understudy of Fr. Francis and peer of contemporary spiritual leaders who reverently maintained the church until his death on August 1, 2017. Fr. John's remains were committed to the earth alongside the structure following a traditional requiem Mass.
