= William H. F. Brothers =

William Brothers OSB
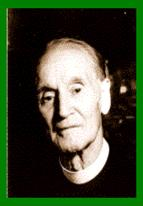
- Bishop William H. F. Brothers
- Installed: October 3, 1916
- Predecessor: Rudolph de Landas Berghes, Jan F. Tichy
- Successor: Dom John (LoBue)

Orders
- Ordination: March 17, 1911 by Jan F. Tichy
- Consecration: October 3, 1916 by Rudolph de Landas Berghes

Personal details
- Born: April 7, 1886 Nottingham, UK
- Died: July 21, 1979 (aged 93) Woodstock, New York
- Denomination: Old Catholic Church in America

Ordination history of William H. F. Brothers
History
Episcopal consecration
- Consecrated by: Rudolph de Landas Berghes (Primate)
Episcopal succession
Bishops consecrated by William H. F. Brothers as principal consecrator
- Albert Edward Selcer: March 9, 1924
- Charles Marzena: October 12, 1924
- William Montgomery Brown: June 24, 1925
- Wallace David De Ortega Maxey: January 2, 1927
- Paul William Adolph Schultz: June 29, 1927
- Albert Dunstan Bell: August 25, 1935
- Albert A. Steer: July 13, 1947
- Gerard George Shelley: December 8, 1949
- Joseph Anthony MacCormack: 1965

William Henry Francis (April 7, 1886 – July 21, 1979), also William Henry Francis Brothers with his matronymic surname added, was an Independent Old Catholic Benedictine, advocate for the immigrant, worker and the poor.

== Life ==
Brothers a native of England but lived in Waukegan, Illinois was a resident of an independent Benedictine monastery located in Waukegan and run by Father Bernard Harding, OSB, a former monk of St. Gregory's Abbey in Sacred Heart, Oklahoma. Brothers was influenced by Harding. (Note: Harding was associated Vilatte. Harding, signed a letter to The Church Eclectic as "Bro. Augustine de Angelis. Orthodox Old Catholic Church. Duvall, Kewaunee Co., Wis." in 1893. Harding was also associated with Edward Rufane Donkin, c. 1903, in Cleveland, Ohio, were both Donkin and Harding were indicted for attacking two boys.)

== Fond du Lac ==
Protestant Episcopal Church in the United States of America (PECUSA) Bishop Charles Chapman Grafton, of Fond du Lac, a founding member of the Society of St. John the Evangelist, "had strong ideas about the importance of communities of men and their significant contributions to the church" and his "influence on the growth of the religious life", according to Rene Kollar on Project Canterbury, "extended across the Atlantic". On his return travel from Russia in 1903, Grafton visited "his old friend", Charles Wood, 2nd Viscount Halifax, where he met Aelred Carlyle and appraised Carlyle's Benedictine revival group living as guests on Halifax's estate in Painsthorpe. William Maclagan, Archbishop of York, "expressed some reservations about conferring this token or symbol of Anglican approval on Carlyle", but Halifax negotiated Maclagan's permission to install Carlyle as a Benedictine Abbot.

Halifax wanted Grafton to bless and install Carlyle as abbot of the nascent monastic community. So, in 1903, Grafton installed Carlyle and ordained him a subdeacon, which according to Kollar was an order abolished during the English Reformation. Kollar wrote that although Carlyle previously "could not meet the educational and academic requirements" of a priest, Grafton agreed to ordain him "without the usual formalities, provided that the Archbishop of York raised no objections"; Maclagan approved and granted dimissorial letters to Carlyle for Grafton to perform his ordination "but he also made Carlyle promise to keep the ordination and the circumstances surrounding it a secret." While Carlyle visited Grafton in 1904, Grafton ordained him a priest during a secret but officially documented ceremony in Ripon, Wisconsin. Both men wanted to establish a Benedictine brotherhood in Grafton's Diocese of Fond du Lac. Kollar wrote:

Carlyle spoke about his grand dream of establishing a branch house of his Anglican Benedictines in the Diocese of Fond du Lac because of the requests of some interested parties and others desirous of becoming Benedictines. The American novices, however, would spend their probationary or novitiate period at Abbot Carlyle's English monastery. "It is my idea, as head of the order," he told the press, "to keep the English and American branches separate, and so the superior of the Wisconsin house who will be sent over, will be American."

Carlyle stated that several men expressed an interest, but the project would take at least two years to select and train suitable candidates. Anson wrote that Brothers was not among a few American aspirants at Carlyle's monastery. It is unclear what happened next but, according to Kollar, Carlyle's involvement stopped in 1904. "Apparently little or no contact existed between Carlyle's brotherhood and his American counterpart", noted Kollar.

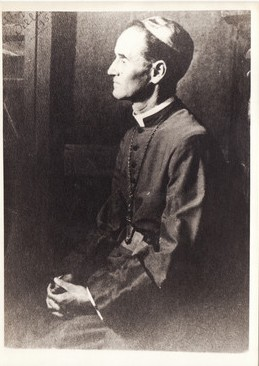
Archbishop Brothers

While walking near the train station in Waukegan, he noticed a group of Benedictine monks waiting for a train and struck up a conversation with them. They explained who they were Anglican Benedictine Monks and that they were on their way to Fond du Lac, Wisconsin, for Carlyle's ordination. They invited Brothers to join them for the trip and ordination. This he did. Brothers met Grafton, they became immediate friends and soon it was decided that Brothers would return to Waukegan for his belongings and that he would return to Fond du Lac where he and Grafton would start a Benedictine monastery next door to St. Paul's Episcopal Cathedral.

In 1908, Father Herbert Parrish, a PECUSA priest in good standing, was prior of the Anglican Benedictine monastery of St. John the Baptist in Fond du Lac. (Note: The 1908 issue of Living Church Annual lists what appears to be one order, contained in the list of recognized religious orders, of two groups with two different priors and no abbot: one in Fond du Lac, and another in Greens Farms, Connecticut. The 1909 issue lists what appears to be one order, contained in the list of recognized religious orders, of one monastery with one prior and Grafton as abbot. Anson mistakenly wrote that Living Church Annual did not reference the Fond du Lac monastery after 1909. The 1910 issue lists what appears to be one order, but no longer contained in the list of recognized religious orders, of one monastery with one prior and Grafton as abbot. The 1911 issue lists neither an order nor a monastery. The 1912 issue does not list the order but does list a monastery with one prior and Grafton as abbot; the 1913 issue, published after Grafton's death, was the same as 1912 but without an abbot. From 1914 onward, neither a Benedictine monastery nor a Benedictine order were listed.)

The first residents were: Parrish, Cyril Haffner, and Brothers.

It was legally incorporated in Fond du Lac in 1909 by Grafton as The American Congregation of the Order of Saint Benedict.

According to Anson, Vilatte ordained Brothers c. 1910 – c. 1911 and later deposed him.

It is unclear if he is the same person as the William A. Brothers who was ordained in 1911 to the diaconate by "an Armenian Bishop" in Worcester, Massachusetts, and received by Grafton into the Diocese of Fond du Lac in 1912. That William A. Brothers was added to the diocesan roster of clergy in 1912 by Grafton; within a year, he was removed from the diocesan roster of clergy on Reginald Heber Weller's instruction.

Anson wrote, in The American Benedictine Review, that after Parrish left, it "appears that his followers were replaced or displaced by a group of young men who had been formed into a Benedictine brotherhood" by Brothers in Waukegan, Illinois, located outside Grafton's Diocese of Fond du Lac and in the Episcopal Diocese of Chicago where Charles P. Anderson was bishop. Brothers was leader of this group. A monastery named "St. Dunstan's Abbey" was not listed in the Living Church Annual; only a "rented-house was named St. Dunstan's Abbey" with Grafton self-appointed as "their absentee Abbot".

Anson was not certain whether this group was an Anglican religious order, "for by 1911 they were styling themselves 'Old Catholics'".

St. Andrew's Cross printed a letter in 1912, which informed that Grafton "dedicated the Benedictine Abbey in Fond du Lac, under the title of St. Dunstan's Abbey, after the former Archbishop of Canterbury". According to that letter, the monastic community, whose members did missionary work among the foreign population, was "thoroughly loyal" to the PECUSA. Later in 1912, Grafton reported that the "little abbey or monastery which has been founded here in Fond du Lac has been put in good order, and a beautiful chapel [...] has been erected". Grafton also published A Commentary on the Rule of the Benedictine Abbey of St. Dunstan in 1912 and, weeks before his death, wrote to Carlyle: "Our little Monastery of St. Dunstan is the baby monastery of Christendom. We have been blessed financially. I have been able to give the Monastery, well fitted up and with beautiful Chapel, to the Order, which I have had incorporated. Grafton died August 30, 1912. Kollar called St. Dunstan's Abbey Grafton's "experiment in conventual life" that "did not survive long after his death in 1912". From 1914 the group was not listed in the Living Church Annual.

== Waukegan ==
After Grafton died in 1912, his successor, Weller, and the Diocese of Fond du Lac did not want to support the monastery and thought the building used as a monastery could be put to better use, so the monks were asked to leave. The monks moved into a large home in Waukegan owned by Brothers' family. They continued to call their monastery "Saint Dunstan Abbey".

Brothers' group, of about five members, was brought into the remaining part of the POCC, then under the jurisdiction Bishop Jan Tichy on October 3, 1911. (Note: It is unclear if Tichy was consecrated a bishop; there is no consensus about who consecrated him. Anson wrote that "brief references to Bishop Tichy" are contained in Anglican and Foreign Church Society (1907) [1904–1905]. Report and Accounts. London: Society for Promoting Christian Knowledge. OCLC 54506697. But, in 1904, the IBC refused Kozlowski's request to consecrate Tichy after Kozlowski presented him as his vicar general at the sixth International Old Catholic Congress in Olten, Switzerland. Congruously, Anson and Brandreth also quote OKKN Bishop Casparus Johannes Rinkel, of Haarlem, who wrote that Tichy was never appointed or acknowledged as bishop. Ronald Sadlowski's opinion, in Polish American Studies, was that Kozlowski "seems to have consecrated" Tichy between 1904 and 1907. Anson thought "it may have been Kozlowski." Theodore Andrews, in The Polish National Catholic Church in America and Poland, stated that Kozlowski did not consecrate any bishops in the US.) Tichy was not confirmed as Kozlowski's successor by the IBC.

When Grafton fell ill, he transferred the ecclesiastical authority of the monastery to his friend Tichy. He remained in charge of the monastery until 1914, when Tichy's diocese elected Brothers as bishop, whose ill health forced him to give up his duties. Since by this time relations between the American movement and the Old Catholic Church in England had been closely knit and the strengthening of the bonds existing between them was desirable the young bishop-elect was to have gone to Europe for his Consecration. But World War I made such an undertaking impossible at the time and it was not until two years later that the opportunity of establishing the European Episcopate in America presented itself. It prospered and was known among Old Catholic and independent ethnic Catholic congregations in Central and northern America. Bishops Joseph Rene Vilatte and Rudolph de Landas Berghes were both guests and Old Catholic priests would often visiting stop by or come for a retreat.

Brothers was consecrated Bishop for the Czech Old Catholic Church on October 3, 1916 in Waukegan by de Landas. The following day, de Landas consecrated Carmel Henry Carfora as a bishop of the North American Old Roman Catholic Church. Shortly after his consecration, Brothers called a meeting of the clergy and the decision was made to change the name of the Church to: The Old Catholic Church in America. This added new responsibility's for the now Archbishop-Abbot. One of his first acts was to unite the various ethnic communities and congregations that were independent of the Roman Catholic and the PECUSA, but maintained their catholic faith and heritage.

Brothers was consecrated by Bishop Rudolph de Landas Berghes in 1916 and later deposed by de Landas, for what "appears to have been" to Brandreth, "on the grounds that at the time of the consecration he had not, in fact, received the Orders of deacon and priest." Brandreth stated that Brothers' "claims of being in communion with Utrecht are quite false." Brothers' consecration was derived from Mathew; therefore not recognised by the IBC. (Note: Smit explained that in 1913, "ties of the IBC with Mathew were formally severed", and after World War I, the IBC "distanced itself more from the 'episcopus vagans' Mathew and those ordained and consecrated by him." Consecrations derived from Mathew were not recognised by the IBC. After Mathew died in 1919, the IBC declared in 1920 that Mathew's "consecration was obtained mala fide and that consequently it is null and void.")

The Kingston Daily Freeman printed, in 1945, that Francis "had worked among underprivileged children in Chicago" prior to his move to New York. While Evers wrote that Francis, "worked among the poor and often exploited industrial workers" in Chicago.

== New York ==
He moved to New York City and operated from St. Dunstan's House. It was, according to the Works Progress Administration's 1939 New York City Guide, "a rest house and city headquarters of Old Catholics, a monastic sect," located next to the PECUSA St. George's Chapel on Stuyvesant Square, in Manhattan.

In 1920, Brothers moved the headquarters of the Old Catholic Church in America and the Old Catholic Benedictines to New York City. There he guided the church and Benedictines through the rough times of the depression and always maintaining his shepherd's stance. He was indeed a spiritual father to all. During the depression he joined with other religious leaders to feed the hungry. His benefactors gave him large sums of money to meet the needs of New York soup kitchens. Known to the people of the vicinity in which he worked and where as a child he came to reside with his family after their arrival from Nottingham, England, he had forsaken the opportunities of the business world to minister to the uncared for, exploited immigrants working in the steel mills. There in the midst of the despised "foreigners" his sympathetic understanding of their problems and his practical attempts to solve them made his mission bountiful in good works.

Any young man, homeless or in need of guidance or retreat, was welcome at the abbey. Haffner, the prior, made all feel welcome and displayed a true Benedictine hospitality.

== Woodstock ==
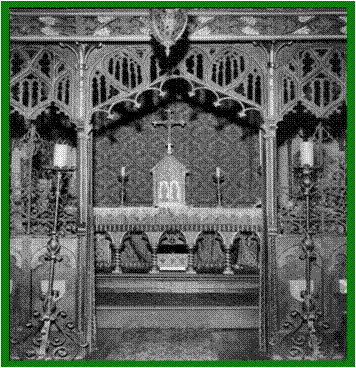
Interior of chapel on Overlook Mountain showing altar behind rood screen

In 1938, Francis moved to Woodstock, New York. The next year, Francis and three members of his seven-member Mariavite group repaired an abandoned PECUSA chapel on Overlook Mountain to use as "nothing more than a monastic chapel". (Note: A halftone photograph in The Kingston Daily Freeman from 1939 shows Francis wearing a Mariavite religious habit consisting of a light tone tunic and a dark tone monastic scapular embroidered with a light tone monstrance.) The chapel was placed on the National Register of Historic Places as the Church of the Holy Transfiguration of Christ-on-the-Mount. They planned beekeeping and raising goats as a farming venture. In 1940, the Kingston Daily Freeman reported that "Francis, of the Community of Felicianow", planned to lease a 20-acre (8.1 ha) property for his proposed nonsectarian summer school for boys, which "will be known as St. Dunstan's School"; he planned to convert it "into a permanent year-around institution" in the future. This proposed venture was not "St. Dunstan's Church".

Around the same time, another property was leased to Francis' congregation. That property included an old barn that was converted into the place of worship known as St. Dunstan's Church. It was destroyed in 1945 by a fire started by a kerosene stove explosion while Francis was preparing for a service; but by the 1950s, the documented account was embellished into a story that the converted barn "was burned during the war whether by vigilantes or act of God no one knows".

The Kingston Daily Freeman reported, in 1945, that Francis lived and maintained his study in the basement of the converted barn while his wife lived in a converted corn crib on the same farm.

Francis, according to the American Church Committee for Armenia, "informed us that his first parish had been an Armenian one, that his father was a close friend of William Gladstone, England's great Armenian friend, and that 'I am proud to be able to tell you that I speak a little Armenian [...]'."

Ammon Hennacy wrote, in his 1952 Autobiography of a Catholic Anarchist, that Francis invited him to visit Woodstock. "This kindly, thin and agile old man was my match in conversation," wrote Hennacy. "He knew many old time radicals whom I had known." A social activist in the Catholic Worker Movement, Hennacy was a Christian anarchist and anarcho-pacifist; he was also a member of both the Socialist Party of America and Industrial Workers of the World. "As I understood it," Hennacy ascertained Francis' denomination and wrote, "these people were not radical but had meekly followed their leaders just as many others do." He narrated how Francis had a friend drive Francis and himself to Maryfarm, the c. 1947 – c. 1965 Catholic Worker Movement farming commune, near Newburgh, New York, where Francis thought he would meet Dorothy Day, a founder of the Catholic Worker Movement, but she had just left for New York City. "I was not attracted to this small denomination because it did not seem to have any life," Hennacy reflected on Francis' group in Woodstock, but he was attracted to Francis "with his simplicity, kindness, and spirit of love".

For a long time there were no postulants for the Old Catholic Benedictines and there was just Brothers and Brother Cyril. The bishop helped organize the Old Catholic Church in America and from time-to-time engaged in ecumenical services. Brothers was friend with Eleanor Roosevelt and the Hearst family and several other society families who contributed to his church in Woodstock.

Brothers helped feed and house many attendees during the Woodstock Festival.

Brothers died in 1979 while in communion with the Ukrainian National Orthodox Church in Exile, but his labors and works are still a part of the Woodstock community. He was succeeded in his work by the prior of the Community, Dom Augustine Whitfield, OSB of Mount Royal Abbey and Abbot (now Metropolitan) John (LoBue) of Holy Name Abbey.

== Notes ==
| Preceded by Rudolph de Landas Berghes | Archbishop of the Old Catholic Church in America; 1916–1962 | disputed |
| Preceded by Jan F. Tichy OSB | Old Catholic Benedictine Abbot; 1914–1979 | Succeeded by Dom Augustine Whitfield OSB & Abbot John (LoBue) |
