= Immaculate Heart of Mary Church (Cleveland) =

Church in Ohio, United States

- Location within Ohio
- 41.4523°N 81.6426°W
- Location: Cleveland, Ohio
- Country: United States
- Denomination: Roman Catholic Church
- Previous denomination: independent Polish Catholic Church
- Website: www.immaculateheartchurch.org

History
- Former name: independent Polish Catholic Church of the Immaculate Heart of the Blessed Virgin Mary
- Status: Parish church
- Founded: May 3, 1894
- Founder: Anton Francis Kolaszewski
- Dedication: Immaculate Heart of Mary
- Dedicated: 27 July 1916

Architecture
- Functional status: Active
- Architect: Anthony F. Wasielewski
- Architectural type: Church
- Style: Romanesque
- Groundbreaking: 1913
- Completed: 1916

Specifications
- Capacity: 1250

Administration
- Province: Cincinnati
- Diocese: Cleveland

Clergy
- Vicar: Andrew Knapik
- Pastor: Ralph G. Hudak

Immaculate Heart of Mary Church (Polish: Kościół Niepokalanego Serca Najświętszej Maryi Panny), is a Catholic parish church in Cleveland, Ohio and part of the Diocese of Cleveland. It is on Lansing Ave. near East 66th St., in a part of the South Broadway neighborhood previously known as Warszawa, also referred to today as Slavic Village. Both the church and the area are GNIS named features. The church is near the area listed as Warszawa Neighborhood District on the National Register of Historic Places. The church, school, rectory, and convent buildings are listed together as a Cleveland Designated Landmark.

The parish was founded in 1894.

== History ==
=== Founding in Schism ===
The independent schismatic congregation, under the title of Independent Polish Catholic Church of the Immaculate Heart of the Blessed Virgin Mary or Immaculate Heart of the Blessed Virgin Mary, was founded 3 May 1894 — about 47 years after the Diocese of Cleveland was erected by Pope Pius IX.

The founding happened at the beginning of the Progressive Era after the Panic of 1893.

The founder, Rev. Anton Francis Kolaszewski (né Rademacher), also known as Rademacher Kolaszewski and Kolaszewski-Rademacher, was born 5 September 1851 in Elżbietów, Poland and immigrated to the United States at about the age of eight.

Kolaszewski made his collegiate studies in the Franciscan College, in Teutopolis, Illinois; then entered St. Mary's Seminary, Cleveland, where, after completing the prescribed course in philosophy and theology, had been ordained for the Diocese of Cleveland, by Bishop Richard Gilmour on 1 July 1883, and was appointed the first resident pastor of St. Stanislaus' church a few weeks after his ordination. Between 1886 and 1890, frequent charges were made against Kolaszewski. Within two months after Bishop Ignatius Frederick Horstmann came to the diocese, another grave charge was made against Kolaszewski. He was unable to disprove it, and so, on 28 May 1892, offered his resignation. His resignation was accepted by Horstmann, on condition that he leave the diocese, which he did. He moved from Cleveland to Syracuse, New York. There he worked as a priest, known as Father Colley, and founded Sacred Heart Church, the first Polish parish church in the Roman Catholic Diocese of Syracuse. He had also been practicing medicine without a license. The Syracuse Courier reported that he "had built up quite an extensive practice drawn mostly from the female portion of the community" and his practice had been brought to the attention of the Onondaga County Medical Society. He was repeatedly served with notices to desist but kept on with his practice. The matter was then brought to the attention of Bishop Patrick Anthony Ludden, but even his disapproval had no effect on his actions. Finally, the Medical society arranged for his arrest. Early in April 1894 he left suddenly and mysteriously; the Syracuse Courier conjectured that he probable learned of his impending arrest and left Syracuse to avoid prosecution. He visited Cleveland and returned to Syracuse on business in May. Kolaszewski remained in Syracuse until May, 1894, when he returned to Cleveland and organized a congregation of his followers from St. Stanislaus' church.

Horstmann referred the case to the Apostolic Nunciature to the United States; Titular Archbishop Francesco Satolli, the Apostolic Nuncio, sent Horstmann his reply; (Note: The full text of Monsignor Satolli's reply to Horstmann, as quoted by Houck and published in the Catholic Universe on 1894-05-26:)

Church of the Sacred Heart, Trenton, N.J., May 20, 1894.

Rt. Rev. I. F. Horstmann. D.D., Bishop of Cleveland:

Rt. Rev. and Dear Sir — With the deepest regret I have learned what has taken place recently in Cleveland on the part of the priest, Kolaszewski, and a certain number of Poles, who associated themselves with him. Father Kolaszewski's action, and all that he dared say in regard to forming a Polish congregation in Cleveland, deserves the greatest reproach; I reprobate and condemn it most energetically and with my full authority. Moreover, I protest most earnestly against his allegation that I have authorized him, or given him the least encouragement as regards his going to Cleveland. He has not my authority for any religious act which he has performed, or which he will perform in the future. He has not even permission for saying Mass. He is a disgrace to the priestly character, and is leading the poor people who confided in him, because he is a priest, away from the flock of Christ. Therefore, the only thing that remains for him to do is: to leave Cleveland immediately and to betake himself to some place, in order to do penance for his sins, and to atone for the great scandal he has caused to the faithful.

It is my wish and order that all the Poles of Cleveland should be informed and enlightened as to the falsity of Father Kolaszewski's statements, and the sacrilegious character of his actions. They should no longer have any relations with him as a priest; they should be faithful and obedient to their Bishop, the only one who has the right of governing the Catholic Church in Cleveland; no act of worship exercised against his will can be lawful, or in any sense Catholic.

With my best regards, I remain, yours in Christ,

† Francis, Archbishop Satolli, Delegate Apostolic

On 1894-06-20, Kolaszewski was excommunicated by Horstmann. (Note: The full text of Horstmann's sentence of excommunication against Kolaszewski, as quoted by Houck and published in the Catholic Universe on 1894-06-23:)

Sentence Of Excommunication Promgulgated Against The Rev. A. F. Kolaszewski.

Cleveland, O., June 20, 1894.

Considering that on the 11th day of last May we had a peremptory notice served on the Rev. A. F. Kolaszewski, forbidding him under penalty of excommunication, to be incurred ipso facto, to celebrate Mass, or to exercise any priestly functions in the diocese of Cleveland, or to do anything toward establishing an independent congregation; considering that in total disregard of this order he notoriously celebrated Mass in public, in the city of Cleveland, and established an independent congregation, under the title of the "Immaculate Heart of the Blessed Virgin Mary"; considering, moreover, that we sent him two letters inviting him to come and see us personally, that we might appeal to him and induce him to abandon his evil and scandalous course — both of which letters of invitation he disregarded; considering, finally, that we had a peremptory summons served on him to appear before us in court, in our Episcopal residence, on Wednesday, June 20th inst., at 10 o'clock a.m., ad audiendum sententiam declaratoriam excommunicationis, unless he would show cause why such sentence should not be pronounced, and that he failed to appear at the time and place appointed; We [sic] therefore and hereby do declare and pronounce that the said Rev. A. F. Kolaszewski has incurred major excommunication, and we decree that his excommunication he published.

Given under our hand and seal, at our Episcopal residence, date and place as above.

† Ignatius Frederick,

Bishop of Cleveland.

And, the congregation was warned. (Note: The full text of Horstmann's warning to followers of Kolaszewski, as quoted by Houck and published in the Catholic Universe on 1894-06-23:)

To Whom it May Concern:

As the Rev. A. F. Kolaszewski has been publicly excommunicated by us. we hereby publicly and officially warn all the faithful under our jurisdiction, under penalty of grievous sin, not to disobey these our commands, viz.: — They must not become members of the schismatic congregation, established by the said Rev. A. F. Kolaszewski, and incorporated under the title of "The Immaculate Heart of the Blessed Virgin Mary", and those who are members thereof must cease to be such. They must not render aid or support to the said schismatic congregation. As for those who are acting as trustees or officers of said incorporated congregation of the Immaculate Heart of the Blessed Virgin Mary, we declare that unless they immediately resign their trust and positions, they will incur excommunication, ipso facto, and that reserved to ourselves.

All the faithful must know that the said Rev. A. F. Kolaszewski can not validly impart absolution in the sacred tribunal of penance, and is absolutely forbidden to administer the sacraments; also that they are strictly prohibited from applying to him for any sacrament or receiving from him any sacrament. Should they do so they commit mortal sin. They are also forbidden to attend services in the church of said congregation, or to receive any religious ministrations from, or hold any religious communication with, the said Rev. A. F. Kolaszewski

We direct that this notice be publicly read at all the Masses in all the churches of our diocese on the Sunday after its receipt.

† Ignatius Frederick,
Bishop of Cleveland.

"Despite their growing numbers, Poles were not represented in the Catholic hierarchy in the United States for many years. This became an increasing source of tension in the Polish-American community, resulting in the founding of schismatic churches in the Polish community. In 1895 in Chicago, Resurrection Father Antoni Kozlowski, assistant pastor of St. Hedwig Parish, led 1,000 of the parish's 1,300 families in founding the 'Independent Catholic Church in America.' Within three years, the Independent Polish Catholic Church in America claimed 17,000 members. In 1897 in Scranton, Pennsylvania, Father Francis Hodur founded the Polish National Catholic Church. Both had themselves consecrated bishops by the Union of Old Catholic Churches in Holland." Also, doctrines of Americanism were held by and taught by many members of the Catholic clergy and hierarchy in the United States in the 1890s. Catholic leaders in the United States denied they held these views.

On July 28, 1894, The Weekly Messenger, in St. Martinville, Louisiana, reported on an article in the Chicago Inter Ocean that announced their new Polish national committee and invited dissatisfied Poles from all over the United States to join their revolutionary church movement. The article also informed that the denomination would probably be the Armenian Apostolic Church. A priest of that church, Mr. Knowles, was in conference with the Patriarch of Antioch seeking consecration to the episcopate; if Knowles succeeded, he probably would have consecrated Kolaszewski a bishop. That same year, Kolaszewski was associated with the Old Catholic Church missionary Archbishop Joseph René Vilatte; (Note: Malankara Orthodox Syrian Church Bishop Antonio Francisco Xavier Alvares, Bishop Athanasius Paulos of Kottayam and Bishop Gregorius Gewargis of Niranam consecrated Vilatte to the episcopate in 1892 and named him "Mar Timotheos, Metropolitan of North America", probably with the blessings of Syriac Orthodox Church Patriarch Ignatius Peter IV. Although Rome never passed judgment on Vilatte's ordination or consecration as a bishop, Cardinal Rafael Merry del Val's opinion was that he was a genuine bishop. In the late 19th century, independent Polish Catholic Churches existed in Baltimore, New York, Toledo, and elsewhere. Polish Roman Catholic priests in Detroit, Cleveland, Chicago, and other cities placed themselves and their parishes under Vilatte's jurisdiction, and new missions were begun in other places for which Vilatte ordained priests as needed. The steadily increasing growth of this movement gave hope for the organization of a coherent Polish Catholic Church in America. After successive annual conferences of the priests and delegates from their parishes, the proposal to elect a Polish suffragan bishop was approved, and in 1897 Rev. Stephen Kaminski of Buffalo was chosen. Kozlowski a disappointed candidate from Chicago, unwilling to accept the result, called a second convention in Chicago, of his supporters, which elected him as a rival bishop, but Vilatte refused to recognize or consecrate him. Kozlowski left America for Europe and was later consecrated rival bishop by Christian Catholic Church of Switzerland Bishop Eduard Herzog of Bern. Factional strife among the Polish priests soon destroyed all prospect of an organized Polish Catholic Church, and Vilatte, becoming finally convinced that deliberate defiance of the canonical authority of their Roman ordinaries, rather than Catholic reform, was the impelling motive of the movement, advised them either to accept fully and freely the Old Catholic principles, or to return to the Roman Church. The evident unwillingness to accept required doctrinal reforms left Vilatte no alternative but to withdraw his approval of their movement; and in 1898 he consecrated Kaminski as suffragan bishop for those priests and parishes which accepted them. Soon after this, Vilatte left America for Paris to consult with advisers regarding his future course, interrupting his journey to ordain Joseph Leycester Lyne and another monk of Capel-y-ffin, Wales, near Llanthony Priory. Being advised in Paris to visit Rome, after a retreat at the Benedictine Ligugé Abbey, Vilatte personally offered his acceptance of the plea of the pope to Eastern Orthodox Church prelates for union with the Holy See; but, on the condition that his episcopal character was solemnly recognized by the Supreme Sacred Congregation of the Roman and Universal Inquisition. Followed by months of waiting for a decision on his status, and a required retreat in the Cistercian Mount Melleray Abbey, Ireland, later developments compelled him to recall his acceptance on his return to Rome. Episcopalian Bishop Charles Chapman Grafton of the Episcopal Diocese of Fond du Lac called Vilatte a "con-man", a "swindler who kept bad company", and "morally rotten". He was excommunicated by the Syriac Orthodox Church for consecrating, contrary to its canon law, spurious bishops. He was excommunicated, on three different occasions, by the Roman Catholic Church in 1900, 1906 and 1925. In 1926, he returned to the Roman Catholic Church and retracted all his errors publicly in the French Roman Catholic newspaper La Croix.) Rev. Constantine Klukowski, OFM, wrote that an 1894 Green Bay, Wisconsin city directory lists Kolaszewski as vicar-general of Vilatte's American Catholic St. Louis Church. (Note: That church was foreclosed. It was purchased by Bishop Sebastian Gebhard Messmer of the Roman Catholic Diocese of Green Bay on February 11, 1898. The deed was signed "Bishop of Green Bay and Trustee of the Polish Catholic Congregation of Green Bay". (Warranty Deed, Deeds, Vol. 82, pp. 286-87) as cited in Klukowski. Messmer then rededicated the church, on February 22, 1898, a Tuesday, to Our Lady of Częstochowa. (Green Bay Gazette, February 22, 1898; and, Kuryer Polski, February 28. 1898) as cited in Klukowski. The name of the church was changed to St. Mary of the Angels in 1900.)

The original Immaculate Heart of Mary church was dedicated on August 18, 1894, by Vilatte. Later that day, a procession, accompanied by three mounted policemen, walking to consecrate the cemetery, was met by an angry mob. Walking back from the cemetery, the procession was attacked and two people were wounded: one received a scalp wound, the other received a gunshot to his calf; both sides quickly scattered after the gunshot. The dedication of Immaculate Heart of Mary church and convention, to form an independent Polish Catholic Church, took place on the same week St. Stanislaus church hosted the Twenty-First Convention of the Polish Roman Catholic Union of America, ("PRCUA"), the oldest Polish American organization in the United States. The national convention of Polish Catholics began August 22, 1894 in the original church. Vilatte presided over schismatic delegates from Buffalo, New York, Freeland, Pennsylvania, Jersey City, New Jersey, Baltimore, Chicago, Milwaukee, Detroit, Omaha, Nebraska, Pittsburgh, St. Louis, Bremond, Texas, and Winona, Minnesota. Vilatte, opened the convention, urging that the Catholic religion be left intact. Remarks were made on the need to announce a platform. Motions were made to renounce allegiance to the Pope, and to recognize Vilatte as the head of the new church. Kolaszewski opposed the first motion, saying that its passage would result in criticism and injury to the group. The first motion lost; the second motion carried. A resolution was passed establishing the name American Catholic Church for the group. The names of Polish National Church and Polish Independent Church were suggested, but were thought to be too narrow. Kolaszewski was chosen vicar general. Tho basis of a constitution was adopted, providing for the ownership of church property by priests, tho right of parishes to call the priests whom they desired, and a school system equivalent to the public schools. The name, American Catholic Church, was later used by Vilette in 1915 in the incorporation of the American Catholic Church in Illinois.

By the next year, Vilatte withdrew his involvement with the schism. It was reported September 6, 1895, that Vilatte said he will neither preside over nor be present at the September 12, 1895 convention, in Cleveland, and would not sanction the movement in any way. Vilatte reasoned that by their refusal to acknowledge the doctrines of the American Old Catholic Church as right, and by clinging to doctrines of the Roman Catholic Church, they are Roman Catholics in rebellion against their church, and as such he will have nothing to do with them. Vilatte wrote in a letter to the convention:

It is your plain duty to adopt one of two courses:

1. accept principles of our Catholic reform with out any dogmatic or disciplinary exception to its teachings;
2. return humbly and submissively to the church whose doctrines are so dear to you, and acknowledge their authority.

Only on these conditions will you hold respect of good Christians of any denominations.

Vilatte stated that the convention in Cleveland will represent churches with a total membership of over 50,000.

The Third Great Awakening saw enormous growth in Methodist membership; in 1896, Kolaszewski proposed to turn the church with its congregation to the Methodist denomination. A sensational article, reported May 5, 1896-05-05, was printed in newspapers across the United States. The article reported Kolaszewski sat in Methodist Episcopal Church Chaplain C. O. McCabe's private box and followed the proceedings of a Methodist Episcopal Church convention being held in Cleveland. And, McCabe said Kolaszewski and his parishioners believe neither dogmas of Papal infallibility nor transubstantiation and want to join the Methodist Episcopal Church. It further reported that Kolaszewski offered to transfer the church, including all the valuable church property, and entire 3,000 member congregation to the Methodist Episcopal Church.

Although Papal infallibility was defined dogmatically in the First Vatican Council of 1869–1870, just about 15 years before the founding of the parish, and, Article XX of the parish constitution, as quoted by Radeker, rejected this dogma, (Note: "As we who have adopted the above articles do not believe any human being can be infallible, even if he call himself a pope of Rome...".) Kolaszewski refused to say anything concerning the matter, and some versions of the article reported this was not a matter for this conference:

Thus far the matter has not been formally presented to the general conference, and it is probable that it will not be done, as this conference can have no jurisdiction in the case. It is possible a resolution may be adopted recommending that the church accept them. But even this much is not certain. The right to accept them lies in the quarterly conference, and to it would the application be made. It only has the right to admit them and it alone can do so.

It was generally reported to be "an assured fact". McCabe said:

Yes, it is true that the priest does desire to ally himself with the Methodist Church. He not only wishes to come to the Methodist Church, but the 3,000 Poles comprising his congregation as well. They do not believe in the infallibility of the pope and transubstantiation any longer. They are becoming more and more educated all the time, and as people are enlightened they do not believe these fallacies. Many thousand Poles art going to join the Methodist Church.

Kolaszewski responded to questions about McCabe's statement:

Nothing has been done in that matter yet, and there is nothing to be said at this time. I prefer not to discuss it.

At least one newspaper printed an additional article the next day.

A few days later, on May 10, 1896-05-10, Kolaszewski couldn't be found; The Evening Times, of Washington, DC, printed a report, on May 6, 1896-05-16, that a group from Cleveland was searching for him in Baltimore, Maryland. The Evening Times also included information on the parishioners reactions to the May 6, 1896-05-06 newspaper reports. They were so infuriated that Kolaszewski fled for his own safety. Sigimund Stephan, president of the Polish-American Club of Baltimore, said that Jasinski, a prominent member of the Polish Independent Church, denied that the congregation was about to change its faith. He said the congregation was divided; one group, of about one hundred people, approving of Kolaszewski plan, and the rest disapproving. The same story is confusing because it also reports they visited Stephan to locate Kolaszewski through him, who was said to be in Baltimore collecting funds for a church which he proposes to build in Ohio.

In December, 1897, Kolaszewski became seriously ill, and asked to be received back into the Church. As the Holy See reserved his case, Horstmann could do nothing for him, unless Kolaszewski accepted the conditions imposed upon him: to retract; to submit; to do penance; and, to promise to, when he was physically able, travel to the Holy See and seek absolution. He refused this reconciliation.

That same year, Kolaszewski secured, through a Canadian agency, a $25,000 mortgage loan from England which enabled the congregation to continue. Radeker names Bishop John Bilsborrow of Salford as the source of this loan.

On August 30, 1908-08-30, parishioners voted in favor of applying for admittance of the independent parish into the Diocese of Cleveland.

=== Return to Union ===
On September 15, 1908, the parish was admitted into the Diocese of Cleveland.

On October 24, 1908-10-24, the parish was brought into full communion with the Catholic Church. An article, found in The Intermountain Colorado Catholic, the official newspaper of the Diocese of Salt Lake City, archived on the Library of Congress Chronicling America online collection, reported on the event:

The end of the unfortunate schism which for several years has separated the Polish parish of the Immaculate Heart of Mary from the Catholic church was formally ratified last Sunday, when with impressive and touching ceremonies Right Rev. Msgr. Boff, administrator of the diocese, solemnly absolved the congregation from the ban of excommunication and received the keys of the church from John Knicola representing the laymen of the parish.

The ceremonies took place with the first authorized mass ever celebrated in the church. It is estimated that fully 10,000 persons were crowded in and around the ediface when Msgr. Boff entered the church and passed up the middle aisle to the main altar. The congregation, so long without ecclesiastical status, was visibly affected as the head of the diocese entered the long-unvisited church on his errand of mercy and of peace. He was attended by a number of the local clergy.

The sermon of the day was preached by Father Kalamaja O.F.M., pastor of St Stanislaus from which the seceders broke away under its former pastor. At the conclusion of his sermon Kelamaja [sic] introduced as the new pastor Father Methodius Kielar O.F.M., who was formally installed and presented with the books and accounts of the parish by William Swibulski church treasurer.

The solemn and unusual service ended with Benediction of the Blessed Sacrament. The remainder of the day was spent in rejoicing by the parishioners. The whole neighborhood wore a festive air with its gay decorations and groups of happy people. For several years there has been a desire for reconciliation with the church among a large section of the shismatics [sic]. About a month tgo [sic] their leader in schism, Rev. A. F. Kolaszewskl former pastor of the church of St. Stanislas [sic] made his submission to the diocosan administrator and preferred a formal request that his congregation be received back into the church. Sunday's ceremony is the answer to the petition. Father Kolaszewski is now in retirement, awaiting the decision of the ecclesiastical authorities in his case.

Kolaszewski's excommunication was lifted on September 4, 1908, and he died on December 2, 1910, and he is buried in section nine, at Calvary Cemetery.

The parish was managed by a succession of administrators, Rev. M. Keilar, OFM 1908–1909; Rev. A. Migdalski, January to October 1909; Rev. J. Darowski, October 1909 to July 1910; and Rev. B. Walter, 1910–1912.

In February, 1912, the parish received its first permanent pastor since Kolaszewski, when Rev. Marion J. Orzechowski was appointed to that post. Orzechowski was born 1877 in Poland and came to Pittsburgh, Pa. in 1884, where he attended elementary school, then went St. Mary's College, Detroit for secondary education, and then studied theology at St. Charles Borromeos Seminary, Philadelphia, where he was ordained in 1899. After his time as Immaculate Heart, he was appointed pastor of St. John Cantius parish, Cleveland from 1933 to 1939. In 1925 he was elevated to the position of the Monsignor by the Holy See. Died May 3, 1939. He was also member of Polish Roman Catholic Union of America; Polish National Alliance; Chaplain of Polish Legion of American Veterans. Decorations: Cross of Merit, with Virtuti Militari, St. Gregory Order, Bethlehem Star, Haller's Swords.

In 1937, John Cardinal Król, on his first assignment, assisted for about one year.

== Original church and bell ==
Church bells are customarily named in honor of saints and ceremonially blessed. The original wooden church's church bell, named Franciszek, was cast in 1894 in St. Louis. and hung in the belfry of the single bell tower.

The original church was dedicated on August 18, 1894.

The original church, until its demolition in 1924, served as a school and meeting hall.

== Second church ==
The church design is attributed to a well known Polish architect, without formal credentials, from Minnesota, Anthony F. Wasielewski, and originally had a capacity to seat 1250 people. Construction began in 1913 with labor and materials furnished by the parish and supervision by Wasielewski. Wasielewski used blueprints copied from a church he constructed, Holy Family church in Tulsa, Oklahoma.

The present church was dedicated by Bishop John Patrick Farrelly on July 27, 1916-07-27.

Three bells were hung in two cupola crowned bell towers. The east tower housed Zygmunt, the largest of the three bells. The west tower housed Jozef and Franciszek, the bell from the original church. Both new bells, named Zygmunt and Jozef, were cast in 1920 in Troy, New York and Zygmunt is estimated to weigh about a ton.

After high winds damaged the west bell tower's cupola, in September 2010, the structural integrity of the cupolas was evaluated and found to be weakened.

On December 17, 2012, both bell tower cupolas where dismantled; the bell, Zygmunt, from the eastern tower, and both bells, Franciszek and Jozef, from the western tower, were removed. (Note: "This church structure is just beautiful and I fell in love with it; the detail is amazing and it should be preserved," said preservationist Kathleen Frost. The parish historian, Glenn Sobola, said the bells will be kept and hopefully returned to the towers after restoration of the bell towers. Sobola recorded the bells ringing before they were taken down on October 17, 2012.)

A recording of the actual cast metal ring of bells chiming will be played as a substitute sound.

=== Exterior ===
Liturgical direction rarely coincides with cardinal direction. Here, the apse is placed in the southern end of the church.

The church has a twin-towered facade with There are four additional side entrances, that provides entry directly into the nave, each face the front: a single door next to each tower and a single door in the front walls of the transept.

The cornerstone, located in the west corner of the facade, is inscribed with a carved line drawing of a heart below a Latin cross over the carved text KOŚCIÓŁ POLSKI R. K. NIEP. SER. N. M. P. 1914.

=== Interior ===
Liturgical direction rarely coincides with cardinal direction. Here, the apse is placed in the southern end of the church.

The interior has a cruciform floor plan. The front of the church has a sanctuary with a semicircular apse with a hemispherical semi-dome. Architecturally the central nave, also called the central aisle, is divided from the side aisles by arched columns. The church has a narthex. Two sacristies are connected by a passage behind the altar.

The transept and the nave barrel vaults intersect forming a groin vault over the crossing.

The interior was redecorated in 1935.

The interior was redecorated in 1958.

A modern 24 rank pipe organ was installed by the Wicks Organ Company in 1962.

The interior was redecorated in 1984.

==== Stained Glass Windows ====
In a sacred image the subject is important not the object; the object is a tool to contemplate the subject; the subject is a spiritual reality. The Benedictine Abbot Suger of Saint Denis called stained glass windows "sermons that reached the heart through the eyes instead of entering through the ears".

The church contains decorated windows of Munich art glass style stained glass protected with exterior rough flat glass windows. They were created by the Munich Studio of Chicago under the direction of Max Guler. Guler, a master of the style, had studied painting in Munich, Germany. Many of them are signed and were installed from 1914 to 1918. They are not just leadlights, decorative windows made of small sections of glass supported in lead cames, but are authentic stained glass; the painters employed by Munich Studio used dark brown vitreous oxide and silver stain to paint designs on pieces of various types of glass. These types included glasses differing in color and translucency. Guler's windows are heavily painted with dark oxides but the glass retains its luminosity because of his masterful brushwork. Even on cloudy days, the windows shine with vibrant colors. The windows created at the Munich Studio also show great detail, especially in facial expressions.

Two windows, in the sacristies at either side of the main altar, are not generally visible to the public:

1. The window, in the sacristy for clergy, right of the main altar, depicts Jesus as the Mass figure. Jesus and two disciples have nimbi; transverse lines, forming a cross, pass beyond the circumference of the nimbus behind Jesus' head.
2. The window, in the sacristy for altar servers, left of the main altar, depicts Canaanite priest Melchizedek, a type of Christ. His offering of bread and wine prefigures the Eucharist. He is mentioned in the Canon of the Mass. None of the figures have nimbi.

The two windows in the transept are the largest in the church.

1. The windows in the left semi-transept depict Christ preaching at the Sea of Galilee. The semi-circle part of this window depicts from left to right: an IHS Christogram, the Lamb of God,
2. The windows in the right semi-transept depict St. Dominic and Our Lady of the Rosary.

The five windows in the east side aisle, or the left side, from the front to the back are depictions of:

1. Christ calming the storm on the Sea of Galilee.
2. Black Madonna of Częstochowa, in clouds, above Our Holy Patrons. On the left is St. Longinus holding the Holy Lance. A Polish National Alliance coat of arms is displayed at the bottom.
3. The Baptism of Jesus. Depicting rays emanating from the Holy Spirit, in the shape of a dove, above a bearded Jesus, who is immersed just above his ankles, while John the Baptist affuses water over Jesus' head. A winged ministering angel, holding white lilies, hovers behind Jesus. We see nimbi on Jesus and John the Baptist.
4. St. Marguerite Marie Alacoque, patron saint for devotees of the Sacred Heart and against loss of parents. She received visions revealing the forms of Sacred Heart devotion: reception of Eucharist on the First Friday Devotions of each month, Eucharistic adoration during the Holy Hour on Thursdays, and celebration of the Feast of the Sacred Heart.
5. The Holy Family, with the Sacred Heart shown within the Child Jesus' bosom, surrounded by children. Titled Children's Hearts Offering.

The five windows in the west side aisle, or the right side, from the front to the back are depictions of:

1. The Holy Family, with Child Jesus feeding a rooster. Jesus compared His care for Jerusalem to that of a hen for her brood.
2. The Assumption of Mary.
3. Saints Cyril and Methodius, known as the Apostles to the Slavs, were ecumenical in their outlook and may be patron saints for Ecumenism. They are titled as saints equal-to-apostles by the Eastern Orthodox Church and by Eastern Catholic Churches that are in full communion with the Holy See. But, there is little record of Christian influence on Polish tribes before the 960s. Only St. Methodius wears a golden mitra auriphrygiata.
4. A wooden cross, draped in black cloth, with the inscription 966 and the Sacred Heart above a ship anchor on the cross. A foreboding sky filled with dark grey clouds, except for a golden sun in the upper right corner. The background featuring Sigismund's Column and titled Poland in Chains.
5. Saint Adalbert of Prague, patron saint of Poland. He was martyred in his efforts to convert Baltic Prussian tribes, over 200 years before the Prussian Crusade, after destroying a pagan sacred grove.

Three windows, in the choir, depict, from west to east:

1. Saint Casimir, patron saint of Lithuania, Poland, and the young. He was crown prince of the Kingdom of Poland and of the Grand Duchy of Lithuania.
2. Saint Cecilia, patron saint for musicians and of Church music. She is one of seven women, excluding the Blessed Virgin Mary, commemorated by name in the Canon of the Mass.
3. Saint Blaise, patron saint of against illness of the throat and for protection of domestic animals, holding two candles. He is one of the Fourteen Holy Helpers.

In 1987 the windows were repaired and protected, from the elements and vandals, with exterior acrylic panels.

==== Stations of the Cross ====
Fourteen Stations of the Cross are placed along the walls of the side aisles. Used together with prayers, meditations, and songs, they are a devotion to Jesus, either private or public, commemorating the Passion; they are a pilgrimage to the holy places in Jerusalem.

== School ==
Immaculate Heart of Mary had a school for students K-8. staffed by the Sisters of Saint Joseph of the Third Order St. Francis-Marymount Province (Garfield Heights). In 1988, Immaculate Heart of Mary school merged with nearby Sacred Heart Parish. The school was renamed Jesus and Mary School. In 2003, citing low enrollment and competition from nearby Saint Stanislaus Parish School, Jesus and Mary School closed.
