= De Berghes-Saint-Winoc =

Flemish noble family

(de) Berghes-Saint-Winoc Berghes - St.Winocx
- Country: Spanish Netherlands Austrian Netherlands
- Titles: Lords of Coupigny; Lords of Fromentel; Barons of Zetrud; Viscounts of Arleux; Dukes of Berghes-Saint-Winoc; Princes of Rache
- Cadet branches: Berghes-Berghes(+)

de Berghes-Saint-Winoc is an extinct Flemish noble house. The name's second part comes from early medieval abbot Saint Winnoc.

== Notables ==
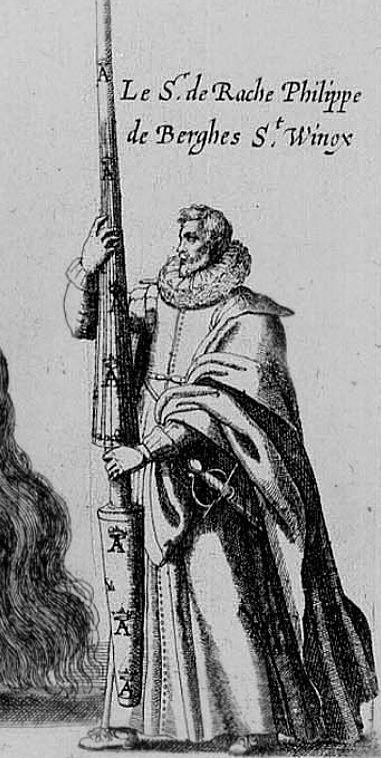
The Lord of Rache during the Funeral of Albert VII of Austria

=== Princes of Rache ===
Peter of Berghes-Saint-Winock, lord of Olhain;
married to Jeanne of Bailleul.

  1. Philippe I of Berghes-Saint-Winock, Lord of Rache;
    married to Hélène de Longueval
    1. Philippe II de Berghes-Saint-Winock, Lord of Rache;
      married to Marie-Françoise of Halewyn
      1. Eugène-Louis de Berghes-Saint-Winock, 1st Prince of Rache; Knight of the Golden Fleece
      2. Charles-Alexandre de Berghes-Saint-Winock, 2nd Prince of Rache;
        married to Lucie de Brouchoven
      3. Jean de Berghes Saint-Winoch, became after his marriage the founder of the Viscounts of Arleux-branche.
  2. Adrian of Berghes-Saint-Winock, lord of Olhain
    1. Jean de Berghes-Saint-Winock, lord of Olhain;
      married to Antoinette of Rambures
      1. Charles de Berghes-Saint-Winock, lord of Olhain

=== Viscounts of Arleux ===
Jean de Berghes-Saint-Winoch;
married to Anne de Vicamez; Viscountess of Arleux

  1. Pierre de Berghes-Saint-Winoch, Viscount of Arleux;
    married to Catherine de Haynin
    1. Philippe III Albert de Berghes-Saint-Winoch, Viscount of Arleux;
      married to Marie Madelein de Wignacourt
      1. Eustache-Joseph de Berghes-Saint-Winoch, Viscount of Arleux;
        married to Marie Françoise de Carnin
        1. François, Viscount of Berghes-Saint-Winoch
          1. Charles-Alphonse, Duke of Berghes-Saint-Winoch;
            married to Victorine, Princesse de Broglie

== Others ==
- Rudolph de Landas Berghes

== See also ==
- The Flemish house of Glymes-Berghes, Princes of Grimberghes and Marquesses of Berghes-Sur-le Zoom.
