= John Churchill Sibley =

- Predecessor: Frederick Ebenezer Lloyd
- Successor: Ebenezer Johnson Anderson

Orders
- Ordination: 1924 by Frederick Ebenezer Lloyd
- Consecration: 8 September 1929 by Frederick Ebenezer Lloyd

Personal details
- Born: 12 December 1858 Crewkerne, Somerset, England
- Died: 15 December 1938 (aged 80)
- Denomination: Orthodox Catholic Church in the British Empire

John Churchill Sibley was Director of the Queen’s Music in England and later was the Archbishop Metropolitan of the Orthodox Catholic Church in the British Empire.

== Early life ==
Sibley was born on 12 December 1858 in Crewkerne, Somerset and became a boarder at the local school, where he learned to play the school organ.

At 18 he became a teacher at Clifton Grammar School in Warwickshire, where he was also the organist. To avoid making a noise, he practiced on a small harmonium. without using the bellows.

== Director of Music ==
Sibley worked as an organist at several schools and churches, and at the Royal Albert Hall Festival Concerts for 20 years.

In 1891, he became Head of Music and Organist of the Goldsmith’s Institute (now Goldsmith’s College). He was also one of the first Directors of Studies of the Victoria College of Music.

He gained his honorary Doctor of Music degree in 1894.

He was appointed to the position of Director of the Queen's Music and became well known as a composer of both sacred and secular music. He continued to work both as a conductor and composer.

== Archbishop ==
During the 1920s, Sibley met Archbishop Frederick E.J. Lloyd, leader of the American Catholic Church. In 1924, Lloyd ordained Sibley as a priest.

When he retired in 1929, he determined to devote the remainder of his life to serving God, and after his consecration as a bishop by Lloyd in 1929, he returned to England as Archbishop Metropolitan of the Orthodox Catholic Church in the British Empire.

== Religious instruction and community ==
Sibley established an Intercollegiate University, which offered degrees to clergymen from various denominations after appropriate studies. Lloyd had already set up a similar facility in America, supported by his wealthy wife, but Sibley had no such financial backer and eventually the British university, which never made a profit, died out. Eventually through his meeting with John Ward and the subsequent admission to the Confraternity of the Orthodox Catholic Church, Sibley found some success.

An article in the John Bull magazine focussed on the university, calling Sibley 'the most Rev. Dr. Bunkum' and a dealer in 'bogus Degrees.' A later article called him 'a notorious charlatan'. The university changed its management soon after.

Sibley planned to establish a religious community and sought to purchase Minster Abbey on the Isle of Thanet in the River Thames, which St Sexburga had once led. However, after the article in John Bull, the plan fell through and the abbey went to Benedictine nuns from Germany. It was through this contact that some of the bones of St Sexburga came into the possession of John Ward (Sibley’s successor) and the Abbey of Christ the King. They are preserved at St Michael's in Caboolture, Australia.

== Death and Beatification ==
Sibley died just after his 80th birthday, on 15 December 1938. His funeral was arranged by John S. M. Ward and he was buried in High Barnet cemetery with his wife. He was later raised to the ranks of the Blessed Saints of God.

== Bibliography ==
- Handel at Canons
- The Voice and its Control
- Steps in Harmony
