= Syracuse Telegram and Courier =

- Syracuse Telegram, 1901
- Type: Daily newspaper
- Format: Broadsheet
- Owner: Charles E. Handy (1902)
- Publisher: The Courier Publishing Co.
- Editor: F. L. Hagadorn (1856); Charles E. Handy (1902)
- Founded: 1856
- Ceased publication: November 22, 1905
- Headquarters: Courier Buildings; Montgomery and Genesee Streets; Syracuse, New York
- Circulation: 17,120 (1900)
- Price: 1-cent (1905)

The Syracuse Telegram and Courier was a daily newspaper serving Syracuse, New York. The paper was founded in 1856 and published under a series of different names until it stopped publishing in 1905 due to high levels of debt.

== Logos 1865 ==
The Syracuse Daily Courier and Union logo, published on June 12, 1865:

Syracuse Daily Courier and Union, logo, June 12, 1865

The logo published on January 13, 1867 was titled Syracuse Courier and Union:

Syracuse Courier and Union, logo, January 13, 1867

== Logos 1889–1897 ==
The logo published on March 9, 1889 was titled The Syracuse Courier:

The Syracuse Courier, logo, March 9, 1889

== Logos 1898–1905 ==
The first logo published on January 1, 1898 was titled The Evening Telegram and Courier:

The Evening Telegram and Courier, logo, January 1, 1898

On May 16, 1905, the newspaper was simply known as Syracuse Telegram":

Syracuse Telegram, logo, May 16, 1905

By May 30, 1905, as a result of new ownership, the newspaper sported the Syracuse Telegram logo:

Syracuse Telegram, logo, May 30, 1905
