= Frederick Ebenezer Lloyd =

American bishop

Frederick Ebenezer John Lloyd (1859–1933) was an independent Catholic bishop with the American Catholic Church and founder of the Order of Antioch. He was born at Milford Haven, Wales, United Kingdom.

He was ordained as a deacon in the Church of England and served in Canada and the US. He married Joanna Genge and they had two children. After Joanna's death he married Ada Green and they had eight children. After Ada's death he married Philena Peabody. He had an interest in music and politics and from 1912 to 1914 he was a member of the House of Representatives for Chicago.

In 1915, René Vilatte founded the American Catholic Church. He received Lloyd into the church and on 19 December 1915, Lloyd was consecrated as a bishop at Saint David's Chapel on East Thirty-Sixth Street, Chicago. Vilatte was assisted by Bishop Paolo Miraglia-Gulotti. During the consecration the archbishop addressed the congregation and newly consecrated prelate saying:

It needs to prophet to fortell for you and the American Catholic Church a great future in the Province of God. The need for a Church both American and Catholic, and free from paparchy and all foreign denominations, has been felt for many years by Christians of all the denominations. May your zeal and apostolic ministry be crowned with success.

Vilatte officially retired at a synod held in Chicago on 10 April 1920, and named Lloyd as his successor as Primate and Metropolitan of the American Catholic Church (ACC).

Lloyd was president of an intercollegiate university in Kansas, which offered correspondence degrees to clergymen from various denominations. This was financially supported by his wealthy wife.

After a disagreement with the Syrian Orthodox Church, Lloyd set up the Order of Antioch in 1928. The Order of Antioch recognizes the Malankara Orthodox Syrian Church (also known as the Indian Orthodox Church) as its parent body.

On 8 September 1929, he consecrated John Churchill Sibley as Missionary Archbishop and Vicar General of the Order of Antioch in England. When travelling in London, Lloyd and Sibley were given the use of the Armenian Church of St. Sarkis, until 1934.

Lloyd and Sibley extended the university to England. An article in the John Bull magazine focussed on the institute, stating that it dealt in 'bogus Degrees'. The university changed its management and eventually closed soon after Sibley's death.

The spread of the American Catholic Church from 1920 until his death in 1933 was largely due to his initiative.
