= Rudolph de Landas Berghes =

Old Catholic bishop

- Archbishop of the Old Roman Catholic Church of America
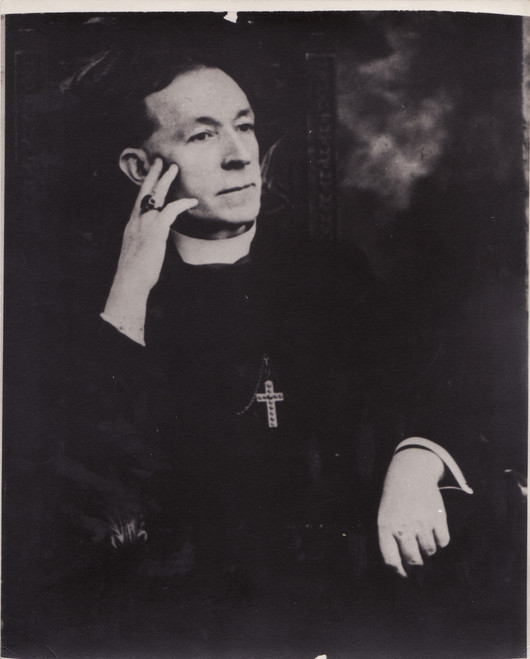
- Successor: Carmel Henry Carfora

Personal details
- Born: November 1, 1873 Naples, Kingdom of Italy
- Died: 17 November 1920 (aged 47) Villanova, Pennsylvania
- Denomination: Anglican, Old Catholic, Roman Catholic

Ordination history of de Landas Berghes
History
Priestly ordination
- Ordained by: Arnold Mathew
Episcopal consecration
- Consecrated by: Arnold Mathew
Episcopal succession
Bishops consecrated by de Landas Berghes as principal consecrator
- William Henry Francis (Note: Francis was also known as William Henry Francis Brothers with his matrynomic surname added): October 3, 1916
- Carmel Henry Carfora: October 4, 1916
- Stanislaus Mickiewicz: 1917

Rodolphe Francois Ghislain de Lorraine de Landas Berghes St. Winock (November 1, 1873 – November 17, 1920), better known as Rudolph de Landas Berghes, was Regionary Bishop of Scotland of the Old Roman Catholic Western Orthodox Church and later Archbishop of the Old Roman Catholic Church of America. (Note: Berghes used the label "Old Roman Catholic Western Orthodox Church" for Mathew's group. But Mathew identified the group with a variety of labels which included: "English Catholic Church", "Western Orthodox Catholic Church in Great Britain and Ireland", "Catholic Church in England, Latin Uniate Branch", "The Catholic Church in England", "The Catholic Church of England", "The Catholic Church in England, Latin and Orthodox United", "Western Orthodox Church", "The 'Old' Catholic Church of England", and "The Ancient Catholic Church of England". Anson did not identify which label was the actual legal name of the group.) (Note: Berghes used the label "Old Roman Catholic Church of America" in 1915 for his group yet "Old Roman Catholic Church" was already incorporated by Joseph René Vilatte in Illinois in 1904 and located in Chicago. In 1917, "Old Roman Catholic Church of America" was still identified as Vilatte's sect in Chicago. While the "Catholic Church of North America (The)", associated with Francis, and the "North American Old Roman Catholic Diocese", associated with Berghes and Carfora, were both incorporated in Illinois in 1917 and located in and near Chicago.)

== In Europe ==
Berghes was born in Naples, Kingdom of Italy, the "son of Count de Landas Bourgogne de Rache and Adelaide M. de Gramont-Hamilton, and belonged to the noble family of De Berghes-Saint-Winoc." He "lived most of his life in England." "He claimed to have succeeded in 1907, to prince dukedom, of de Berghes, on letters approved by" King Leopold II of Belgium and Emperor Franz Joseph I of Austria, according to his obituary in the Philadelphia Evening Public Ledger. But his name was not found in Almanach de Gotha which began to list "Berghes-Saint-Winock" as an "extinct house" in 1908. (Note: Anson wrote only that, "It was well known that he [Berghes] was related to most royal and noble families included in the Almanach de Gotha" but Anson did not mention that Berghes himself was not found in any edition of that work. Anson mentioned that Berghes "also claimed kinship" with Alfred Douglas-Hamilton, 13th Duke of Hamilton and 10th Duke of Brandon. Berghes' attorney said that Berghes' mother was related to Alexander Hamilton.)

Frederick Cunliffe-Owen, a "chronicler of nobility", "in one of his newspaper articles, said that if" Berghes' name "was his right one he was a prince; but he could not be a prince, because the line of succession to the title passed in 1907." He said he was raised as a Protestant and educated at Eton College and the universities of Cambridge, Paris and Brussels. He completed courses in law, theology and military tactics.

At Cambridge, he reportedly became a supporter of the high church and became interested in Anglo-Catholicism. To avert this, his mother reportedly made him transfer to the Faculty of Protestant Theology at the University of Paris.

According to The New York Times, he "described himself as" an "ex-staff officer of the British Army, with the rank of Captain." According to his obituary, he "declared in statements after his arrival at Villanova that he had seen service under" Herbert Kitchener, 1st Earl Kitchener, both in Sudan and in Egypt. Cunliffe-Owen asserted that Berghes also claimed service under Kitchener in the Second Boer War.

Berghes claimed, according to his obituary, that he attained "the rank of lieutenant colonel before leaving the army". Cunliffe-Owen "asserted that if" Berghes "was in the British Army he must have been under some other name," because the "army lists," Cunliffe-Owen "alleged, do not contain a name similar to his."

He said that later, he joined the Church of England and received orders there but the question of the validity of his orders bothered him. It was for this reason that he joined the Old Catholic Church. He joined the Old Catholic Church in 1910. According to Peter Anson, in Wandering Bishops, either Baroness Natalie Uxkull-Gyllenband or Olga Novikov introduced Berghes to Arnold Harris Mathew, a controversial figure who was consecrated in 1908 by Union of Utrecht (UU) bishops as a regionary bishop but ignored UU rules and seceded from the UU in 1910.

Mathew ordained Berghes in a private oratory in November, 1912, in Bedford Park, London, (Note: Mathew's group was not a sect which legally owned property or legally incorporated congregations. For example, Anson described Mathew's first episcopal function as the ordination of an independent congregational minister, W. Noel Lambert, who "placed his chapel at Mathew's disposal" as Lambert was the legal owner. Mathew was associated with other chapels but "[m]ost of these chapels were rooms in private houses" and Mathew "used [... a] private oratory [... in] Bedford Park, for most pontifical functions", according to Anson.) and consecrated him in June, 1913, as Mathew's regionary bishop of Scotland. Notably, months before Berghes' consecration, a London jury found that "the words were true in substance and in fact" that Mathew was, among other things, a "pseudo-bishop", and, months after Berghes' consecration, according to Peter-Ben Smit, in Old Catholic and Philippine Independent Ecclesiologies in History, "ties of the IBC with Mathew were formally severed." When, according to Anson, "they issued a formal statement that [...] Mathew had ceased to be an Old Catholic on December 29, 1910, and that after that date they recognized none of his episcopal actions."

He was, according to Anson, "an Austro-Hungarian subject" who was liable to capture and internment "as an enemy alien" for the duration of the war, so "with the connivance of the Foreign Office" Berghes left, and arrived in the United States on November 16, 1914..

== In the United States ==
He is listed on passenger lists as having left from Liverpool on the S.S. New York on November 7, 1914. He arrived on November 16, 1914. Cunliffe-Owen incorrectly stated he arrived in 1912, while Anson cited 1914.

At the invitation of Protestant Episcopal Church of the United States (PECUSA) bishop David H. Greer of the Episcopal Diocese of New York, but without Mathew's authorization, Berghes participated in the consecration of Hiram Richard Hulse as the PECUSA Missionary Bishop of Cuba on January 12, 1915. In this way, it was asserted, there could be no doubt about the apostolic succession of Hulse or the validity of his orders from the Roman Catholic point of view in light of Pope Leo XIII's Apostolicae curae. It was reported on a society page a few days later that Berghes "is to be assigned as rector" of a PECUSA parish in New York City and that Greer "announce[d] that the appointment will be made."

After Hulse's consecration, newspapers questioned Berghes' true identity and so did PECUSA bishops. Allegations about his background were printed in newspapers. (Note: The two articles cited in the lawsuit are "Ancient princely house is extinct". s.n. New York. February 1915. "Who is bishop de Berghes Landas?". s.n. s.l.) PECUSA Bishop Philip M. Rhinelander, of the Episcopal Diocese of Pennsylvania, requested more information from Cunliffe-Owen about Berghes. Cunliffe-Owen wrote to Rhinelander that after Cunliffe-Owen had warned William T. Manning who warned Greer, Berghes "found Brooklyn and New York too hot for him and vanished." In 1915 Berghes filed a lawsuit against Cunliffe-Owen, an editor of the New-York Tribune, for libel. Berghes alleged in the complaint that Cunliffe-Owen' statements, "as to the genuineness of the temporal and ecclesiastical titles" that he used, "have caused him to be rejected" in PECUSA circles, "although", Berghes claimed, "he has been licensed as a priest" in the Episcopal Diocese of New Jersey. Berghes complained "that the article spoke sarcastically of him and intimated that he was masquerading under a pseudonym." Cunliffe-Owen compared Berghes to another bishop "who fell into disrepute because of irregular practices in London", Andrew Charles McLaglen; Berghes correctly stated that Cunliffe-Owen had mistaken him for McLaglen. (Note: Berghes and McLaglen were two different people.) Cunliffe-Owen "wrote that if" Berghes was McLaglen then "he had been exposed several times" in London newspapers for "religious and philanthropic swindles." But according to The New York Times, Cunliffe-Owen "did not say that" Berghes and "McLagen were the same. He merely, in his article and later in a private letter, showed points of similarity between the two."

Berghes "made the [...] claim of elevation to archbishop and metropolitan in 1916." He began calling himself the Archbishop of the Old Roman Catholic Church of America. He moved to St. Dunstan's Abbey in Waukegan, Illinois, and consecrated William Henry Francis, the abbot, and Carmel Henry Carfora as bishops on consecutive days in October, 1916. Carfora was his auxiliary bishop.

He consecrated Stanislaus Mickiewicz in 1917. William Wolkovich-Valkavicius called Mickiewicz, in Polish American Studies, a "major figure in the Lithuanian separatist movement." Mickiewicz, a Lithuanian, emigrated from the Russian Empire, worked in a Chicago, Illinois, "meat market for a short time." After he failed at three seminaries, Mickiewicz "turned to" Stephen Kaminski who ordained him in 1907. (Note: Wolkovich-Valkavicius wrote that some sources question if Mickiewicz was in fact ordained by Kaminski in 1907.) Mickiewicz, "apparently with no commitment to Kaminski," according to Wolkovich-Valkavicius, "became a free-lance priest" in New England. He was involved along with Bishop Franciszek Hodur of the Polish National Catholic Church (PNCC) in a schism dividing the St Joseph's Lithuanian Catholic congregation of the Roman Catholic Diocese of Scranton where a dissident group gained possession of the church. A lawsuit was filed demanding the restitution of the church. The court rendered a judgment which permanently restrained Hodur and Mickiewicz and ordered restoration of the property to the RCC. Mickiewicz was pastor of the independent Lithuanian parish in Scranton, Pennsylvania started by the dissidents. However, "because of his unsavory conduct," Mickiewicz "was charged with breach of discipline and left of his own accord rather than face expulsion." "Unimpeded," Mickiewicz "sped off to Lawrence, Massachusetts, drawn by" another parish conflict in a Lithuanian community with a "high proportion of socialists and freethinkers." "There he declared himself the 'Messenger of God', and Administrator of all independent Lithuanian parishes. By July 1916 he established a separatist church." "To upgrade his status," Mickiewicz "summoned a lay synod in June 1917, and arranged to be elected bishop by popular acclaim." De Landas Berghas then consecrated him as a bishop. Mickiewicz "then persuaded" de Landas Berghas, according to Wolkovich-Valkavicius, "to set up a mini-seminary in Lawrence, teaching and ordaining a half dozen Lithuanians." Mickiewicz "fell quickly," according to Wolkovich-Valkavicius. "His continued misconduct brought public censure from his people. [...] Intimations of 'heresy, impurity, drunkenness and falsehood' led" de Landas Berghas, "as Metropolitan of the Old Roman Catholic Church of America, to banish" Mickiewicz in 1918, "stripping him perpetually of orders and jurisdiction, according to the" Lawrence The Evening Tribune "account. The decree of December 3 was also signed by the regionary bishop, [...] Carfora at New York City. Several sources credit" Mickiewicz's "successor, [Stasys] Sleinis, with having a hand in the expulsion." (Note: Wolkovich-Valkavicius quoted from "Bishop Mickiewicz of this city deposed". The evening tribune. Lawrence, MA. 1918-12-24. LCCN sn86071612.) Mickiewicz moved from Lawrence to Chicago where he failed to "compete with" a Lithuanian parish in the Roman Catholic Archdiocese of Chicago. He later joined Francis who Berghes also consecrated.

Smit wrote that after World War I, the Old Catholic International Bishops' Conference (IBC) "distanced itself more from the 'episcopus vagans' Mathew and those ordained and consecrated by him."

Berghes applied to minister in the PECUSA. Bishop William Montgomery Brown, of the Episcopal Diocese of Arkansas, a Modernist and Communist later "known as the 'atheist bishop'," (Note: Within a year, in 1920, Brown self published Communism and Christianism. This book, according to John Kyser, in Louisiana History, was "perhaps one of the most amazing and bizarre ever written by a modern Christian bishop." Its publication led to "two heresy trials and an appeal" after which Brown "was deposed from his episcopal office in 1925." Among the facts revealed at the heresy trials was that, "Brown had contributed money to a group of Communists who had been arrested in Bridgman, Michigan, for plotting to overthrow the United States Government." Francis, who was consecrated by Berghes, consecrated Brown in 1925. Francis was an observer at Brown's appeal "since Brown was a bishop in his church. Furthermore, he had accepted Brown on the same creed which had been branded heresy by the" PECUSA.) presented "the correspondence and request of Count de Landes Berghes e de Roche" to the October 1919 General Convention of the Episcopal Church in the United States of America which referred the documents to a special committee consisting of the bishops who "confer with officials of the Eastern Orthodox Churches and the Old Catholics". The committee reported that they considered what was presented but were "not prepared to recommend any action". They reported, "the reception of a person applying to minister in" the PECUSA "belongs to the jurisdiction of the several Bishops of the same." So, the General Convention discharged the committee "from the further consideration of the subject." Brown resigned later that year.

Mathew died on December 19, 1919.

On November 22, 1919, he abandoned Old Catholicism and took a solemn vow of abjuration at the hands of Patrick Joseph Hayes, Archbishop of New York, in St. Patrick's Cathedral, New York. He converted to the Catholic Church, "renounced his titles", and entered the Augustinian St. Thomas Monastery in Villanova, Pennsylvania as a novice where he "died during his probation," several months later on November 17, 1920. He was buried in the monastery's cemetery.

He made "the claim," according to his obituary, "that through his efforts the American branch of the Old Catholics number[ed] in 1920 about 120,000 in Canada and the United States."

After Mathew died in 1919, the IBC declared in 1920 that Mathew's "consecration was obtained mala fide and that consequently it is null and void." Consecrations derived from Mathew were not recognised by the IBC. Smit wrote that, "the orders of episcopi vagantes in general, [...] and of all those consecrated by them, are not recognized, and all connections with these persons is formally denied" by the IBC.

== Name and title variations ==
Berghes was known by a variety of names and titles throughout his life and after.

- In 1915, his "full name and title" was reported as "the Rt. Rev. Bishop Prince de Landas Berghes et de Rache" in The Washington Post.
- In 1915, his full name was reported as "Rodolphe Francois Ghislain de Lorraine de Landas Berghes St. Winock", the name he gave in a 1915 legal complaint, according to The New York Times, New-York Tribune, and The Sun.
- In 1915, that he "shortened his name to Bishop de Landas Berghes" according to The Sun.
- In 1915, his "name in holy orders" was reported as "Bishop de Landas Berghes, Regionary Bishop of Scotland of the Old Roman Catholic Western Orthodox Church" in the New-York Tribune.
- In 1915 and 1916, his name and title were reported as "Rodolphe Francois Ghislain de Lorraine de Landas Berghes St. Winock, who described himself as Regionary Bishop of Scotland of the Old Roman Catholic Western Orthodox Church" in The New York Times, and reported as "Rodolphe Francois Ghislain de Lorraine de Landas Berghes St. Winock, who in holy orders is known as Regionary Bishop of Scotland of the old Roman Catholic Western Orthodox Church" in the New-York Tribune.
- In 1916, he called himself "Rodolphus Franciscus Edouarus St. Patricius Alphonsus Ghislain de Gramont Hamilton de Lorraine, Archiepiscopus Ecclesia Veteris Romanae Catholicae Americae, Princeps de Landas-Berghes St Winock et de Rache (de Lorraine Brabant)" in Carfora's instrument of consecration.
- In 1919, the PECUSA called him "Count de Landes Berghes e de Roche" in its General Convention journal.
- In 1920, the Philadelphia Evening Public Ledger reported that his "full name was the Most Reverend Prince and Duke de Landas Berghes St. Winock et de Rache, Rodolph Francois St. Patrice Alphonsus Ghislain de Gramont-Hamilton de Lorraine" in his obituary. The obituary was syndicated the next day in the New-York Tribune.
- In 1920, the Philadelphia Evening Public Ledger reported that he "prefer[ed] to be designated simply as Dr. Berghes".
- In 1920, Vers l'idéal reported that his "Rodolphe-François-Edouard-Saint-Patrice-Alphonse-Ghislain de Gramont-Hamilton de Lorraine, D. D. L. L. B. D., prince et duc de Landas-Berghes, Saint-Winock et de Rache, archevêque métropolitain des vieux-catholiques d'Amérique"
- In 1947, Brandreth called him "Prince de Landas Berghes et de Rache" in Episcopi Vagantes and the Anglican Church.
- In 1964, Anson called him "Rudolph Francis Edward St Patrick Alphonsus Ghislain de Gramont Hamilton de Lorraine-Brabant, Prince de Landas Berghes et de Rache, Duc de St Winock" in Bishops at Large.
