= Carmel Henry Carfora =

20th-century religious leader

Carmel Henry Alfonso Mary Carfora
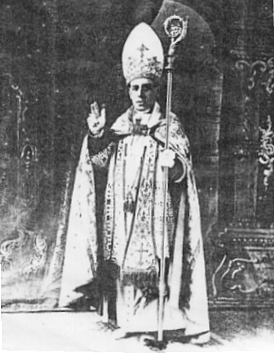
- Carfora in 1918
- Successor: Hubert Augustus Rogers

Personal details
- Born: August 27, 1878
- Died: January 18, 1958 (aged 79)
- Denomination: Old Roman Catholicism
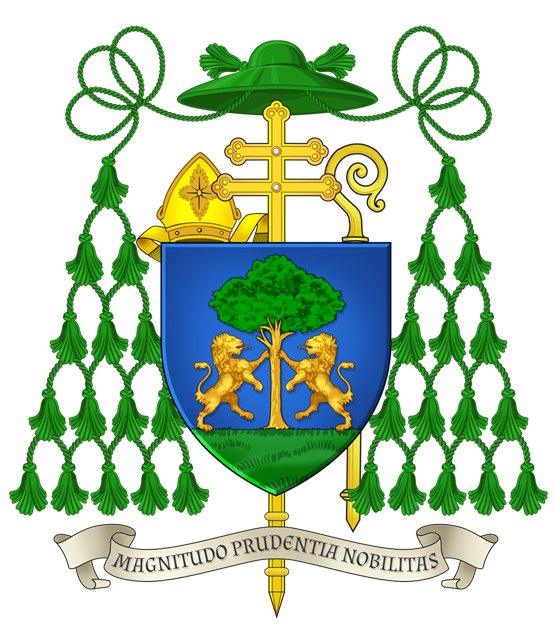
- Coat of arms

Henry Alfonso Mary Carfora (known as Carmel Henry Carfora; August 27, 1878 - January 11, 1958) was an Old Roman Catholic leader.

On 12 October 1919, he became the second leader of the North American Old Roman Catholic Church, succeeding Rudolph de Landas Berghes. Carfora remained in this position until his death on 11 January 1958. Carfora was succeeded by Hubert Augustus.

Carfora assumed leadership of a group of parishioners who broke away from St. Anthony of Padua Catholic Church, in Youngstown, Ohio, to found St. Rocco's Independent National Catholic Church on May 17, 1907.

His gravestone was replaced in 2015.

Preceded by Rudolph de Landas Berghes	Primate of the North American Old Roman Catholic Church; 1919–1958	Succeeded by Hubert Augustus Rogers
