= Eastern Orthodoxy in Uganda =

Eastern Orthodoxy in Uganda refers to adherents and religious communities of Eastern Orthodox Christianity in Uganda. Majority of Eastern Orthodox Christians in Uganda are under ecclesiastical jurisdiction of the Eastern Orthodox Patriarchate of Alexandria and all Africa.

According to the 2014 census, members of the Eastern Orthodox church made up 0.15% of the population.

== Organization ==
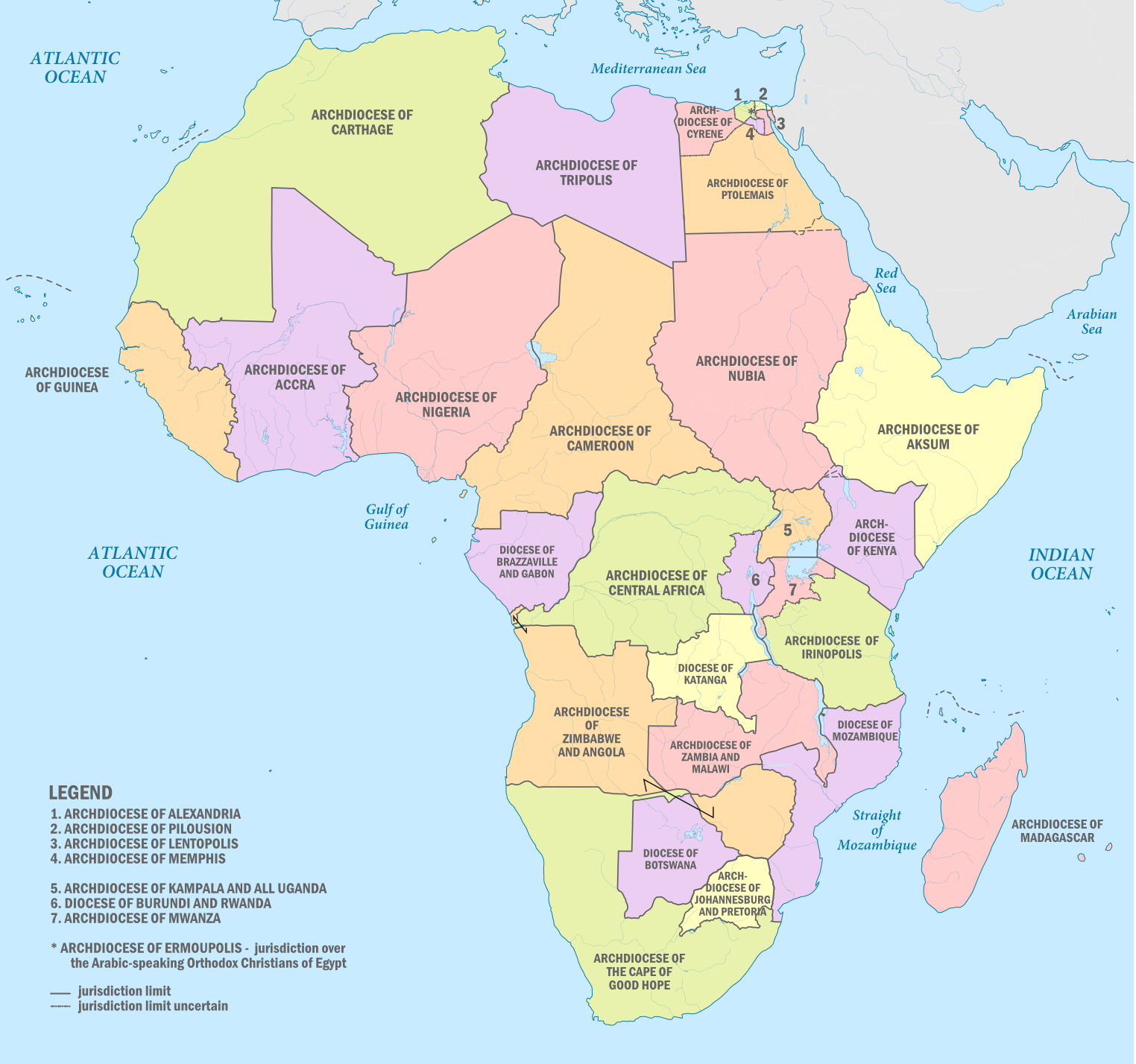
Archdioceses and Dioceses of the Eastern Orthodox Patriarchate of Alexandria and all Africa

Historically, Uganda was among the first Sub-Saharan countries where Eastern Orthodox Christian communities began to form. Currently there are nine deaneries which are united into a Metropolis headed by Metropolitan Jerome Muzeeyi, who succeeded Jonah Lwanga in 2021. The headquarters is in Namungoona, a neighborhood of the capital Kampala.

In 2022, the clergy consisted of over 76 priests and 5 deacons working across 100 communities, 41 church building, 17 medical clinics and the Holy Cross Orthodox Church Mission Hospital.

Approximately 500,000 Ugandans claim Orthodox baptism. Many parishes have schools, day and boarding schools. Tuition, accommodation and meals are paid for by parents or by the Church through support of sponsors from outside Uganda. The Church schools are administered by the Church management but follow the Ugandan Education system as by the Ugandan ministry of Education. Orthodox students who have been sponsored through the Church, usually return to teach in Church schools, but others also leave to teach at non-Orthodox schools. One of the more developed parishes is St. Antonios, Monde, near Wobulenzi. Father Antonios Mutyaba is the priest of that parish. At Monde there are a primary and secondary school, a hospital, a church of Saint Anthony the Great, and a female monastery (St. Mary of Egypt) with two sisters. Sister Maria is one of the first four young women who expressed an interest in monasticism in Uganda.

The Russian Orthodox Church also has a mission parish, the Annunciation Orthodox Church on Bukasa Island in Lake Victoria. The parish was founded in 1983, and now is under the spiritual Omophore of Metropolitan Hilarion of ROCOR. Father Christopher Walusimbi is the parish priest. He has taken care of orphans and operates an ambulance service and was instrumental in the establishment of a school and a medical clinic. Both the school and clinic were dedicated to Saint Panteleimon of Nicomedia, but the Ugandan government assumed control and secularized them. The clinic which was started by Fr. Gerasimos in 1983 was abandoned after his expulsion from Uganda in 1988, however the use of aid from the Japanese government finished the clinic. Fr. Christopher planned and built the stone church building which is topped by a multi-colored Russian onion dome.

== See also ==
- Religion in Uganda
- Eastern Orthodox Patriarchate of Alexandria
- Ruben Spartas Mukasa
- Chrysostomos Papasarantopoulos
- Jonah (Lwanga) of Kampala
- George Alexander McGuire
- African Orthodox Church (non-canonical)
- Raphael Morgan
