= Jonah Lwanga =

Ugandan prelate (1945–2021)

His Eminence Jonah Lwanga
- Archbishop of Kampala and Exarch of All Uganda
- Church: Eastern Orthodox Church of Alexandria
- Archdiocese: Kampala and All Uganda
- See: Kampala
- Appointed: 12 May 1997
- Term ended: 5 September 2021
- Predecessor: Theodoros Nankyama
- Previous posts: Secretary, Orthodox Mission in Uganda (1979–1981); Dean, Archbishop Makarios III Patriarchal Orthodox Seminary; Vicar Bishop of Bukoba (1992–1997)

Orders
- Ordination: 1982
- Consecration: 27 January 1992
- Rank: Metropolitan

Personal details
- Born: Jonah Lwanga; July 18, 1945 Ddegeya, Luweero District, Uganda
- Died: September 5, 2021 (aged 76) Athens, Greece
- Citizenship: Ugandan
- Residence: Kampala, Uganda
- Occupation: Orthodox prelate, theologian
- Education: Ecclesiastical School of Crete; University of Athens

Jonah Lwanga also referred to as Metropolitan Jonah Lwanga (18 July 1945 – 5 September 2021) was a Ugandan prelate, who served as Archbishop of Kampala and Exarch of All Uganda in the Uganda Orthodox Church. Since 1997, he was also the Metropolitan of the Metropolis of Kampala and All Uganda, in Central Africa under the Eastern Orthodox Church of Alexandria, until his death in September 2021. His see was Kampala, with jurisdiction over all Uganda.

== Early life and education ==
Lwanga was born on 18 July 1945 in the village of Ddegeya in present-day Luweero District, Uganda to Kezia Babitaka. Lwanga's grandfather, Obadiah Basajjakitalo, was one of the two initial leaders of the Orthodox Church in Uganda along with Ruben Spartas Mukasa.

He completed his general education in Bulemezi and Kyaddondo, Uganda (1952-1964).

From 1964 to 1968 he studied at the Ecclesiastical School of Crete. From 1968 to 1978 he held a degree in Theology and Philosophy from the University of Athens.

== Vocation ==
From 1979 to 1981 he served as Secretary of the Orthodox Mission in Uganda.

Lwanga was ordained a deacon on 1 May 1981 and a year later, in 1982, he was ordained a priest.

After his ordination, Lwanga was appointed Dean at the Archbishop Makarios III Patriarchal Orthodox Seminary in Riruta, Nairobi, and taught theology. He was subsequently elevated to the status of Archimandrite in 1992. Shortly after, he was ordained the Vicar Bishop of Bukoba, Tanzania on 27 January 1992.

On 12 May 1997, Lwanga was transferred from the Bishopric of Bukoba, Tanzania, to Uganda as Metropolitan of Kampala and All Uganda after the death of Metropolitan Theodoros Nankyama.

=== Inter Religious Council of Uganda ===
Alongside Archbishop Livingstone Mpalanyi Nkoyoyo, Sheikh Shaban Mubajje and Cardinal Emmanuel Wamala. Lwanga was a co-founder of the Inter Religious Council of Uganda in 2002. At the time of his death, was a Member, Council of presidents, a position he had held since the time of the body's inception.

== Death ==
Lwanga was pronounced dead on 5 September 2021 in Athens, Greece. The cause of death was given as prostate cancer in some sources while others mentioned a "long illness".

== See also ==
- Eastern Orthodoxy in Uganda
- Chrysostomos Papasarantopoulos
- Cyprian Kizito Lwanga

Eastern Orthodox Church titles
Preceded by see created	Bishop of Bukoba (Tanzania); 1992-1997	Succeeded by Porphyrios (Skikos)
Preceded by Theodoros Nankyamas	Metropolitan of Kampala and All Uganda; 1997–2021	Succeeded by Jerome (Muzeeyi)
