= George Alexander McGuire =

American physician and bishop

The Most Reverend George Alexander McGuire
- Archbishop of the African Orthodox Church
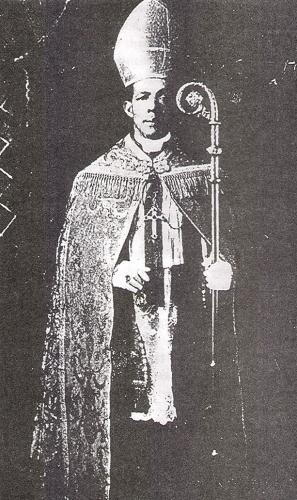
- Church: African Orthodox Church
- In office: 1921–1934

Orders
- Consecration: by Rene Vilatte

Personal details
- Born: 28 March 1866 Swetes, Antigua
- Died: 10 November 1934 (aged 68) New York City

George Alexander McGuire (28 March 1866 – 10 November 1934) was the founder of the African Orthodox Church, and a prominent member of Marcus Garvey's Universal Negro Improvement Association (UNIA).

== Biography ==
=== Early life and adulthood ===
McGuire was born to an Afro-Caribbean family on 28 March 1866 in Swetes, Antigua; McGuire's father was Anglican, and his mother was Moravian. In his adulthood, he studied at the Moravian Miskey Seminary in the Danish West Indies, and at Mico College's Antigua campus. From 1888 to 1894, McGuire served as pastor of a Moravian Church in the Danish West Indies.

=== Immigration and priesthood ===
In 1894, McGuire immigrated to the United States. He initially joined the African Methodist Episcopal Church, which was the first independent black Christian denomination in the country, founded in the early nineteenth century. On 2 January 1895, McGuire formally joined the Protestant Episcopal Church in the United States, and two years later he was ordained as a priest.

McGuire led small, predominantly African American churches in Cincinnati, Ohio; Richmond, Virginia; and Philadelphia. St. Philip's Episcopal Church of Richmond, Virginia lists "Reverend George Alexander McQuire" as rector from April 1898 to November 1900. After McGuire's tenure, the Rev. Robert Josias "Raphael" Morgan was listed as the rector there from "1901 – April 1901", likely acting on an interim basis until a full-time rector was called.

By 1901, McGuire was appointed rector of St. Thomas' Episcopal Church in Philadelphia; this was the first black congregation in the Episcopal Church. It had been started in 1794 by Absalom Jones, earlier a founder with Richard Allen of the Free African Society. This mutual aid society preceded the African Methodist Episcopal Church founded by Allen. McGuire was rector of St. Thomas from 1902–05.

From 1905 to 1909, McGuire served as Archdeacon for Colored Work in the Diocese of Arkansas. Eventually, McGuire resigned and relocated to Cambridge, Massachusetts. There he established St. Bartholomew's Church for West Indians who were living in the Boston area. While in Cambridge, McGuire also studied at Boston College of Physicians and Surgeons, receiving his M.D. degree in 1910. When his small church was not recognized by the Episcopal diocese, McGuire resigned in 1911.

=== Return to Antigua ===
In 1913, McGuire returned to the West Indies, caring for his mother. While there he served for the Church of England in Antigua.

=== Return to the United States ===
Returning to the United States in 1918, he joined the UNIA and was appointed chaplain-general for the organization. In this position, McGuire wrote two important documents of the Universal Negro Improvement Association—Universal Negro Ritual, and Universal Negro Catechism, the latter containing both religious and historical sections, reflecting his interest in religion and race history.

In 1919, McGuire established the Independent Episcopal Church of the Good Shepherd. Not long after, he was elected bishop by a group of autonomously governed black Episcopal churches from the United States, Canada, and Cuba. On 2 September 1921, in the Independent Episcopal Church of the Good Shepherd in New York City, McGuire and participating black churches formed the African Orthodox Church.

Article one of the constitution for the African Orthodox church stated the following:

The name of this church, which was organized September 2nd, 1921, is and shall be THE AFRICAN ORTHODOX CHURCH. Its faith as declared, is Orthodox, in conformity with the Orthodox Churches of the East from which its Episcopate is derived. While it admits to membership and other privileges persons of all races, IT SEEKS PARTICULARLY TO REACH OUT TO THE MILLIONS OF AFRICAN DESCENT IN BOTH HEMISPHERES, and declares itself to be perpetually autonomous and controlled by Negroes. Hence the name, AFRICAN ORTHODOX.

Initiating negotiations for episcopal ordination, McGuire sought to acquire apostolic succession for this independent church; he first sought consecration through Patrick Cardinal Hayes of the Roman Catholic Archdiocese of New York, and Bishop William T. Manning of the Episcopal Diocese of New York. Both individuals denied his request, including officials from the Russian Orthodox Church. Following these series of denials, McGuire was consecrated by Rene Vilatte of the American Catholic Church, (Note: Joseph René Vilatte was ordained to the diaconate on 6 June 1885, and to the priesthood on 7 June 1885, by Bishop Eduard Herzog, the Old Catholic Bishop of Berne, Switzerland. Vilatte's episcopal consecration took place on 29 May 1892, in the Cathedral of Archbishop Alvares in Colombo (Ceylon), when he was consecrated by the Western Rite Jacobite Bishop Mar Julious I (Antonio Francisco Xavier Alvares, of the Brahmavar (Goan) Orthodox Church) and by two other Jacobite bishops, with the permission of the Jacobite Patriarch of Antioch Ignatius Peter IV (III). Vilatte's longtime goal had been to be recognized as the "Old Catholic Archbishop of North America." The Jacobites consecrated him as: "Mar Timotheous I, Jacobite Old Catholic Bishop of North America." The Episcopal Church subsequently excommunicated Vilatte. The Roman Catholic Church excommunicated him both in 1900 and in 1907 (but he was reconciled to Rome from 1925 up to his death in 1929). As bishop, Rene Vilatte consecrated more than 20 new bishops and new churches. Because these consecrations were made outside the authority of the Church, they were called into question. The Syro-Jacobite Church officially withdrew recognition of the secession churches in 1938. Vilatte was accused of not upholding the canons. He was excluded from the jurisdiction of the Church of Antioch and was considered an Episcopi vagantes. Some of the Old Catholic sects descended from Vilatte's consecrations claim that, although he had practically abandoned any connection with the Jacobites, some of the Jacobite sects in India consider him a "Saint". The validity of Vilatte's Orders in the Roman Catholic Church was never settled, but most non-Roman Old Catholics maintain that his Orders were valid.) who was made bishop through an Oriental Orthodox church after having sought consecrations from numerous mainstream Episcopal, Old Catholic, and Eastern Orthodox bodies. Vilatte was assisted by Bishop Carl A. Nybladh, who was previously consecrated by him.

=== Meeting with the Ecumenical Patriarch ===
McGuire attempted to gain recognition from the Greek Orthodox Ecumenical Patriarch of Constantinople. In December 1921, three months after his consecration, McGuire—through the intercession of Eastern Orthodox prelates—was granted an audience with Patriarch Meletios while the latter was on a visit to New York City. McGuire claimed that the patriarch accepted the African Orthodox Church as an Orthodox jurisdiction, but would not afford it communion with Eastern Orthodoxy until it demonstrated stability and growth. Nonetheless, the African Orthodox Church was essentially Anglo-Catholic, and it was Orthodox only to the extent that its leader had the title of patriarch, that the original form of the Nicene Creed had been adopted, and that its episcopal source was in an Oriental Orthodox church.

=== Church consolidation and growth ===
In 1924, the newly organized conclave of African Orthodox Church unanimously elected McGuire as archbishop of the church. During the remaining decade of his life, the official organ of African Orthodox Church—The Negro Churchman—was an effective link for the far-flung organization, with McGuire as its editor. Endich Theological Seminary was founded shortly thereafter, as well as an Order of Deaconesses.

In 1925, McGuire founded an African Orthodox parish in West Palm Beach, Florida. Two years after that, he consecrated Daniel William Alexander—an African clergyman—as metropolitan archbishop for South Africa and central and southern Africa. At the same time, McGuire was elected patriarch of the denomination with the title Alexander I. The church spread to Uganda as well, where it grew to about 10,000 members.

On 8 November 1931, McGuire dedicated Holy Cross Pro-Cathedral in Harlem (New York).

=== Death ===
McGuire died 10 November 1934; he is buried in Woodlawn Cemetery in the Bronx, New York. He was survived by his wife, Ada Robert McGuire (also a native of Antigua), and one daughter. At the time of his death in 1934, the African Orthodox Church claimed over 30,000 members, fifty clergy, and thirty churches located on three continents: North America, South America and Africa. (Note: In 1946 the African-based portion of McGuire's "African Orthodox Church" in Kenya and Uganda went under the jurisdiction of the Greek Orthodox Patriarchate of Alexandria and All Africa. By 2010, the Eastern Orthodox Church in Kenya had over 650,000 members, making it the largest Orthodox Church in Africa.)

== See also ==
- African Orthodox Church
- Harlem Renaissance
- Raphael Morgan
- Eastern Orthodoxy in Uganda

== Sources ==
- Byron Rushing. "A Note on the Origin of the African Orthodox Church." The Journal of Negro History 57:1 (Jan. 1972).
- David Levinson. African Orthodox Church. In: Stephen D. Glazier (Ed.). Encyclopedia of African and African-American Religions. Routledge Encyclopedias of Religion and Society. Taylor & Francis, 2001. pp. 15–16.
- Frank S Mead. Handbook of Denominations in the United States. 10th Ed. Nashville: Abingdon Press, 1995.
- Gavin White. Patriarch McGuire and the Episcopal Church. In: Randall K. Burkett and Richard Newman (Eds.). Black Apostles: Afro-American Clergy Confront the Twentieth Century. G. K. Hall, 1978. pp. 151–180.
- John Hope Franklin and August Meier (Eds.). Black Leaders of the Twentieth Century. Chicago: University of Illinois Press, 1982.
- Makarios (Tillyrides) of Kenya. The Origin of Orthodoxy in East Africa]. Orthodox Research Institute.
- Rachel Gallaher. McGuire, George Alexander (1866–1934). BlackPast.org.
- Rayford W. Logan and Michael R. Winston (Eds.). Dictionary of American Negro Biography. New York: W.W. Norton, 1982.
- Right Rev. Philippe L. De Coster (B.Th., D.D. (Belgium), Latin Old Roman Catholic Church of Flanders). African Orthodox Church: Its General History . 1st Ed. Publ. Eucharist and Devotion, 1993–2008. 67 pp.
- Theodore Natsoulas. Patriarch McGuire and the Spread of the African Orthodox Church to Africa. Journal of Religion in Africa, Vol. 12, Fasc. 2 (1981), pp. 81–104.
- Tony Martin. McGuire, George Alexander. Encyclopedia of the Harlem Renaissance. Volume 2. Cary D. Wintz, Paul Finkelman (Eds.). Taylor & Francis, 2004. pp. 776–777.
- Warren C. Platt. The African Orthodox Church: An Analysis of Its First Decade. Church History, Vol. 58, No. 4 (Dec. 1989), pp. 474–488.
