= St. John Coltrane African Orthodox Church =

Church in San Francisco

Coordinates: 37.8069°N 122.4308°W

St. John Will-I-Am Coltrane African Orthodox Church
- Religious icon depicting John Coltrane by Mark Dukes
- Classification: African Orthodox Church
- Region: San Francisco, California, US
- Language: English
- Founder: Franzo and Marina King
- Origin: 1969; 57 years ago
- Official website: www.coltranechurch.org

The St. John Will-I-Am Coltrane African Orthodox Church is a Christian congregation in San Francisco, California, United States, centered on the music of jazz saxophonist John Coltrane. The church was founded in 1969 by Franzo and Marina King in the years following a spiritual experience during a 1965 John Coltrane concert. Though its beliefs varied over time, the church initially venerated Coltrane as an incarnation of the Christian god and his album A Love Supreme as a sacred text. The church has also been known for its social activism, including a free vegetarian meal program that ran for decades, and for incorporating jazz improvisation into its services.

In the 1970s, the Kings briefly followed Coltrane's widow, musician Alice Coltrane, as a Hindu guru before returning to Christian practice. A 1981 lawsuit filed by Alice Coltrane drew the attention of the African Orthodox Church, and the church joined in 1982. After occupying several locations in San Francisco, it continues to hold weekly services combining jazz and Christian liturgy as of 2026.

== History ==
On September 18, 1965, Franzo and Marina King went to The Jazz Workshop in the North Beach neighborhood of San Francisco to see John Coltrane perform. They describe the experience of seeing Coltrane play as a spiritual transformation they refer to as their "sound baptism". In the following years, they began to invite friends to their home to listen to jazz records from a spiritual perspective. This custom evolved into an informal jazz club they called The Yardbird Club, after saxophonist Charlie Parker's nickname, "Yardbird". This club evolved into a church that was founded in 1969 and took several names over the subsequent years: the Yardbird Temple, the Yardbird Vanguard Revolutionary Church of the Hour, and the One Mind Temple Evolutionary Transitional Church of Christ.

"Part 1: Acknowledgement"
The first 30 seconds of John Coltrane's A Love Supreme, played at church services

The initial location of the church was a storefront in the Visitacion Valley neighborhood. It subsequently moved to a storefront on Divisadero Street, which it resided for almost 30 years. Huey P. Newton, a founder of the Black Panther Party, became a mentor of Franzo King and supporter of the church, and the church helped raise money for Black Panther events. To recognize their help, Emory Douglas, the minister of culture for the Black Panthers, created the church's first painting of Coltrane. In 1972, the church's band opened for soul duo Ike & Tina Turner at an event for the Black Panthers' Community Survival Program. Another supporter of the church was guitarist Carlos Santana.

The Kings describe their work with the church as supporting racial equity for African Americans in San Francisco. Similarly to how the Black Panther Party was operating in Oakland, the church served free daily vegetarian meals, sometimes to hundreds of people. Marina King said that, because of these free vegetarian meals, a nickname for the church was "the Beans and Rice Church". Their activities included hatha yoga classes, prayer, fasting, and meditation.

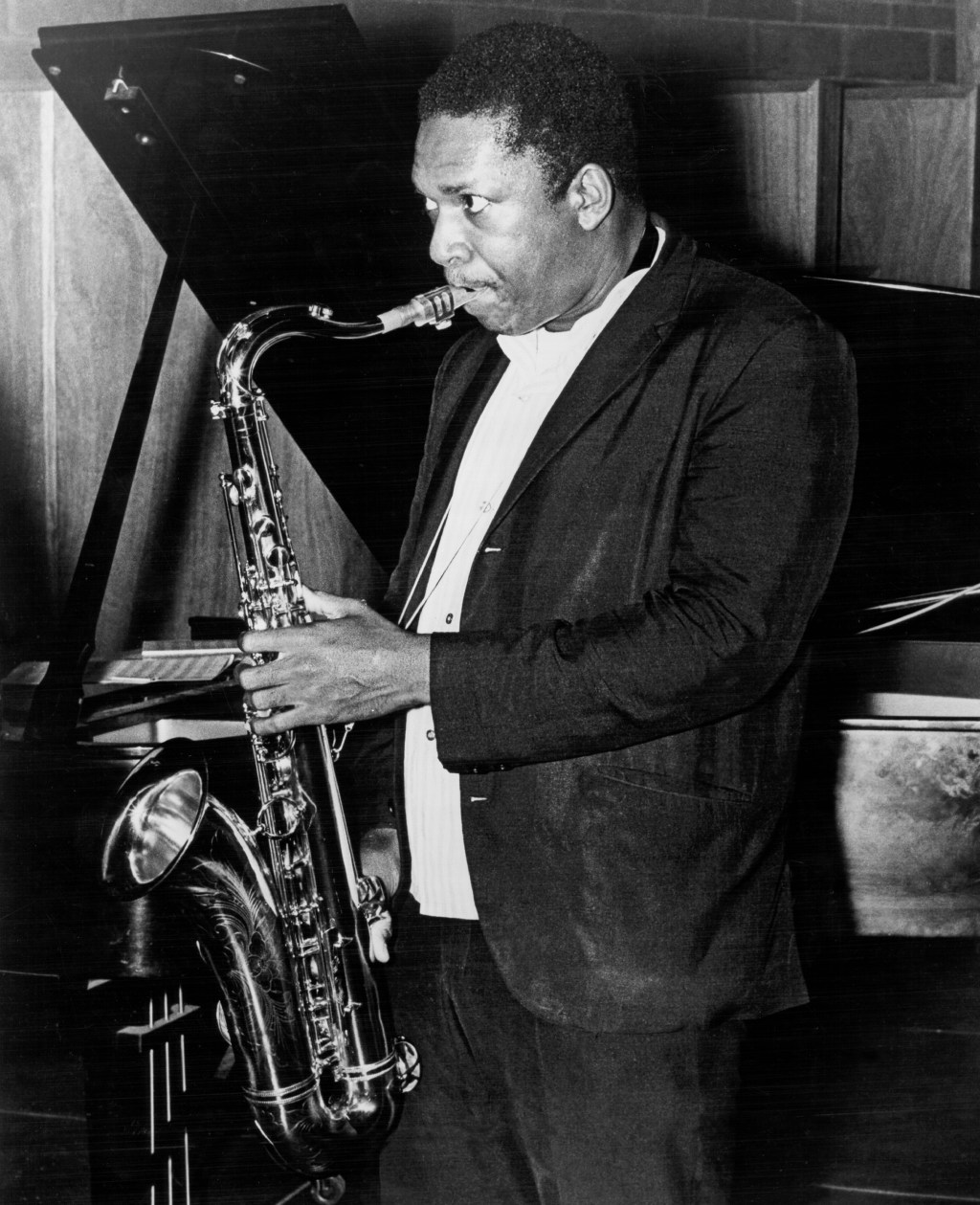
John Coltrane playing saxophone

In 1974, (Note: Though KQED says that the year was 1974, Boulware relays in the Dallas Observer that Franzo King recalled the year as "around 1972".) the Kings attended a concert in Berkeley by John Coltrane's widow, musician Alice Coltrane. She became their guru and they worshiped her as the wife of their god. The church joined Alice's "Vedantic Center" organization and became more focused on the Hindu practices favored by Alice, with members taking Hindu names and singing in Sanskrit on Alice's recordings. In the subsequent several years, the Kings decided to separate from Alice and return to Christian practices. In 1981, Alice sued the church for $7.5 million over its unauthorized use of her husband's name and likeness.

Alice Coltrane dropped the lawsuit, but it attracted the attention of the head of the African Orthodox Church, George Duncan Hinkson, who invited the church to join on the condition that John Coltrane be portrayed as a saint and not a god. In 1982, the church joined the African Orthodox Church. Franzo King took the title "Archbishop", and Marina King took the title "Supreme Mother Reverend".

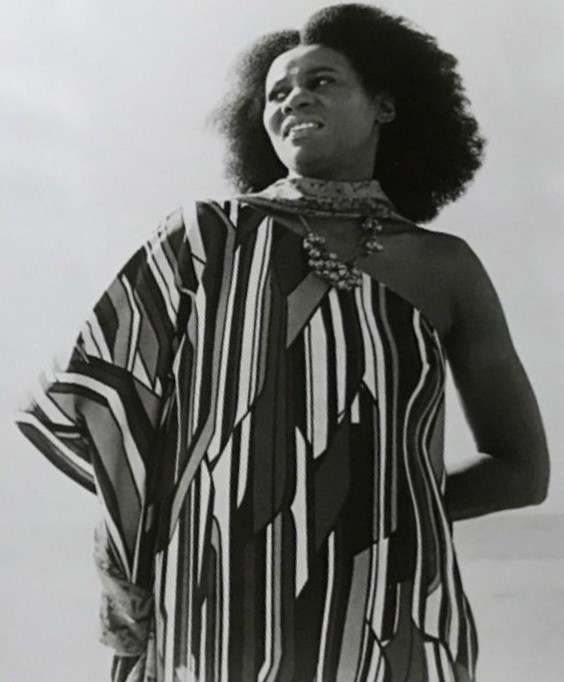
Alice Coltrane in 1972

In 2000, rising rent caused the church to leave their storefront on Divisadero Street, and they ended their free meals program. The church occupied many locations in the following years, including in the Fillmore District and Western Addition neighborhoods. As of 2026, they hold services at the "Magic Theater" venue at Fort Mason in San Francisco.

San Francisco mayor Willie Brown proclaimed July 20, 2001, to be "John Coltrane Day" in San Francisco, in recognition of the church. During her subsequent term as mayor, London Breed also proclaimed July 20, 2023, to be "John Coltrane Day".

== Beliefs ==
In creating the church, Franzo and Marina King believed that John Coltrane was an incarnation of the Christian god and that his album A Love Supreme was a sacred text. Their belief was based on both the sonic qualities of Coltrane's recordings and the religious content of the liner notes and Coltrane's interviews. They also believe that saxophonist Charlie Parker played a role in preparing the world for John Coltrane, comparing him to how John the Baptist was the forerunner of Jesus.

Coltrane spoke often of his spiritual interests and included explicit spiritual material in the liner notes of A Love Supreme. In particular, the Kings believed that the first three parts of the album, "Acknowledgment", "Resolution", and "Pursuance", represented the Christian concepts of the Father, Son, and Holy Spirit. The Kings refer to their core belief as "Coltrane Consciousness". In 2026, Franzo King told KQED:

Coltrane Consciousness is acknowledging that the music and the sound of John Coltrane is that anointed sound that leaped down from the throne of heaven. We want everybody to become aware of the power of this music, of this man, that testimony.

During the first years of the existence of the church, it incorporated practices from multiple religions, including Hinduism and the Sufi Muslim teachings of Inayat Khan. But as of 2026, the church's beliefs more closely match the Pentecostalism with which Franzo King grew up. Whereas John Coltrane was originally considered the god of the church, after it joined the African Orthodox Church in 1982, he has been considered a saint.

Inside the church

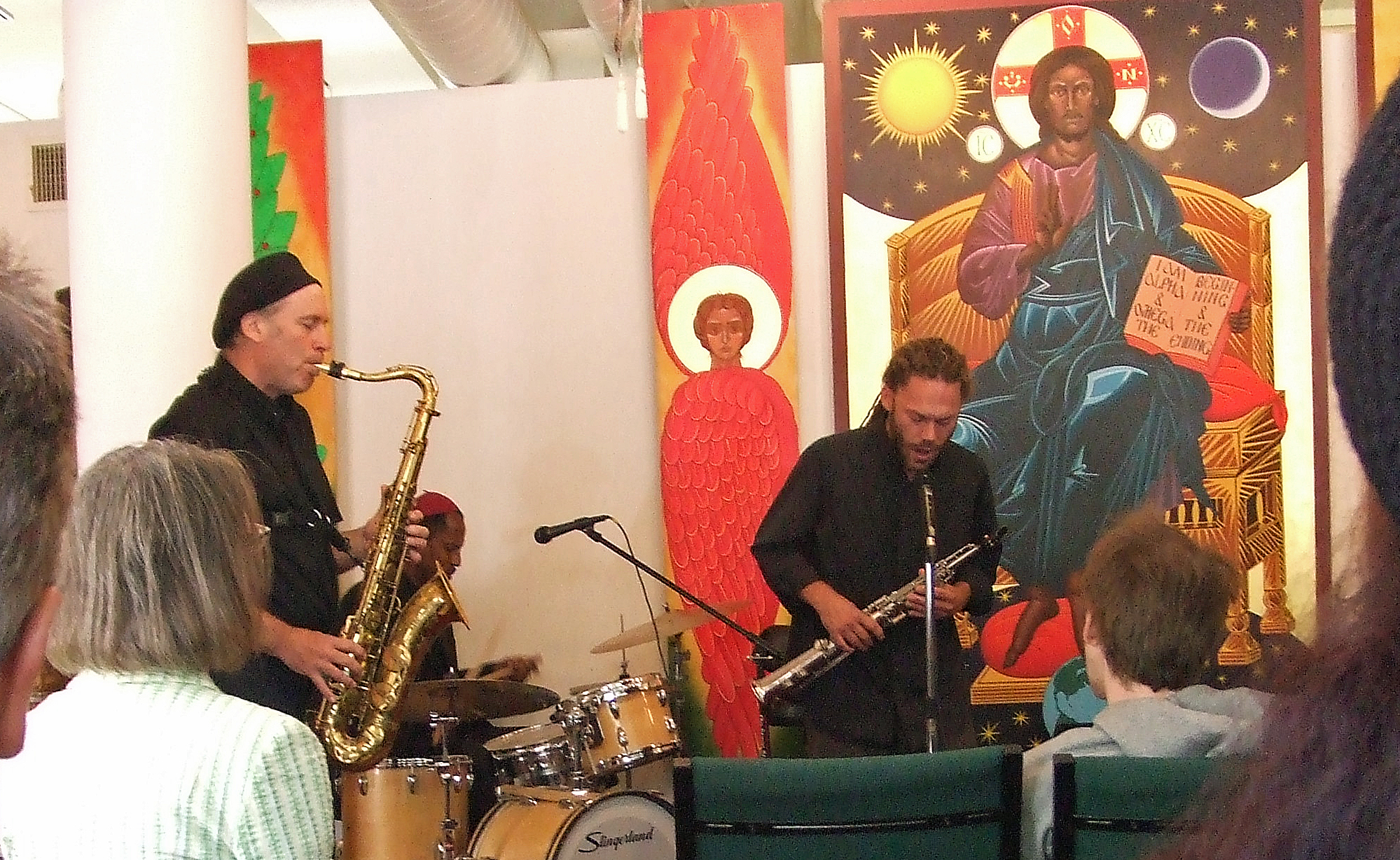
Musicians playing during a service

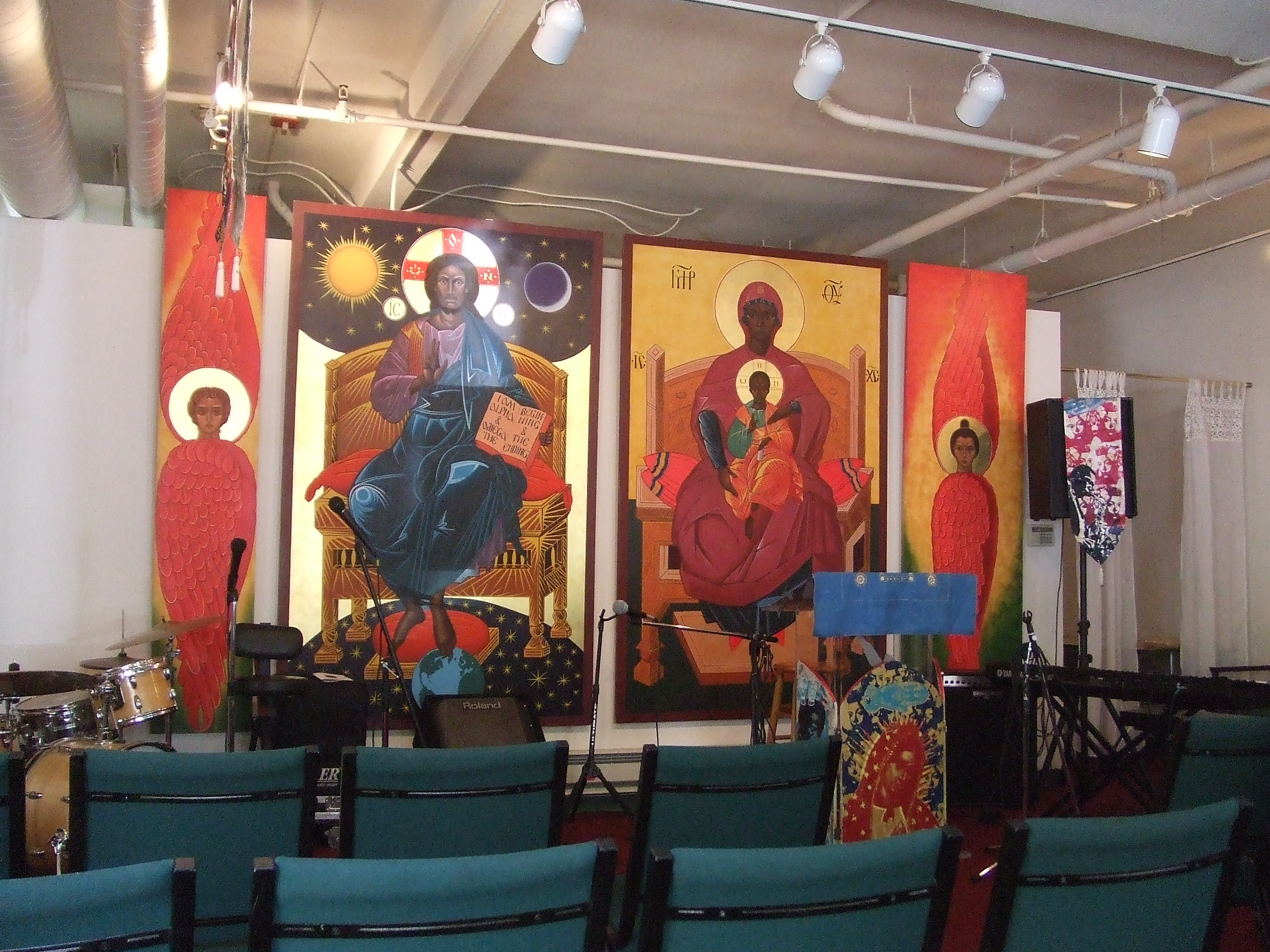
Art and instruments in the church

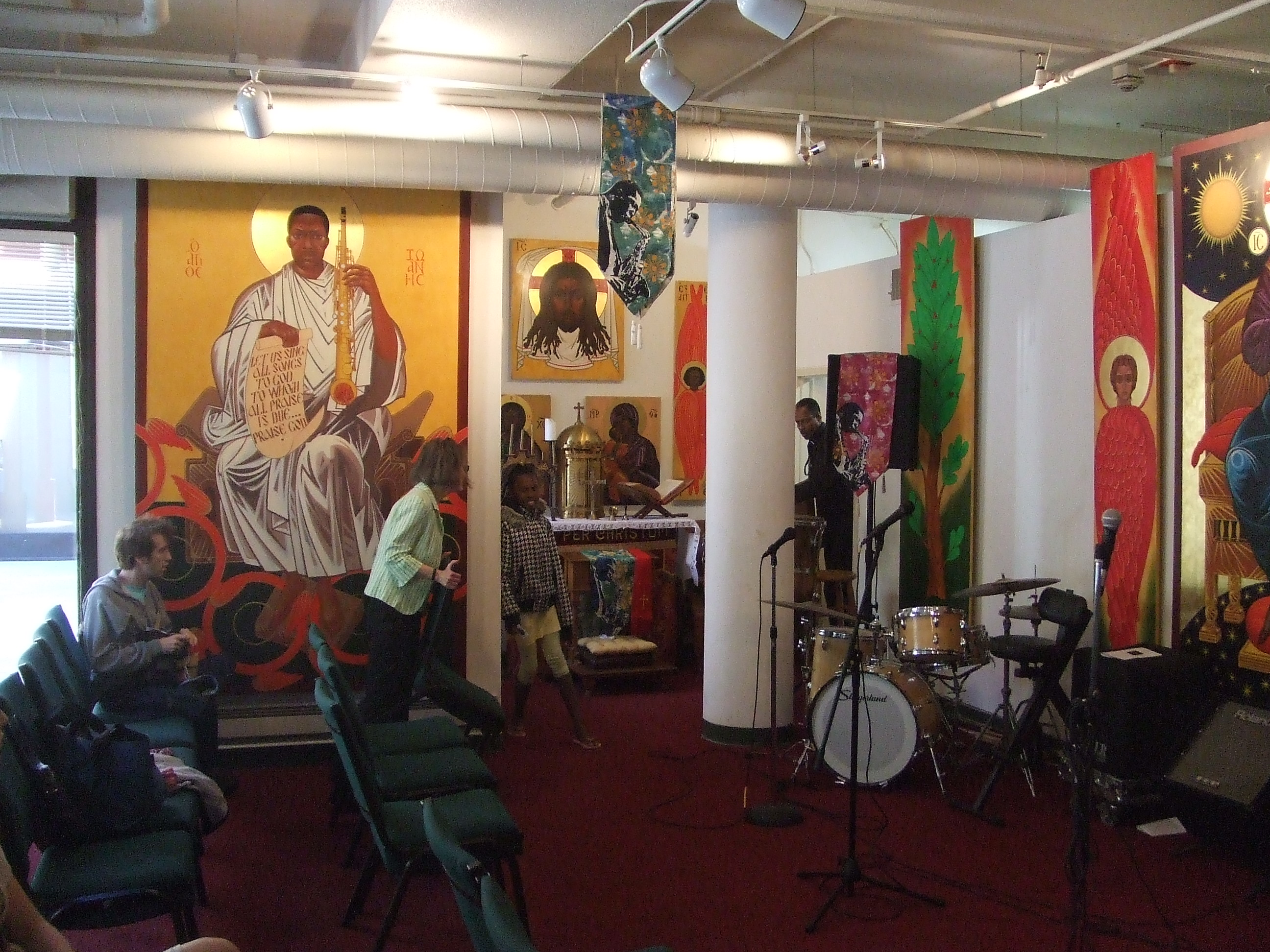
Art depicting John Coltrane

== Activities ==
The church conducts weekly services open to the public, which include a mix of jazz improvisation and traditional Christian liturgy and sermons. Services are opened with a blow from a conch shell, and take place amongst artwork by Mark Dukes depicting John Coltrane in religious poses. Franzo King plays saxophone amongst several other musicians on other instruments. They also host monthly guided jazz meditations. The Kings' adult children hold positions at the church, and their daughter, Wanika Stephens, hosts the weekly jazz program "Uplift" on KPOO.
