= Samuel David Ferguson =

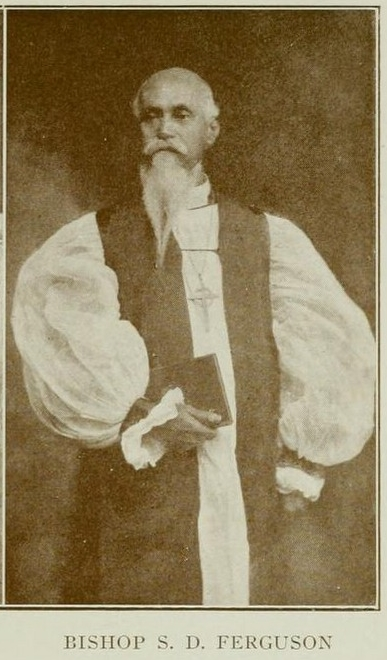
The Rt. Rev. Samuel D. Ferguson, D.D., D.C.L., Fourth Bishop of Liberia, 1885–1916. (c. 1908)

Samuel David Ferguson (January 1, 1842 – August 2, 1916) was an African American clergyman in Liberia. He was the first African American to be elected as a bishop of the Episcopal Diocese of Liberia.

== Biography ==
Samuel David Ferguson was born in Charleston, South Carolina, on January 1, 1842.

He moved with his family to Liberia when he was six years old. He was ordained a deacon on December 28, 1865, and a priest on March 15, 1868. He was consecrated as bishop on June 24, 1885, (Saint John the Baptist's Feast Day) at Grace Church, New York, becoming the first member of the House of Bishops of African descent. He married Mary Leonora Montgomery.

As Missionary Bishop of Liberia, he founded what is now Cuttington University. Ferguson also established the Bromley Mission School. One of his protégés, Raphael Morgan, became an Episcopal priest in the United States but ultimately converted to the Russian Orthodox Church.

Ferguson remained in Liberia until his death in Monrovia in 1916.

== Bibliography ==
- The American Church in West Africa (1909)
