= African Orthodox Church =

American Christian denomination

- Classification: Christian
- Orientation: Black church
- Scripture: Bible
- Theology: Nicene Trinitarianism
- Polity: Episcopal
- Liturgy: Eastern and Western
- Founder: George Alexander McGuire and Marcus M. Garvey

The African Orthodox Church (AOC) was a predominantly African-American Christian denomination which was founded in the United States in 1918 by the joint collaboration of its first patriarch, George Alexander McGuire, and Marcus M. Garvey. As of the late 20th century, the African Orthodox Church was a name used by several Christian denominations.

The AOC has historically held to the historic three-fold ministry of bishops, priests, and deacons, and lays strong emphasis on apostolic succession. The church and its successors celebrate the seven sacraments like the Roman Catholic Church. Its worship is liturgical, of Eastern and Western rites. The Nicene, Apostles', and Athanasian creeds are affirmed.

== History ==
The African Orthodox Church was founded on the belief that black Episcopalians should have a denomination of their own. Episcopal rector George Alexander McGuire was consecrated a bishop on September 28, 1921, who had served as Chaplain-General of the Universal Negro Improvement Association (U. N. I. A.), in Chicago, Illinois, by an episcopus vagans, Archbishop Joseph Rene Vilatte, assisted by Bishop Carl A. Nybladh who had been consecrated by Vilatte. This placed Bishop McGuire in apostolic succession, which was something he had greatly desired.

The United States Census Bureau's Religious Bodies, 1926 edition, first reported one denomination "which now has a thriving organization of congregations" derived from Vilatte, that "aspires to ultimate association with Eastern Orthodox Churches as a racial or national unit" and "does not desire any association with Old Catholic Churches"—the AOC. It had its episcopal see in New York City but incorporated in Florida. It claimed 13 organizations, with a membership of 1,508 without a church edifice. There was no organization reporting a parsonage. The number of ministers identified with the church was 30.

The African Orthodox Church of New York (AOCoNY) was another denomination first reported in 1926 within Religious Bodies. It was incorporated in New York state) and also had its episcopal see in New York City. The AOCoNY was in a fellowship "strictly one of spiritual communion" with the AOC and a distinct organization with "absolute independence." It claimed three organizations, with a membership of 717 with one church edifice. There was one organization reporting a parsonage. The number of ministers identified with the church was not reported.

The African Orthodox Church originally attracted mostly Anglican West Indian immigrants. It spread to the South in 1925 when McGuire started a parish in West Palm Beach, Florida. Two years later he consecrated an African, Daniel William Alexander, as Primate of the Province of South Africa and central and southern Africa. At this time McGuire was elected as patriarch with the title of Alexander I. The church then spread to British Uganda and British Kenya, where it grew to about 10,000. A congregation also developed in Nassau, Bahamas.

In 1932 a bishop of the church went to Uganda and ordained Ruben Spartus Mukasa and one of his associates there priests of the African Orthodox Church. However, a few years later, Mukasa and his followers decided to align with the Greek Orthodox Church of Alexandria. Mukasa went to Alexandria and was ordained by the patriarch there, while the African Orthodox Church lost its connection in Uganda.

The St. John Coltrane African Orthodox Church in San Francisco was founded in 1969 and joined the AOC in 1982.

== Relationship to the Syriac Orthodox Church ==
A notice from the Syriac Patriarchate of Antioch and All the East—Ignatius Aphrem I—concerning schismatic bodies and episcopi vagantes, dated December 10, 1938, states that "after direct expulsion from official Christian communities" some schismatic bodies exist, including "all the sects claiming succession through Vilatte", that claim "without truth to derive their origin and apostolic succession from some ancient Apostolic Church of the East" and

[...] some of these schismatic bodies have with effrontery published statements which are untrue as to an alleged relation "in succession and ordination" to our Holy Apostolic Church and her forefathers, We find it necessary to announce to all whom it may concern that we deny any and every relation whatsoever with these schismatic bodies and repudiate them and their claims absolutely. Furthermore, our Church forbids any and every relationship, and above all, intercommunion with all and any of these schismatic sects and warns the public that their statements and pretensions [...] are altogether without truth.

The notice named the AOC specifically as an example of such schismatic bodies.

In a letter dated to 1987, however, Athanasius Paulose II of the Evangelistic Association of the East, stated the following regarding the consecration of Vilatte:

I have your kind letter of 02-06-1987. Regarding your doubt about the consecration of Mar Joseph Rene Vilatte of U.S.A., I referred six books and confirm that what you have said about Mar Julius is correct. Mar Joseph Rene Vilatte of U.S.A. was consecrated at Colombe of Ceylone in 1892 by Mar Paulose Athanasius, Mar Julius, and Mar Geevarghese Gregoriose as authorized by H.H. The Patriarch of Antioch. Mar Julius was a duly consecrated Bishop. This is the position of our Syrian Orthodox Church.

Vilatte was also recognized as having been made a bishop through the Syriac Orthodox historic episcopate, as Ignatius Peter IV excommunicated him for violating Oriental Orthodox canon law.

== See also ==
- Evangelical Orthodox Church – American Christian denomination, 1979–
- Harlem Renaissance – 1920s African-American cultural movement
- Raphael Morgan – Jamaican-American priest (c. 1866–1922)

== Works cited ==
- Alexander, D. W. Constitution and Canons and Episcopate of the African Orthodox Church Beaconsfield 1942
- Arthur C. Thompson's The History of the African Orthodox Church (1956)
- Byron Rushing's A Note on the Origin of the African Orthodox Church (JNH, Jan. 1972)
- Gavin White. "Patriarch McGuire and the Episcopal Church" in Historical Magazine of the Protestant Episcopal Church. No. 38. — 1969. — P. 109—141.
