= Raphael Morgan =

Jamaican-American priest (c. 1866–1922)

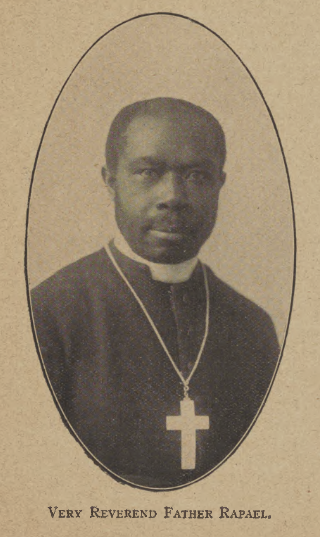
From The African times and Orient review, February 1913 issue.

Robert Josias "Raphael" Morgan (c. 1866 - July 29, 1922) was a Jamaican-American who is believed to be the first Black Eastern Orthodox priest in the United States. After being active in other denominations, including the AME Church, Church of England, and the Episcopal Church, Morgan converted to Orthodoxy. He was ordained as an Eastern Orthodox priest of the Ecumenical Patriarchate. He was designated as "Missionary (Greek: Ιεραποστολος) to America and the West Indies." He claimed to have founded the "Order of Golgotha", but the Orthodox Church is not organized into orders.

As a young man he had traveled in the Caribbean and to the United States, where he became a minister in the AME Church, the first independent black denomination in the US. He next traveled to England, and joined the Church of England and began religious studies. He returned to the US, where he was ordained in 1895 after a period as a deacon in the Episcopal Church. He continued studies and worked in several parishes in the US.

Morgan never became fluent in Greek, the traditional language of the Eastern Orthodox Church; he conducted his services mostly in English. Since his life was rediscovered in the late 20th century, he has been the subject of study. But much of his life is not well documented and remains a mystery. According to a 1915 short biography, Morgan had resided all over the world, including: "Palestine, Syria, Joppa, Greece, Cyprus, Mytilene, Chios, Sicily, Crete, Egypt, Russia, Ottoman Turkey, Austria, Germany, England, France, Scandinavia, Belgium, Holland, Italy, Switzerland, Bermuda, and the United States".

== Early life ==
Robert Josias Morgan was born in Chapelton, Clarendon Parish, Jamaica, either in the late 1860s or early 1870s to Robert Josias and Mary Ann (née Johnson) Morgan. He was born six months after his father's death and named in his honour. He was raised in the Anglican tradition and received elementary schooling locally.

In his teenage years Morgan travelled to Colón, Panama, then to British Honduras, back to Jamaica, and then to the United States. There he became a minister in the African Methodist Episcopal Church (AME), the first independent black denomination in the United States. He traveled to Germany as a missionary.

=== Church of England ===
Morgan went to England, where he joined the established Church of England. He was sent to the colony of Sierra Leone to serve at the Church Missionary Society Grammar School at Freetown. There he studied Greek, Latin, and other higher-level subjects. Morgan also worked in a paid position as second master at a public school at Freetown. He took courses in the Church Missionary Society College at Fourah Bay in Freetown.

The colony was established in the late eighteenth century as a place for resettlement of the "Black Poor of London" (many of them Black Loyalists of the British colonies, African-American slaves who had been freed by the British during the American Revolutionary War). They were joined by Black Loyalists who voluntarily resettled in Freetown after having first been taken to Nova Scotia, as well as by Jamaican Maroons, and Africans liberated from slave ships by the British navy in the years after the abolition of the Atlantic slave trade.

Morgan was next appointed as a missionary teacher and lay-reader by Samuel David Ferguson, the Episcopal Bishop of Liberia, a country adjacent to Sierra Leone. Morgan later said, during a trip to Jamaica in 1901, that he had served five years in West Africa, three years of this time in missionary work. Liberia had been set up as a colony for the resettlement of free blacks from the United States, and was supported by the American Colonization Society before the American Civil War.

After Morgan returned to England for private study, he travelled to the United States to work as a lay reader in the African-American community. He was accepted as a Postulant and as candidate for the Episcopal deaconate in the Episcopal Church (United States). During the canonical waiting period before ordination, Morgan again returned to England. He was said to have studied at Saint Aidan's Theological College in Birkenhead, and completed his studies at King's College at the University of London, although the colleges do not have records of his attendance. (Note: It is possible that he academically audited the courses, attending the classes without receiving a formal grade.)

=== Episcopal Church (United States) ===
After Morgan returned to the United States, he was ordained as deacon on June 20, 1895, (Note: Fr. Raphael's name appears on a list of Black Episcopal ordinations as follows: "1895: Robert Josias Morgan, d. June 20, Coleman; deposed; went abroad and was made a priest in Greek Church." (Bragg, The Rev. George F. (D.D.). Chapter XXXVI: "Negro Ordinations from 1866 to the Present". In: History of the Afro-American group of the Episcopal church (1922). Baltimore, Md.: Church Advocate Press, 1922, p. 273.)) by the Rt. Rev. Leighton Coleman, bishop of the Episcopal Diocese of Delaware, and a well-known opponent of racism. Morgan was appointed honorary curator at St Matthew's Church in Wilmington, Delaware, serving there from 1896 to 1897. He also taught in public schools in Delaware. From 1897 he served the Episcopal Church in Charleston, West Virginia.

In 1898, Morgan was transferred to the Missionary Jurisdiction of Asheville, North Carolina (now in the Diocese of Western North Carolina). By 1899 he was listed as being assistant minister at St. Stephen's Chapel in Morganton, North Carolina and St. Cyprian's Church in Lincolnton, North Carolina. (Note: St. Cyprian's Episcopal Church was established in 1886. The church once stood on West Church in Lincolnton. The property consisted of a church, a parsonage, and a building used as a school. The church was torn down during the 1970s. It remained primarily black and was not integrated until 1979. (Jason L. Harpe, Lincoln County Revisited. Illustrated. Arcadia Publishing, 2003, p. 18))

In 1901-1902 Morgan visited his homeland, Jamaica. In October 1901 he gave an address to the Jamaica Church Missionary Union on West Africa and mission work. He also gave a lecture in Port Maria in October 1902, entitled "Africa – Its People, Tribes, Idolatry, Customs".

Between 1900 and 1906, Morgan moved around much of the Eastern seaboard in the US. From 1902 to 1905 he served at Richmond, Virginia, in 1905 at Nashville, Tennessee, and by 1906 at Philadelphia, Pennsylvania. His address was in care of the Church of the Crucifixion. (Note: The Church of the Crucifixion is the second-oldest African-American congregation in Pennsylvania after the African Episcopal Church of St. Thomas, the oldest Black Episcopal congregation in the country. It is the sixth oldest in the country, and in 1847 was the first Black parish formally admitted into union with Convention. A major Black cultural center in the late 19th and early 20th century, the Church of the Crucifixion was significant to African-American history in Philadelphia and the US.)

At some point during this period, Morgan joined the American Catholic Church (ACC), a sect of the Episcopal Church founded by Joseph René Vilatte, a former Roman Catholic. (Note: The American Catholic Church (ACC) included the jurisdictions and groups which developed from Joseph René Vilatte's Episcopal ministry or were under his oversight. Among them were French and English-speaking constituencies, and Polish and Italian ordinariates. The ACC began on August 20, 1894, at a synod held in Cleveland, Ohio. There Polish-speaking parishes joined the jurisdiction of Bishop Vilatte; however, the ACC was not formally incorporated until July 1915.) Morgan was listed in the records of the Episcopal Church (United States) as late as 1908, when he was suspended from ministry the result of allegations of abandoning his post.

== Orthodoxy ==
=== Trip to Russia ===
By the turn of the 20th century, Morgan began to question his faith, and he began intensive study of Anglicanism, Catholicism, and Eastern Orthodoxy over a three-year period. He was in search of what he called the true religion. He concluded that the Eastern Orthodox Church was "the pillar and ground of truth", resigned from the Episcopal Church, and embarked on an extensive trip abroad beginning in 1904 in the Russian Empire.

Once there, Morgan visited various monasteries and churches, including sites in Odessa, St. Petersburg, Moscow and Kiev. As a black American, he attracted attention. Sundry periodicals began publishing pictures and articles on him, and soon Morgan became a special guest of the Tsar. He was allowed to be present for the anniversary celebrations of Nicholas II's coronation, and the memorial service said for the repose of the soul of the late Emperor Alexander III.

Leaving Russia, Morgan traveled the Ottoman Empire, Cyprus, and the Holy Land. After he returned to the US, he published an open letter in the Russian-American Orthodox Messenger (Vestnik) in 1904 about his experiences in Russia. He expressed hope that the Episcopal Church could unite with the Orthodox Churches. Morgan continued his spiritual quest.

=== Study and trip to Ecumenical Patriarchate ===
For another three years, Morgan studied under Greek priests in the United States for his baptism, eventually deciding to seek entry and ordination in the Greek Orthodox Church. In January 1906, he is documented as "assisting" in the Christmas liturgy. (Note: The Philadelphia Inquirer reported on January 8, 1906, that "Rev. R. J. Morgan of the American Catholic Church, an off-shoot of the Protestant Episcopal Church, assisted.") In 1907 the Greek community in Philadelphia referred Morgan to the Ecumenical Patriarchate in Constantinople, along with two letters of support. Fr. Demetrios Petrides, the Greek priest serving the Philadelphia community, described Morgan as a man sincerely coming to Orthodoxy after long and diligent study, and recommended his baptism and ordination into the priesthood. The second letter was from the Ecclesiastical Committee of the Philadelphia Greek Orthodox Church, saying that Morgan could serve as an assistant priest if he failed to form a separate Orthodox parish among Black Americans.

In Constantinople, Morgan was interviewed by Metropolitan Joachim (Phoropoulos) of Pelagonia, one of the few bishops of the Ecumenical Patriarchate who could speak English. Metropolitan Joachim examined Morgan noting that he had a "deep knowledge of the teachings of the Orthodox Church" and that he also had a certificate from the president of the Methodist Community, duly notarized, stating that he was a man "of high calling and of a religious life". He agreed to his baptism.

=== Baptism and ordination ===
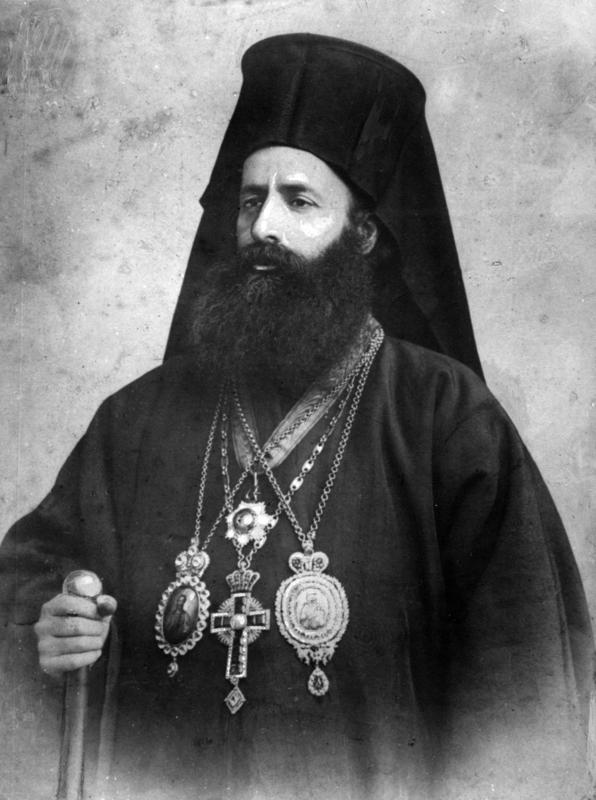
Metr. Joachim (Phoropoulos) of Pelagonia, Fr. Raphael's ordaining bishop

On August 2, 1907, the Holy Synod approved that the baptism take place the following Sunday in the Church of the Life-giving Source at the Patriarchal Monastery at Balıklı, in Constantinople. (Note: The Patriarchal Monastery at Balıklı is where the cemetery with the graves of the Patriarchs is found.) Metropolitan Joachim (Phoropoulos) of Pelagonia was to officiate at the sacrament, and the sponsor was to be Bishop Leontios (Liverios) of Theodoroupolis, Abbot of the Monastery at Balıklı. On Sunday August 4, 1907, Robert was baptised "Raphael" before 3000 people; subsequently he was ordained a deacon on August 12, 1907, by Metropolitan Joachim; and finally ordained a priest on the feast of the Dormition of the Theotokos, August 15, 1907. (Note: In a letter from the Chief Archivist of the Ecumenical Patriarchate, dated April 4, 1973, it was confirmed that the records of the Patriarchate show that Morgan was baptised and renamed "Raphael". (Manolis, Paul G. "Raphael (Robert) Morgan: The First Black Orthodox Priest in America". Theologia: Epistēmonikon Periodikon Ekdidomenon Kata Trimēnian. (En Athenais: Vraveion Akadēmias Athēnōn), 1981, vol.52, no.3, pp.467.)) According to the contemporary Uniate periodical L'Echo d' Orient, which sarcastically described Morgan's baptism as triple immersion, the Metropolitan conducted the sacraments of Baptism and Ordination in English, following which Fr. Raphael chanted the Divine Liturgy in English. With Fr. Raphael Morgan's ordination in the Greek Orthodox Church he became the first African-American Orthodox priest.

Fr. Raphael was sent back to the US with vestments, a cross, and 20 pounds sterling for his traveling expenses. He was allowed to hear confessions, but denied Holy Chrism and an antimension, presumably to attach his missionary ministry to the Philadelphia church. The minutes of the Holy Synod from October 2, 1907, made it clear that Fr. Raphael was to be under the jurisdiction of Rev. Petrides of Philadelphia. After he was thoroughly trained in liturgics and was able to establish a separate Orthodox parish, he could gain independence.

=== Return to America ===
Recorded as Raffaele Morgan at Ellis Island, he landed in New York in December 1907. Fr. Raphael baptized his wife and children in the Orthodox Church.

The last mention of Fr. Raphael in Patriarchal records is in the minutes of the Holy Synod of November 4, 1908, which cite a letter from him recommending an Anglican priest of Philadelphia, named "A.C.V. Cartier", (Note: A. C. V. Cartier, an African American, was ordained to the Episcopal deaconate by Bishop Charles Quintard in 1895, and ordained to the Episcopal priesthood in the same year by Bishop Quintard. (Bragg, Rev. George F. (D.D.). Chapter XXXVI: "Negro Ordinations from 1866 to the Present". In: History of the Afro-American group of the Episcopal church. Baltimore, Md.: Church Advocate Press, 1922, p. 273.)) as a candidate for conversion to Orthodoxy and ordination as a priest. Cartier was rector of the African Episcopal Church of St. Thomas, in Philadelphia, from 1906 to 1912. The church served the African-American elite of Philadelphia and was one of the most prestigious congregations in African-American Christianity. It was started in 1794 by Absalom Jones, who had been an early leader with Richard Allen of the Free African Union. This preceded Allen's founding of the African Methodist Episcopal Church.

In 1909, Charlotte Morgan filed for divorce alleging physical and verbal abuse, infidelity and failure to support their children, with the accusations of abuse and neglect corroborated by a witness. Both gave graphic testimony to the court. In a deposition, Fr. Raphael denied any wrongdoing and counter-accused his wife of abuse toward him, but he did not appear at the divorce hearing. The divorce was granted by the court in 1910.

Fr. Raphael retained custody of their 13-year-old daughter, Roberta Viola Morgan. (Note: Through research in the travel and immigration records of the website Ancestry.com, researcher Matthew Namee uncovered an Emergency Passport Application for Roberta Viola Morgan dated April 5, 1924, revealing that she had been living in Greece from 1912 to 1924 (roughly ages 15–27). Roberta had said that her father was "Rafael Morgan", and that he was deceased, having died "between 1916 and 1924".) Their 9-year-old son Cyril Ignatius lived with his mother in Delaware County, where she remarried. (Note: The April 6, 1933 issue of the Philadelphia Tribune reported that "Rev. Cyril Morgan of New York was the weekend guest of his mother, Mrs. Charlotte Baylis[s]".)

=== Monastic tonsure ===
In 1911 Morgan sailed to Cyprus, presumably to be tonsured a hieromonk. (But, Fr. Oliver Herbel (OCA) has suggested that in 1911 Morgan was tonsured in Athens.)

Possibly at this time, he claimed to have founded what he called the Order of the Cross of Golgotha (O.C.G.). (Note: According to Fr. Raphael's biography in the Who's Who of the Colored Race, 1915, after he was ordained to the priesthood: "...at a special service he was duly commissioned Priest-Apostolic from the Ecumenical and Patriarchal Throne of Constantinople to America and the West Indies." (Mather, Frank Lincoln. Who's Who of the Colored Race: A General Biographical Dictionary of Men and Women of African Descent. University of Michigan. Gale Research Co., 1915, p. 226.)) (Note: The "Order of...", could refer to any number of things, including: 1. an honorarium bestowed upon him for service done in the Church; 2. an entitling which lets others know of his special mission in the Patriarchate/Diocese etc.; 3. a Society of monastics which transcends, because of rare circumstances, physical location; 4. a monastic brotherhood formed for Black Orthodox Christians, since Morgan was referred to as the "founder and superior" of that "religious fraternity" (in Who's Who of the Colored Race); however, the formation of formal monastic orders is not traditionally practiced in the Orthodox tradition. The Eastern Orthodox Church does not have separate orders (Franciscan, Carmelite etc.) each with an entirely independent rule or ethos of life. Despite the Order being mentioned on many occasions in association with Morgan, no other material has ever been found on the Order of the Cross of Golgotha.) As noted above, the Archives of the Church of Greece contain no information about Morgan.

=== Lecture tour in Jamaica ===
According to an April 1913 article in the Jamaica Times, Fr. Raphael was headquartered at Philadelphia where he wanted to build a chapel for his missionary efforts. It reported that he had recently visited Europe to collect funds to this end, and had the intention of extending his work to the West Indies.

Near the end of 1913, Fr. Raphael visited his homeland of Jamaica, staying for several months. While there, he met a group of Syrians, who were complaining of a lack of Orthodox churches on the island. Fr. Raphael did his best to contact the Syrian-American diocese of the Russian church, writing to St. Raphael of Brooklyn. As most descendants of the Syrians in Jamaica are now communicants in the Episcopal Church, the Russian Orthodox Church may have established a mission here; this presumably came to no avail. In December, a Russian warship came to port, and he co-celebrated the Divine Liturgy with the sailors, their chaplain, and his new-found Syrians.

Morgan chiefly conducted a lecture circuit that he ran throughout Jamaica. Given the lack of Orthodox churches, Fr. Raphael gave his talks at churches of other denomination. He discussed his travels, the Holy Land, and Holy Orthodoxy. At some point, he returned to Chapelton, where he told attendees regarding his name change, "I will always be Robert to you".

According to the Daily Gleaner edition of November 2, 1914, Fr. Raphael had just set sail for America to start mission work under his Faith. (Note: "Father Raphael, Priest of the Greek Orthodox Church, who has been in the island for some time, sailed for America last week. It is understood that he will return shortly to his native land and start mission work under his Faith. As is well known, the seat of the Greek Church to which father Raphael belongs is not far from the theatre of war, so there is no hope of the Father returning to his Mother Church in a hurry. Father Raphael is a native of Clarendon." (The Daily Gleaner, November 2, 1914, p. 13))

=== Last known records ===
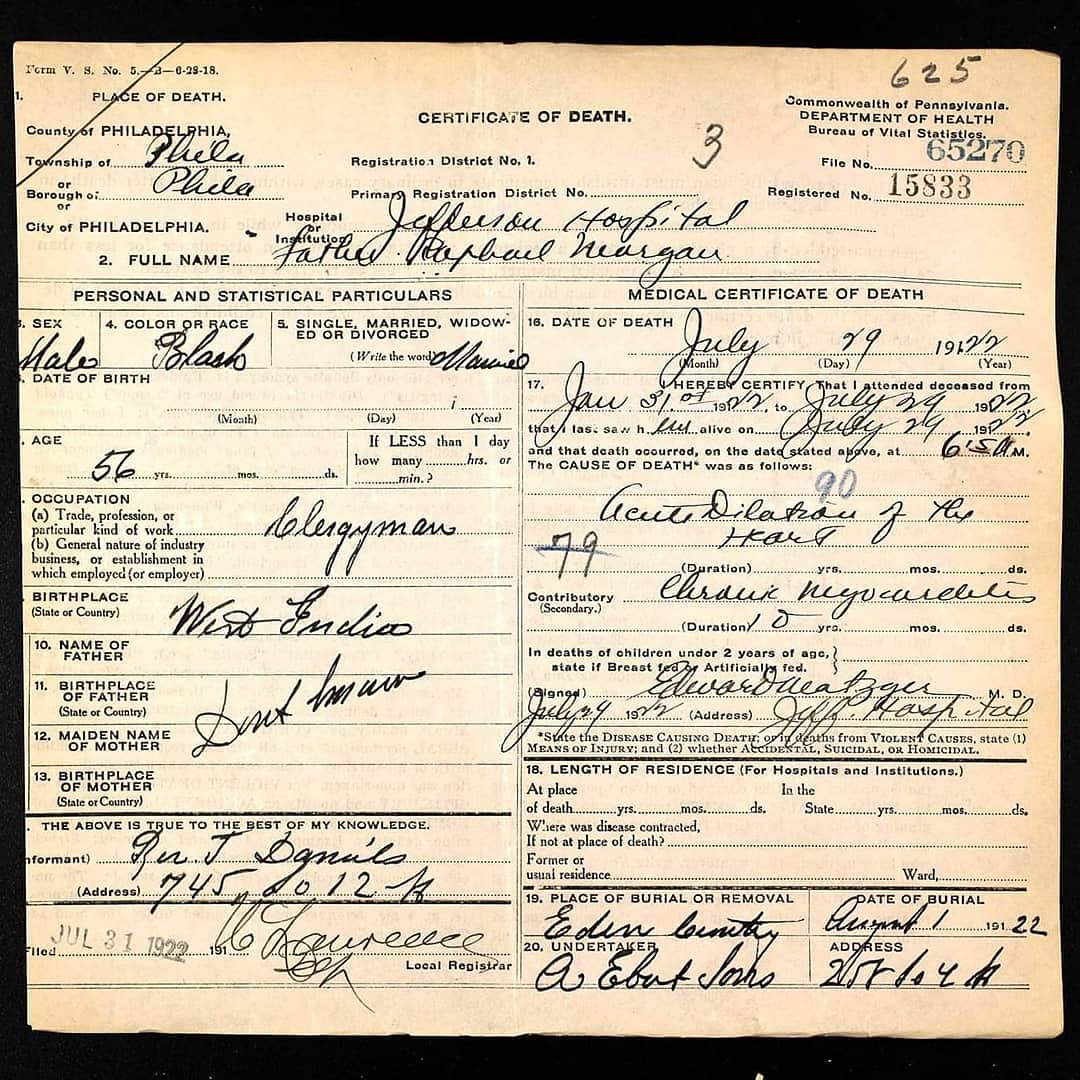
Certificate of Death

According to a 1915 short biography, Morgan had resided all over the world, including: "in Palestine, Syria, Joppa, Greece, Cyprus, Mytilene, Chios, Sicily, Crete, Egypt, Russia, Ottoman Turkey, Austria, Germany, England, France, Scandinavia, Belgium, Holland, Italy, Switzerland, Bermuda, and the United States."

In 1916 Fr. Raphael was still in Philadelphia, having made the Philadelphia Greek parish his base of operations. The last documentation of Fr. Raphael comes from a letter to the Daily Gleaner on October 4, 1916. Representing a group of about a dozen Jamaican-Americans, he wrote to protest the lectures of Black Nationalist Marcus Garvey. (Note: Signatories included: Dr. Uriah Smith, Ernest P. Duncan, Ernest R. Jones, H. S. Boulin, Phillip Hemmings, Joseph Vassal, Henry H. Harper, S. C. Box, Aldred Campbell, Hubert Barclay, John Moore, Victor Monroe, Henry Booth, and others. The full text of the signed letter is printed in: Robert A. Hill, Marcus Garvey, Universal Negro Improvement Association. "Letter Denouncing Marcus Garvey." In: The Marcus Garvey and Universal Negro Improvement Association Papers: 1826 – August 1919. University of California Press, 1983, pp.196–197.) They felt Garvey's views damaged the reputation of their homeland and its people. They objected to Garvey saying he preferred the prejudice of American whites to that of English whites. Garvey said that the letter was a conspiratorial fabrication meant to undermine the success and favour he had gained while in Jamaica and in the United States. Little is known of Fr. Raphael's later life. The Greek Orthodox Archdiocese of America has records neither of Fr. Raphael Morgan, nor of Fr. Demetrios Petrides. Records in the archives for this Philadelphia community do not begin until 1918.

As noted, Morgan's daughter said on her passport that her father had died between 1916 and 1924. In the 1970s Greek-American historian Paul G. Manolis interviewed surviving members of the Greek Community of the Annunciation in Philadelphia, who recalled the black priest who had been part of their community. Grammatike Kritikos Sherwin said that Fr. Raphael's daughter left to attend Oxford University. Kyriacos Biniaris said that Morgan spoke broken Greek and served with Fr. Petrides, reciting the liturgy mostly in English. George Liacouras recalled that after serving in Philadelphia for some years, Fr. Raphael left for Jerusalem, never to return.

Fr. Raphael Morgan died on July 29, 1922, aged 56, in Philadelphia and is buried in the Historic Eden Cemetery, 1434 Springfield Road, Collingdale, Pennsylvania, 1902. He was given a pauper's funeral, buried in obscurity, and laid to rest by Pro-Royalist Fr. Thomas Daniels.

== Influence ==
=== "Indirect Conversion of Thousands" theory ===
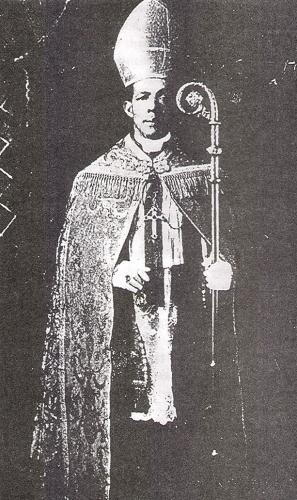
George Alexander McGuire, founder of the African Orthodox Church and its first Primate (1921-1934)

During the 16th Annual Ancient Christianity and African-American Conference in 2009, Matthew Namee presented a 23-minute lecture on the heretofore recently discovered life of Fr. Raphael Morgan. He postulates that even if Fr. Raphael's missionary efforts failed outside of his immediate family, he may be indirectly responsible for the conversion of thousands, via contact with Episcopal priest George Alexander McGuire (1866–1934), the founder of the non-canonical African Orthodox Church in 1921.

Namee questions whence the idea came for McGuire to form namely an Orthodox church. Fr. Raphael Morgan and George McGuire have some striking similarities, including the facts that both:

- served concurrently or consecutively at St Philip's Episcopal Church in Virginia, (Note: St. Philip’s Episcopal Church of Richmond, Virginia lists Morgan as having been the rector of their parish for a short time in 1901. He is listed as the rector from "1901-April 1901". Morgan's predecessor at St. Philip's was a certain "Reverend George Alexander McQuire," who served the parish from April 1898 to November 1900.)
- were ordained in the Episcopal Church around the same time, (Note: Rev. Morgan was ordained to the Episcopal deaconate on June 20, 1895, by Bishop Leighton Coleman. George McGuire was ordained to the Episcopal deaconate on June 29, 1896, by Bishop Boyd Vincent, and to the Episcopal priesthood in 1897 by the same. (Bragg, Rev. George F. (D.D.). Chapter XXXVI: "Negro Ordinations from 1866 to the Present". In: History of the Afro-American group of the Episcopal church (1922). Baltimore, Md.: Church Advocate Press, 1922, p. 273)) and
- both later served in Philadelphia, each having had some contact with Rev. A. C. V. Cartier of the African Episcopal Church of St. Thomas.

Namee concludes that with so many coincidences, it is impossible for these two men to not have known one another; and therefore it must be from some influence — either in conversation with Fr. Raphael or through evangelism — that McGuire received his inspiration and came to know the Orthodox Church.

An additional point is that Garvey also knew of Fr. Raphael Morgan when McGuire joined his organisation in 1920 (i.e. Fr. Raphael's letter of 1916), which makes it likely that McGuire and Garvey had discussed Morgan at some point, both having known of him.

One deterrent from this theory comes in the familiarity that McGuire may have had with the Eastern Orthodox Church through his consecrator, Joseph René Vilatte. (Note: In his quest to obtain valid Apostolic Orders, Fr. McGuire had himself re-ordained Bishop in the American Catholic Church, being consecrated on September 28, 1921, in Chicago, Illinois, by Archbishop Joseph René Vilatte, assisted by bishop Carl A. Nybladh who had been consecrated by Vilatte. However the Eastern Orthodox Church considers Villate to be an Episcopi vagantes.) At various points, Vilatte come into contact with both the Russian and Syriac Orthodox Churches in a move for Catholic-Orthodox reconciliation, having even been accepted for a while by Bishop Vladimir of Alaska in May 1891.

==== Philadelphia ====
Scholar Gavin White, writing in the 1970s, said that if Morgan tried to organise an African-American Greek Orthodox church in Philadelphia, its memory has vanished. He added:

"...there can be no doubt that McGuire knew all about Morgan and it is very probable that he knew him personally. It is just possible that it was Morgan who first introduced McGuire to the Episcopal Church in Wilmington; it was almost certainly Morgan who introduced McGuire to the idea of Eastern episcopacy".

While Fr. Raphael Morgan's work among Jamaicans in Philadelphia appears to have been transitory, he may have inspired the interest of some current African Americans interest in Orthodoxy.

== See also ==
- List of African-American firsts
- List of Eastern Orthodox missionaries
- George Alexander McGuire
- African Orthodox Church
- Joseph René Vilatte
- Albert J. Raboteau
- Religion in Black America

== Sources ==
Contemporary sources

- ATOR (African Times and Orient Review), (February – March 1913), p. 163.
- Bragg, Rev. George F. (D.D.). "Chapter XXXVI: Negro Ordinations from 1866 to the Present". In: History of the Afro-American group of the Episcopal church (1922). Baltimore, Md.: Church Advocate Press, 1922.
- Bragg, Rev. George F. (D.D.). "Afro-American Clergy List. Priests". In: Afro-American Church Work and Workers. Baltimore, Md.: Church Advocate Print, 1904.
- Hill, Robert A., Marcus Garvey, Universal Negro Improvement Association. The Marcus Garvey and Universal Negro Improvement Association Papers: 1826–August 1919. University of California Press, 1983. ISBN 978-0-520-04456-2
- Mather, Frank Lincoln. Who's Who of the Colored Race: A General Biographical Dictionary of Men and Women of African Descent. University of Michigan. Gale Research Co., 1915, pp. 226–227.
- R. J. Morgan. "An Open Letter." Amerikanskiĭ Pravoslavnyĭ Viestnik. October and November Supplement (1904), pp. 380–382.
- The Daily Gleaner. West Africa. October 9, 1901, p. 7.
- "Port Maria: A Lecture", The Daily Gleaner, October 7, 1902, p. 29.
- "Priest's Visit: Father Raphael of Greek Orthodox Church: His Extensive Travels", The Daily Gleaner, July 22, 1913.
- "Gives Lecture. Fr. Raphael Talks of His Travels Abroad", The Daily Gleaner, August 15, 1913.
- The Daily Gleaner. November 2, 1914, p. 13.
- "Only Negro Who is a Greek Priest", The Jamaica Times, 26 April 1913.
- "Une Conquete du Patriarcat Oecumenique". Échos d'Orient, Vol. XI. No. 68, 1908, pp. 55–56.

(Publication of the Roman Catholic Uniate Assumptionist Fathers, located in Chalcedon; for an online translation of the French article, see: Fr. Andrew S. Damick. '"The Sorcerer on the Golden Horn." OrthodoxHistory.org (The Society for Orthodox Christian History in the Americas), December 15, 2009)

- Work, Monroe N. (ed.). The Negro Yearbook, an Annual Encyclopedia of the Negro, 1921–1922. The Negro Year Book Publishing Company: Tuskegee Institute, 1922 (1921 edition, p. 213)

Modern sources

- Herbel, Fr. Oliver (OCA). "Jurisdictional Disunity and the Russian Mission". Orthodox Christians for Accountability. April 22, 2009.
- Herbel, Fr. Oliver (OCA). "Morgan, Raphael". The African American National Biography at mywire.com. 1 January 2008.
- Herbel, Fr. Oliver (OCA). "Turning to Tradition: Intra-Christian Converts and the Making of an American Orthodox Church." Ph.D. Dissertation, under the direction of Michael McClymond (2009). 349 pp.
- Herbel, Fr. Oliver (OCA). "The Relationship of the African Orthodox Church to the Orthodox Churches and Its Importance for Appreciating the Brotherhood of St. Moses the Black," Black Theology. (forthcoming)
- Kourelis, Kostis. "Philadelphia Greeks and Their Black Priest." Objects-Building-Situation: Musings on Architecture, Art and History, with Special Focus on Mediterranean Archaeology. Thursday, October 29, 2009.
- Lumsden, Joy, MA (Cantab), PhD (UWI). Father Raphael.
- Lumsden, Joy. "Robert Josias Morgan, aka Father Raphael". Jamaican History Month 2007. 16 February 2007.
- Manolis, Paul G. "Raphael (Robert) Morgan: The First Black Orthodox Priest in America". Theologia: Epistēmonikon Periodikon Ekdidomenon Kata Trimēnian. (En Athenais: Vraveion Akadēmias Athēnōn), 1981, vol. 52, no. 3, pp. 464–480. ISSN 1105-154X
- Martin, Tony. "McGuire, George Alexander". Encyclopedia of the Harlem Renaissance. Volume 2. Cary D. Wintz, Paul Finkelman (eds). Taylor & Francis, 2004.
- Namee, Matthew. "Fr. Raphael Morgan: America's First Black Orthodox Priest". 16th Annual Ancient Christianity & African-American Conference, June 3, 2009.
- Namee, Matthew. "The First Black Orthodox Priest in America". OrthodoxHistory.org (The Society for Orthodox Christian History in the Americas). July 15, 2009.
- Namee, Matthew. "Robert Josias Morgan visits Russia, 1904". OrthodoxHistory.org (The Society for Orthodox Christian History in the Americas). September 15, 2009.
- Namee, Matthew. "Fr. Raphael Morgan against Marcus Garvey". OrthodoxHistory.org (The Society for Orthodox Christian History in the Americas). March 29, 2010.
- White, Gavin. Patriarch McGuire and the Episcopal Church. In: Randall K. Burkett and Richard Newman (eds). Black Apostles: Afro-American Clergy Confront the Twentieth Century. G. K. Hall, 1978, pp. 151–180.
