= Ruben Spartas Mukasa =

Uganda Greek Orthodox bishop

His Eminence Christopher
- Bishop of Niloupolis
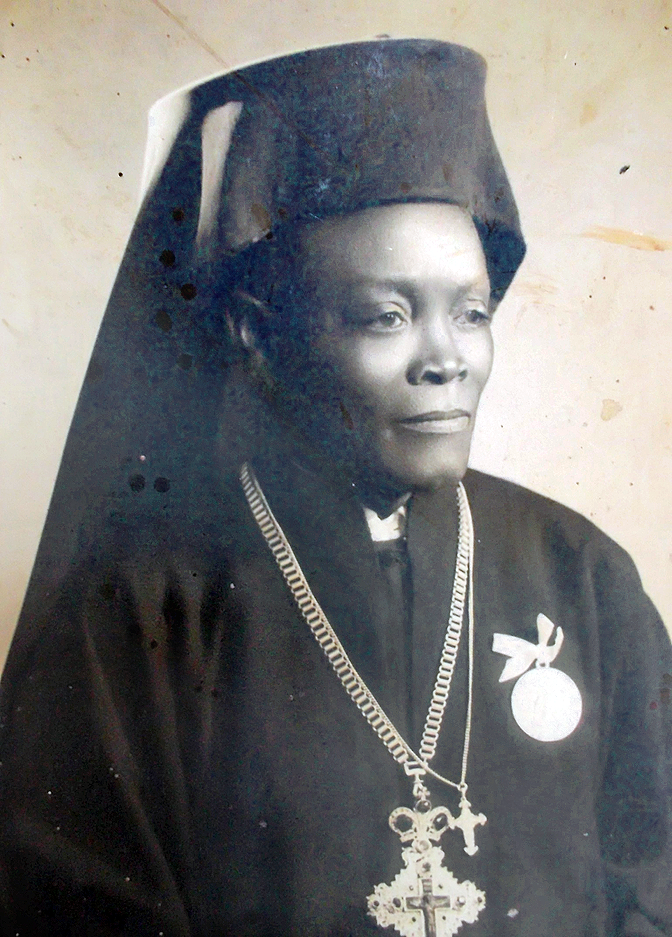
- Archdiocese: Alexandria
- Term ended: 1982

Orders
- Consecration: 17 December 1972

Personal details
- Born: Reuben Mukasa Mugimba Sobanja; 1899 Uganda
- Died: June 4, 1982 (aged 82–83)
- Denomination: Greek Orthodox
- Education: King's College, Budo

Bishop Christopher (secular name Ruben Spartas Mukasa, born Reuben Mukasa Mugimba Sobanja; 1899 – 4 June 1982) was an early-20th-century religious reformer in Uganda. He had been part of the King's African Rifles of the British Army, but came to feel that there needed to be an end to colonial rule in Africa and that this must be obtained through a religious rejuvenation with independent Christian churches.

Mukasa formed the African Progressive Association, the Christian Army for the Salvation of Africa and he also formed a branch of the African Orthodox Church in Uganda. That later came about in 1932 when Mukasa was ordained a priest by a bishop under Marcus Garvey.

However Mukasa later learned that the African Orthodox Church was not in line with the Ethiopian Orthodox Church and the Coptic Orthodox Church. Mukasa split with the western church and went to Alexandria where he was ordained by Patriarch Christophoros II.

Patriarch Christophoros was the Greek Orthodox Patriarch of Alexandria thus putting Mukasa into the Eastern Orthodox group present mainly in Εastern Europe, a different religious tradition from the Oriental Orthodox Churches that the Coptic and Ethiopian churches are part of.

Bishop Christopher died in 1982.

== See also ==
- Eastern Orthodoxy in Uganda

== Sources ==
- Boahnen, A. Abu. African Under Colonial Rule Vol. 7 in the History of Africa Series (Paris: UNESCO, 1990) p. 223.
- 2006 article on Orthodoxy in Uganda
- orthodoxwiki:Christopher Reuben Spartas
