= Greek Orthodox Patriarchate of Alexandria =

African church

Greek Orthodox Patriarchate of Alexandria and all Africa

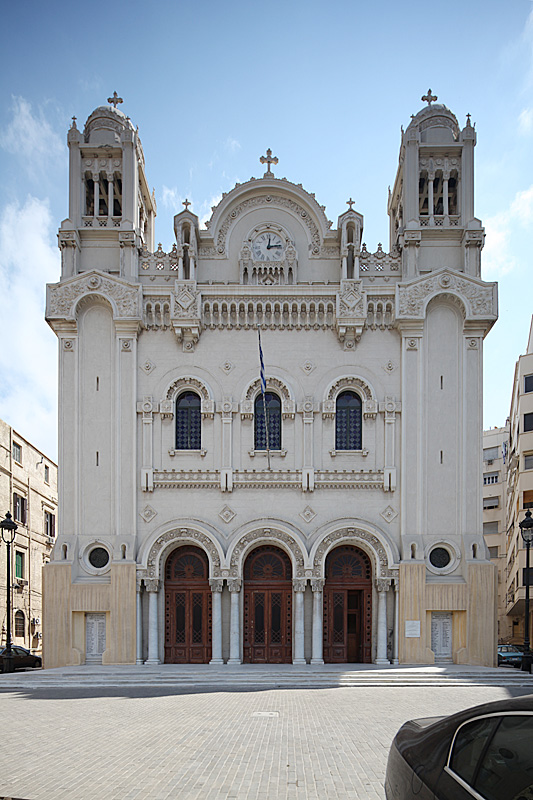
- Cathedral of the Annunciation, Alexandria
- Classification: Christian
- Orientation: Greek Orthodox
- Scripture: Septuagint; New Testament
- Theology: Eastern Orthodox theology
- Polity: Episcopal
- Primate: Patriarch Theodore II of Alexandria
- Language: Greek, Arabic, English, French, Portuguese, Swahili, Yoruba and many other African languages
- Liturgy: Byzantine Rite
- Headquarters: Alexandria, Egypt
- Territory: Africa
- Founder: Mark the Evangelist, according to; sacred tradition
- Origin: 1st century Alexandria, Egypt
- Independence: Apostolic Era
- Recognition: Eastern Orthodox Church
- Members: 500,000–1,500,000
- Official website: patriarchateofalexandria.com

The Greek Orthodox Patriarchate of Alexandria and All Africa (Ancient Greek: Πατριαρχεῖον Ἀλεξανδρείας καὶ πάσης Ἀφρικῆς, romanized: Patriarkheîon Alexandreías kai pásēs Afrikês, lit. 'Patriarchate of Alexandria and All Africa'), also known as the Greek Orthodox Church of Alexandria, is an autocephalous Eastern Orthodox church based in Africa. Its seat is in Alexandria, Egypt, and it has canonical jurisdiction over the entire African continent.

According to Eastern Orthodox tradition, the Greek Orthodox Church of Alexandria was established by Saint Mark the Evangelist, a companion of the Apostles, in the middle of the 1st century, and its emblem is the Lion of Saint Mark. In the history of early Christianity, the Church of Alexandria played a significant role, and many prominent Church Fathers were associated with Alexandria. Following the Council of Chalcedon in 451, disagreements over the nature of Christ led to a division between Dyophysite and Miaphysite Christians. The Dyophysite Christians in Egypt remained in communion with the Ecumenical Patriarchate of Constantinople and developed into the Greek Orthodox Patriarchate of Alexandria, while the Miaphysite Christians formed the Coptic Orthodox Church of Alexandria.

Together with the other four Chalcedonian patriarchates, the see of Alexandria formed part of the traditional Pentarchy of the early Christian Church. Following the East–West Schism in 1054, the Greek Orthodox Patriarchate of Alexandria remained in communion with the Ecumenical Patriarchate of Constantinople and the other Eastern Orthodox churches.

Over the centuries, the patriarchate's influence and the size of its Christian community declined significantly, particularly after the Arab conquest of Egypt and later historical developments. In the 20th and 21st centuries, however, the patriarchate experienced renewed growth through missionary activity, especially in sub-Saharan Africa, establishing new dioceses and attracting new Eastern Orthodox communities across the continent.

The patriarchate is headed by the pope and patriarch of Alexandria and All Africa, currently Theodore II of Alexandria, who has served as patriarch since 2004.

== History ==
=== Origins ===
The city of Alexandria was the capital of Roman Egypt and one of the largest and most influential cities of the Roman Empire, distinguished by its cosmopolitan population, including Greeks, Egyptians, and a substantial Jewish community.

The history of the Patriarchate of Alexandria is closely linked with the development of early Christianity and includes some of the most influential figures among the Church Fathers, particularly Athanasius and Cyril, who played decisive roles at the ecumenical councils of Nicaea (325) and Ephesus (431), respectively.

According to ecclesiastical tradition, Mark the Evangelist founded the Church of Alexandria around 43 AD, having been sent by the apostles Peter and Paul during the reign of the emperor Claudius.

Later traditions indicate that Mark traveled to Rome and northern Italy before returning to Alexandria, where he was eventually martyred, possibly during anti-Christian unrest. According to Eusebius of Caesarea and later hagiographical traditions, his death involved being dragged through the streets of the city.

The earliest Christian converts in Egypt were primarily drawn from the Hellenized Jewish population of Alexandria. However, Christianity rapidly expanded among the native Egyptian population, particularly in the Nile Valley. Evidence of this early expansion includes papyri from Oxyrhynchus (Bahnasa), as well as early Coptic translations of the Gospel of John, which date to the 2nd century.

The growth of Christianity in Egypt was influenced by broader social and political conditions. Roman administration, established after the conquest of Egypt in 30 BC, imposed a highly centralized system of taxation and governance that placed significant burdens on the local population.

Within this context, Christianity offered both a religious alternative and a framework for communal identity that transcended ethnic and social divisions. By the end of the 2nd century, Christian communities were firmly established throughout Egypt.

The symbol of the cross began to gain prominence among Alexandrian Christians, particularly within the emerging Coptic tradition. Earlier symbolic forms, such as the Chi Rho, were also used, especially in imperial contexts associated with Constantine the Great.

=== Development ===
Alexandria rapidly became one of the most important intellectual centers of early Christianity. The Catechetical School of Alexandria emerged as a leading institution for theological education, attracting scholars from across the Mediterranean world.

Among its most prominent teachers were Clement of Alexandria and Origen, whose writings had a profound influence on Christian theology. Origen, in particular, developed an allegorical method of scriptural interpretation and contributed significantly to early doctrinal formulation.

At the same time, Alexandria became a center for diverse theological movements. Gnostic teachers such as Basilides, Carpocrates, and Valentinus were active in the city, presenting alternative interpretations of Christian doctrine. These teachings were opposed by church authorities, who sought to define orthodoxy and maintain doctrinal unity.

Monasticism also developed in Egypt during this period and became one of the defining features of Alexandrian Christianity. Figures such as Anthony the Great and Pachomius established models of ascetic life that spread throughout the Christian world.

During the episcopate of Heraclas (231–248), the bishops of Alexandria adopted the title "Pope" (Greek: pappas), reflecting their growing authority within the Christian world.

The 4th century was marked by the Arian controversy, initiated by the Alexandrian presbyter Arius, who argued that the Son was subordinate to the Father. This teaching was condemned at the Council of Nicaea (325), convened by Constantine the Great.

Athanasius of Alexandria emerged as a central defender of Nicene orthodoxy and played a crucial role in shaping Trinitarian doctrine. His repeated exiles during the controversy reflect the political as well as theological dimensions of the conflict.

Alexandria’s influence extended beyond Egypt. In the 4th century, Christianity was established in the Kingdom of Aksum (modern Ethiopia and Eritrea) under the leadership of Frumentius, who was consecrated bishop by Athanasius.

=== Schism and late antiquity ===
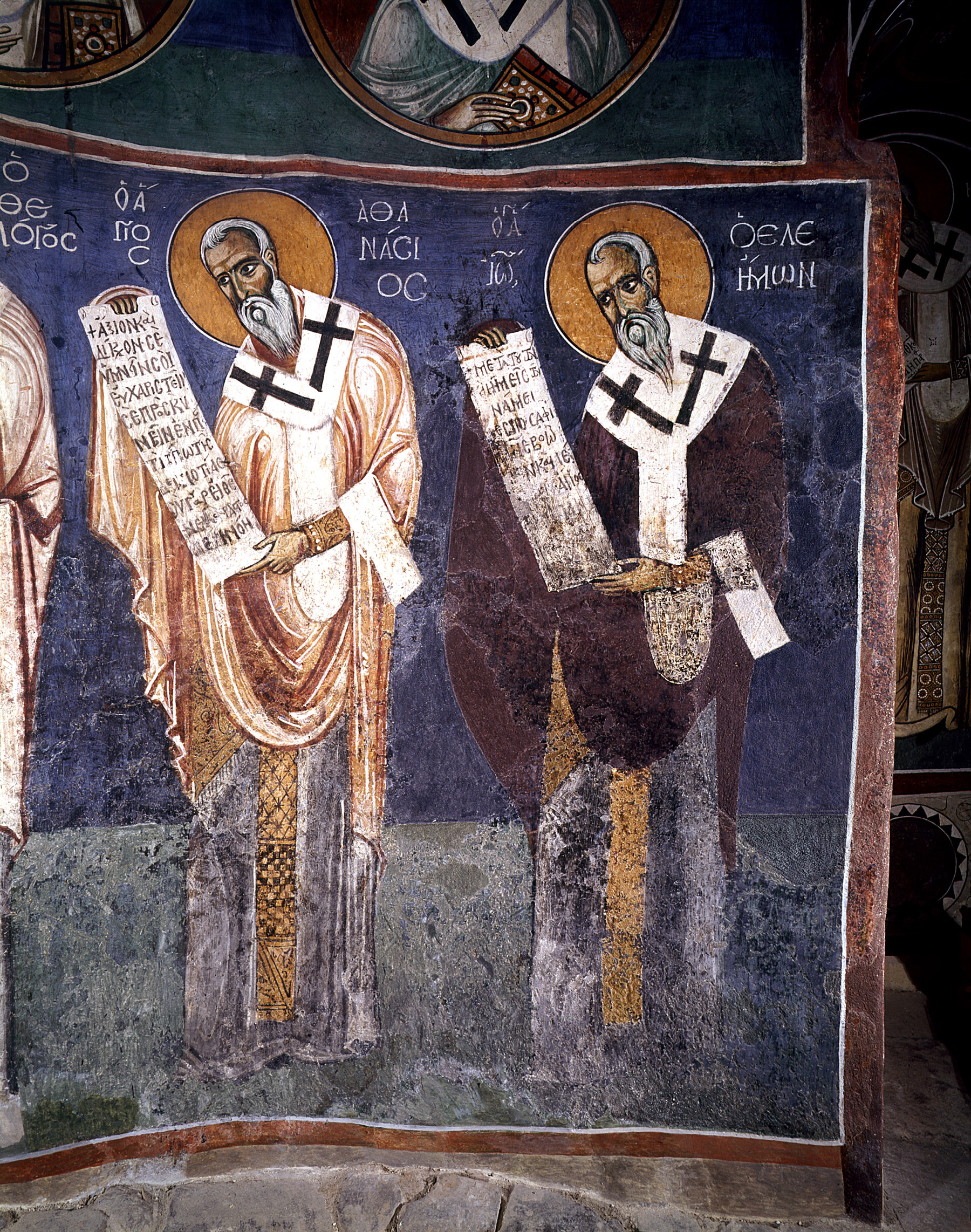
Fresco of Saints Athanasius and John the Almoner, Patriarchs of Alexandria

The 5th century brought profound theological divisions within the Christian world. The Council of Chalcedon (451) defined Christ as having two natures, divine and human, in one person. This definition was rejected by many Christians in Egypt, who adhered to Miaphysite theology.

The refusal of Patriarch Dioscorus I of Alexandria to accept Chalcedonian doctrine led to his deposition and the establishment of a rival patriarch. As a result, the Church of Alexandria split into two parallel hierarchies:

- The majority, composed largely of native Egyptians (Copts), formed what became known as the Coptic Orthodox Church.
- A minority, primarily Greek-speaking and aligned with imperial authority, formed the Chalcedonian (Greek Orthodox) Patriarchate of Alexandria.

These Chalcedonian Christians were often called "Melkites", a term derived from the Semitic word for "king", indicating their loyalty to the Byzantine emperor.

The division had profound social, cultural, and political consequences, reinforcing distinctions between the Greek-speaking elite and the Egyptian population. Over time, the Coptic Church became closely associated with Egyptian identity.

During the 6th and early 7th centuries, tensions between Chalcedonian and non-Chalcedonian communities were exacerbated by imperial policies, including attempts by emperors such as Justinian I to enforce doctrinal unity.

=== Persian and Arab conquest ===
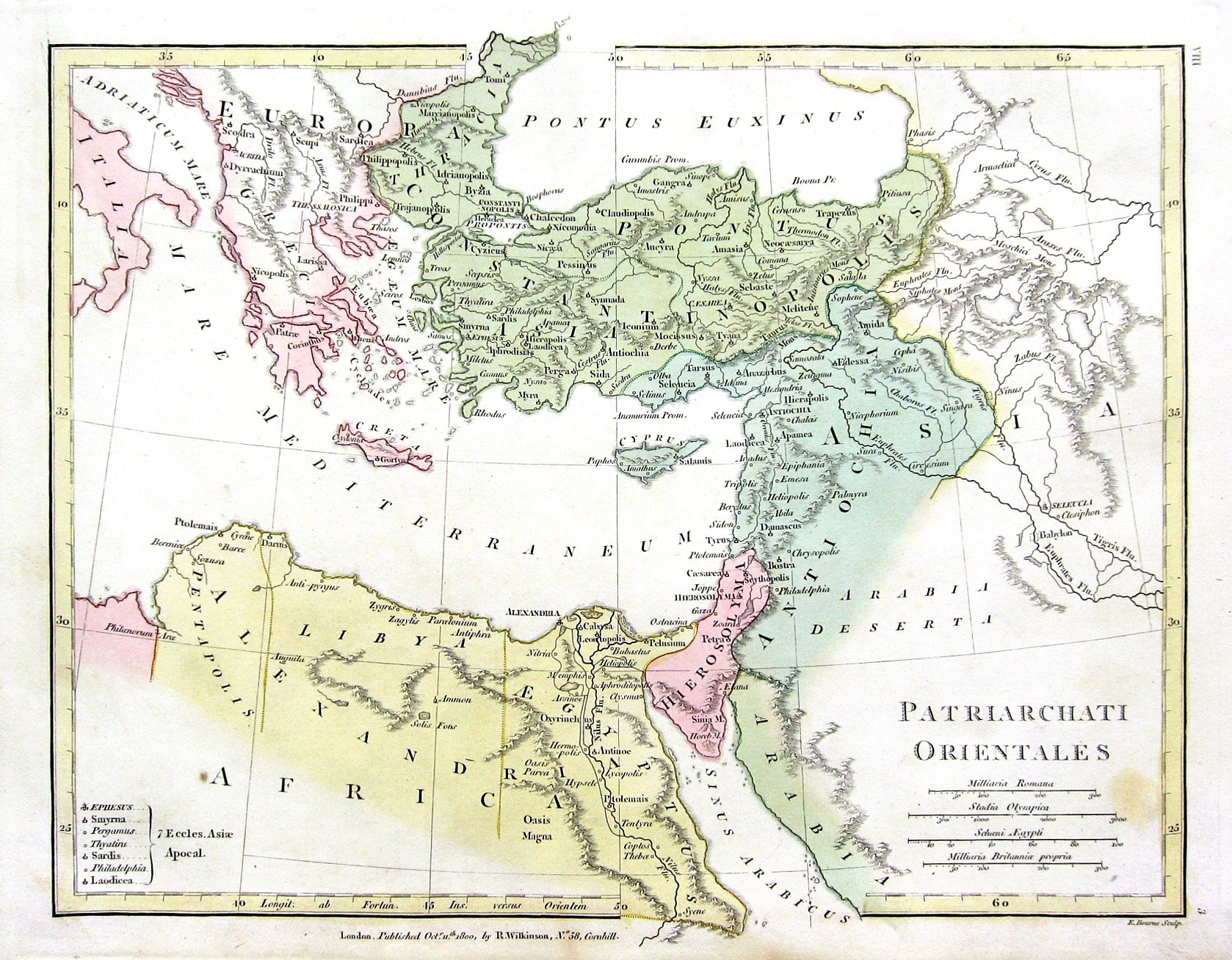
Pentarchy in 500 AD

In 619, Egypt was conquered by the Sasanian Empire, an event that disrupted Byzantine control and weakened the position of the Chalcedonian Church.

Although Byzantine rule was briefly restored, the region was soon conquered by Arab Muslim forces between 639 and 642.

The Arab conquest marked a turning point in the history of Christianity in Egypt. The Chalcedonian patriarch, closely associated with Byzantine authority, lost political support, while the Coptic Church, which had been marginalized under Byzantine rule, was relatively better positioned under the new administration.

Under Islamic rule, Christians were recognized as dhimmi communities and were allowed to practice their religion in exchange for paying the jizya tax. However, over time, the Greek Orthodox community declined significantly in both numbers and influence.

By the early 7th century, only about 300,000 of Egypt’s six million inhabitants belonged to the Greek Orthodox Church, while the majority adhered to the Coptic Church.

During the early Islamic period, the Greek patriarchate experienced a prolonged interruption, and its institutional structure weakened considerably. Many churches passed into the hands of the Coptic community.

=== Medieval period ===
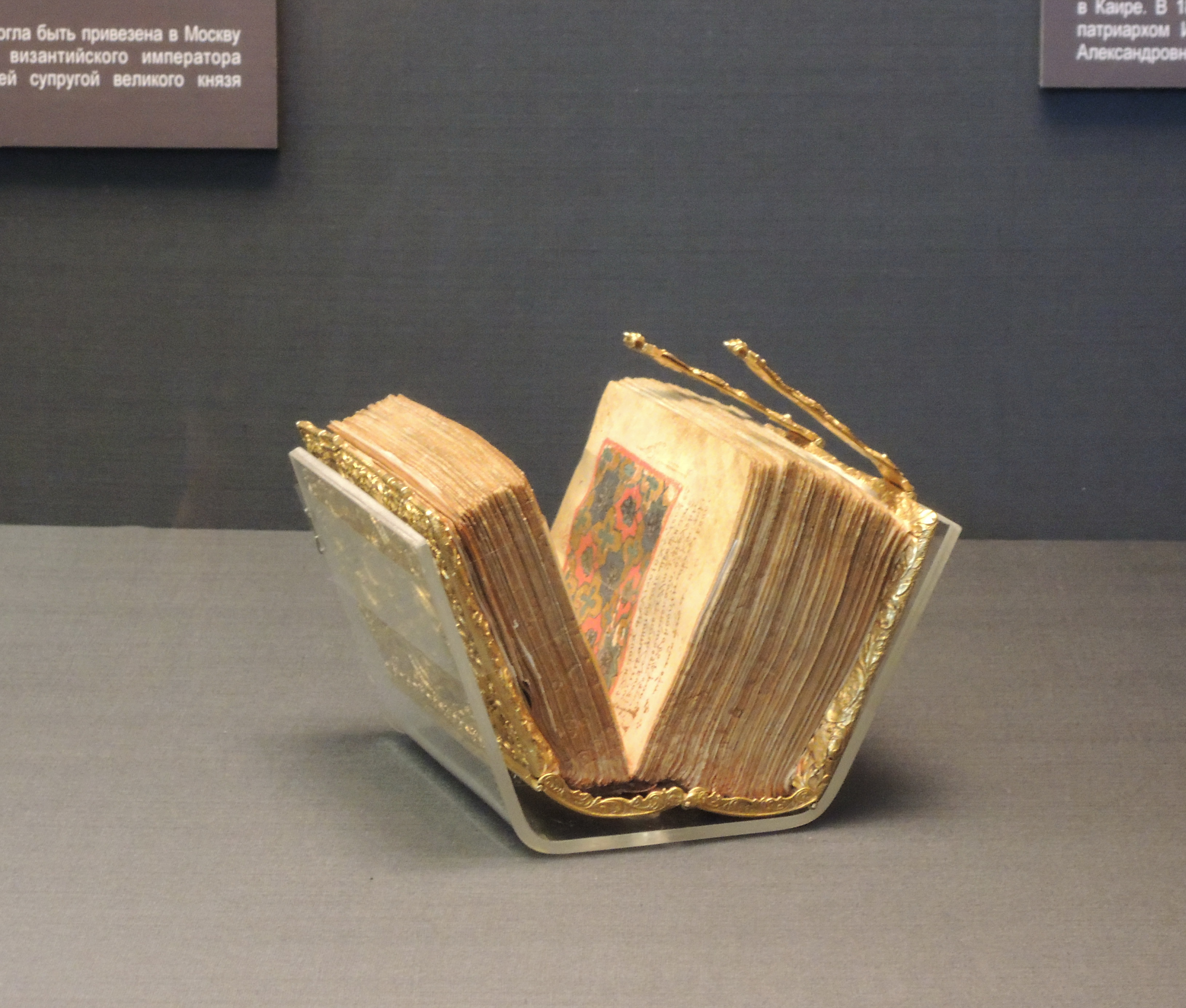
Illustrated 13th-century Greek Orthodox Gospel, presented in 1862 by Patriarch Jacob of Alexandria to Empress Maria Alexandrovna

From the 8th to the 15th centuries, the Greek Orthodox Patriarchate of Alexandria remained a small community with limited influence. Its leadership was often influenced by the Ecumenical Patriarchate of Constantinople, reflecting dependence on the Byzantine ecclesiastical world.

Despite the formal break between Eastern and Western Christianity in the East–West Schism of 1054, relations between Alexandria and Rome did not immediately cease. Contacts continued during the Crusades, when cooperation between Greek and Latin Christians was occasionally necessary. At times, Greek patriarchs permitted Latin clergy to minister to their communities, and Alexandrian representatives participated in broader ecclesiastical councils. However, tensions increased following the establishment of Latin patriarchates in the East.

Attempts at reunification, particularly at the Council of Florence (1439), were ultimately unsuccessful, especially after the fall of Constantinople in 1453, which further isolated the Alexandrian Patriarchate from both Western and Byzantine support.

During the 13th–14th centuries, most Patriarchs of Alexandria were of Greek origin. Many of them resided in Constantinople for extended periods and only rarely appeared in Egypt, while actively participating in the ecclesiastical life of Byzantium. The Alexandrian Church possessed almost no independent sources of income in Egypt and therefore remained in a chronically difficult financial situation, relying primarily on support from other Eastern patriarchs and assistance from Orthodox states.

The number of followers of the Greek Orthodox Church of Alexandria declined to approximately 90,000 by the beginning of the 13th century, and to only a few thousand by the onset of the Ottoman period. In the 1830s and 1840s, observers estimated the Eastern Orthodox community in Egypt at around 5,000 people. Most lived in Cairo, Alexandria, and Damietta, with smaller communities in Rosetta and Suez. In 1791, the Second plague pandemic severely affected this already small community.

=== Diaspora growth in the 19th century ===
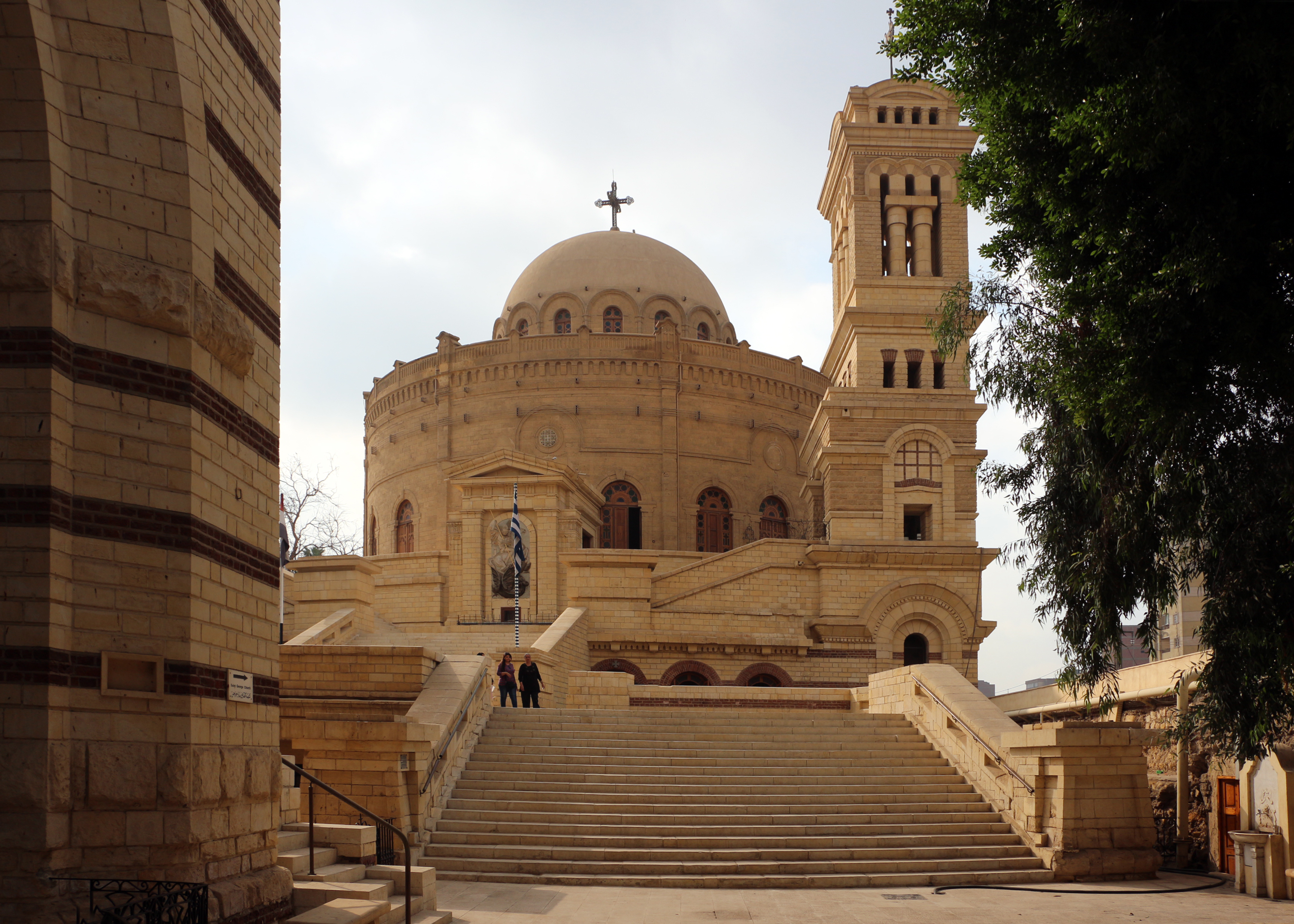
Saint George Church in Cairo

In the 19th century Orthodoxy in Africa began to grow again. One thing that changed this in the 19th century was the Orthodox diaspora. People from Greece, Syria and Lebanon, in particular, went to different parts of Africa, and some established Orthodox churches. Many Greeks also settled in Alexandria from the 1840s and Orthodoxy began to flourish there again, and schools and printing presses were established.

For a while there was some confusion, especially outside Egypt. As happened in other places, Orthodox immigrants would establish an ethnic "community", which would try to provide a church, school, sporting and cultural associations. They would try to get a priest for the community in the place they had emigrated from, and there was some confusion about which bishops were responsible for these priests.

Eventually, in the 1920s it was agreed that all Orthodox churches in Africa would be under the jurisdiction of the Patriarchate of Alexandria, and so Africa has managed to avoid the jurisdictional confusion that has prevailed in places like America and Australia.

In the early 20th century, the Greek Orthodox Patriarchate of Alexandria in Egypt had approximately 100,000 adherents. Of these, around 63,000 were ethnic Greeks, while the remaining 37,000 were Arab Orthodox Christians.

=== Mission growth in the 20th century ===
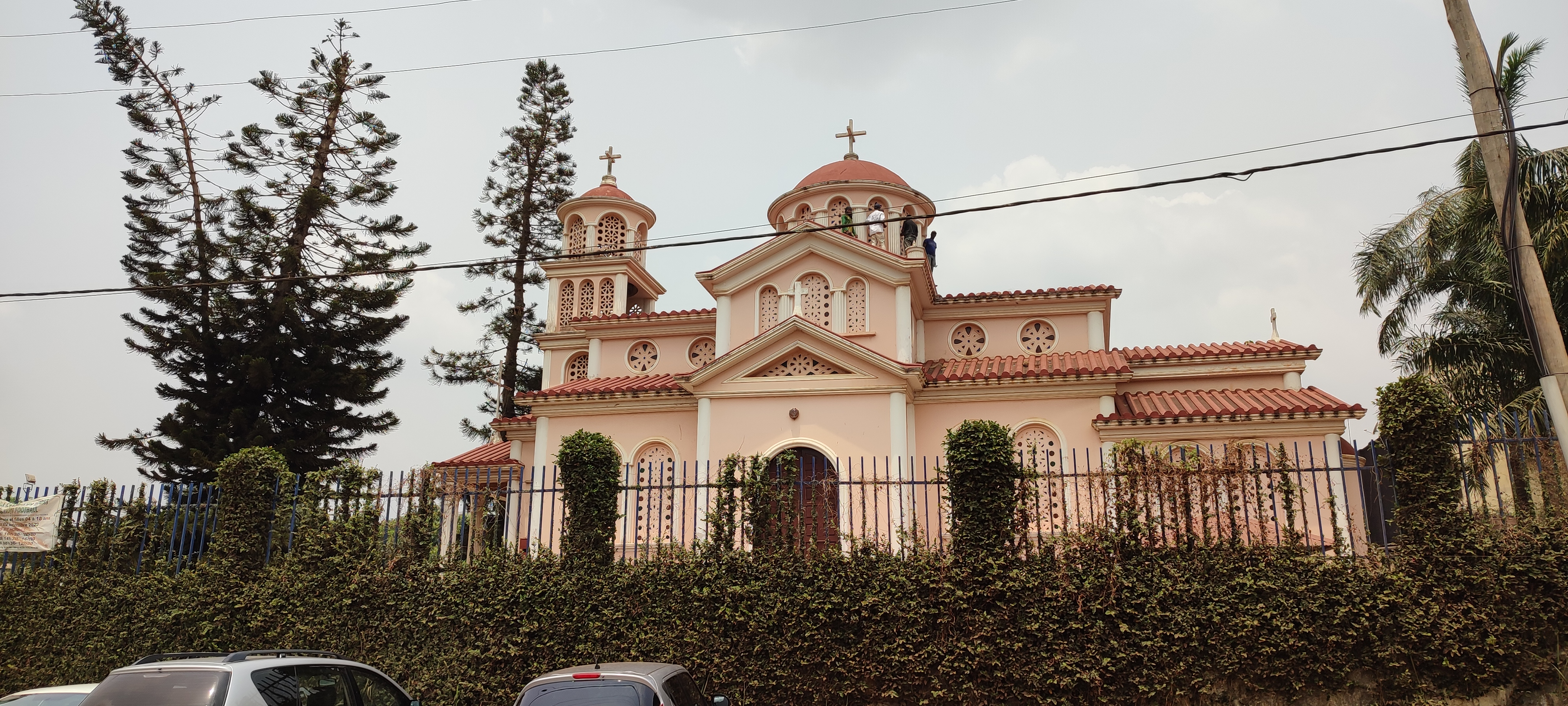
The Cathedral of the Annunciation in Yaoundé

After World War II many Greeks emigrated to western Europe, Australia, New Zealand, and Africa. In East Africa, without much initial effort on their part, these Greek-speaking emigrants attracted a sizable number of black Christians, who discovered in the Orthodox liturgy and sacramental worship a form of Christianity more acceptable to them than the more dogmatic institutions of Western Christianity. Also, in their eyes, Orthodoxy had the advantage of having no connection with the colonial regimes of the past. Orthodox communities, with an ever increasing number of native clergy, are spreading in Uganda, Kenya, and Tanzania.

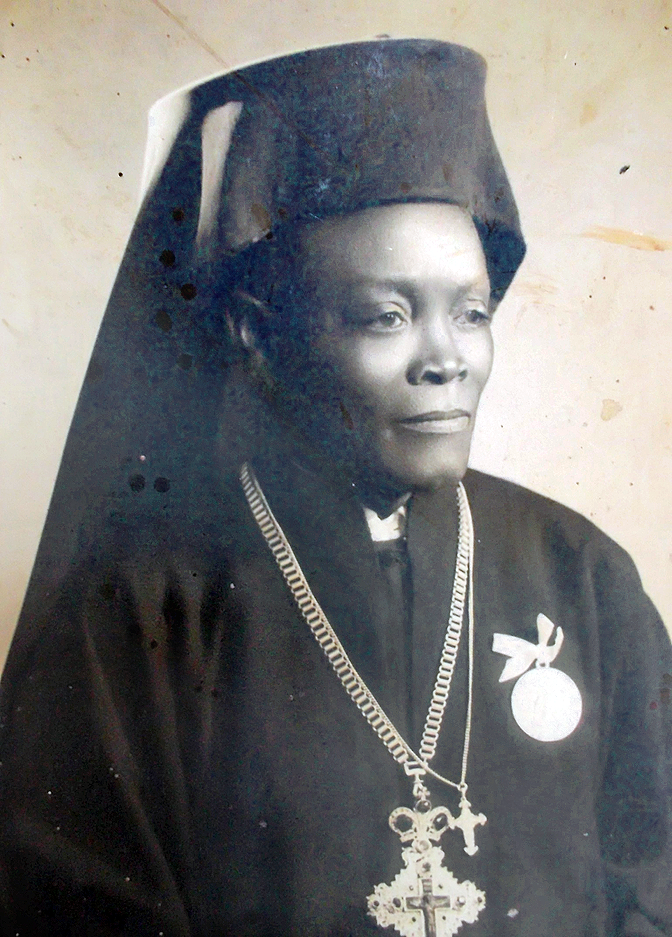
Bishop Christopher (Spartas), who played a significant role in the spread of Orthodox Christianity in Uganda

During the early 20th century, several African-initiated Christian movements emerged in response to colonial missionary structures and local religious conditions. Some of these groups came into contact with the African Orthodox Church, an Afro-American church founded in 1918 in the United States within the context of Marcus Garvey’s movement. Despite its name, the African Orthodox Church had no connection with the Eastern Orthodox Church and was an independent sacramental denomination. In 1932, a bishop of this church traveled to Uganda and ordained Ruben Spartas Mukasa and one of his associates as priests of the African Orthodox Church. A few years later, however, Mukasa and his followers chose to align with the Greek Orthodox Patriarchate of Alexandria. Mukasa later traveled to Alexandria and was ordained by the patriarch. After this shift, the African Orthodox Church lost its presence in Uganda.

The 1952 Egyptian coup d'état which brought the Arab nationalist government of Gamal Abdel Nasser was a turning point for the Orthodox Church in Egypt as increasing xenophobic attitudes of the pan-Arabist Egyptian Muslims due to events like nationalisation of industries (that were largely owned by non-Muslim foreigners) and dispute over the status of the Suez Canal precipitated into large-scale exodus of local Greeks. Rise of Islamism in Egypt, spearheaded by the Muslim Brotherhood, after Egypt's defeat in the Six Day War, also hastened the Exodus of Greek Christians.

In the 1950s, however, the Orthodox Church in Kenya suffered severe oppression at the hands of the British colonial authorities during the Mau Mau Uprising. Most of the clergy were put in concentration camps, and churches and schools were closed. Only the Cathedral in Nairobi (which had a largely Greek membership) remained open.

Archbishop Makarios III of Cyprus preached an anti-colonialist sermon at the cathedral on his way home from exile, and this led to friendship between him and the leader of the anti-colonial struggle in Kenya, Jomo Kenyatta.

After Kenya became independent in 1963 the situation eased, and the Greek-speaking Church of Cyprus helped to get the presence of the Greek Orthodox church in Kenya once more, building a seminary and sending missionary teachers.

=== Late 20th-early 21st century ===
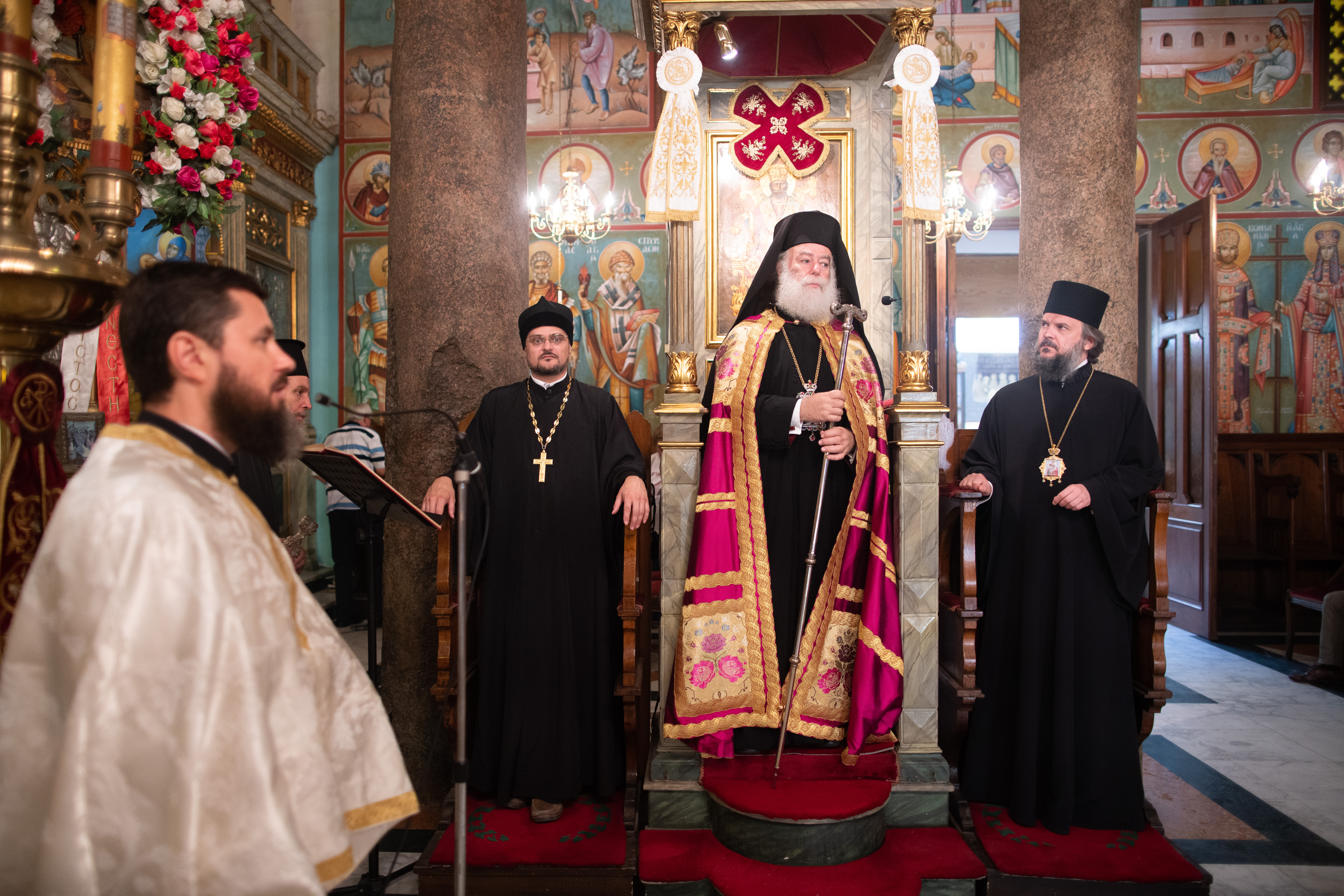
Patriarch Theodore II at the Monastery of St. Savvas in Alexandria

In recent years, a considerable missionary effort was enacted by Pope Petros VII. During his seven years as patriarch (1997–2004), he worked tirelessly to spread the Orthodox Christian faith in Arab nations and throughout Africa, raising up native clergy and encouraging the use of local languages in the liturgical life of the church. Particularly sensitive to the nature of Christian expansion into Muslim countries, he worked to promote mutual understanding and respect between Orthodox Christians and Muslims. He also worked to improve ecumenical relations with the Coptic Orthodox Church, signing a joint declaration allowing intermarriage and setting the stage for improved relations between the two ancient patriarchates. His efforts were ended as the result of a helicopter crash on September 11, 2004, in the Aegean Sea near Greece, killing him and several other clergy, including Bishop Nectarios of Madagascar, another bishop with a profound missionary vision. The metropolitans and bishops of this expanding church remain overwhelmingly of Greek or Cypriot origin. The current primate of the Greek Church of Alexandria is Theodoros II, Pope and Patriarch of Alexandria and all Africa.

=== 2019 schism with Moscow ===
On 27 December 2019 the Russian Orthodox Church officially cut ties with the Eastern Orthodox Patriarchate in Alexandria over the latter's recognition of the Orthodox Church of Ukraine (OCU), which is rejected by the Russian Orthodox Church and several other Orthodox churches. This was done after Theodore II announced support for the OCU. The Holy Synod of the Russian Orthodox Church noted that it remains in communion with clerics of the Alexandria church who reject Theodore II's decision and created a new Patriarchal Exarchate of Africa.

=== Ordination of women ===
In 2016, the Holy Synod of the Greek Orthodox Patriarchate of Alexandria voted to reinstate the deaconess; in the following year, it ordained six subdeaconesess in the Democratic Republic of Congo. In 2024 the Patriarchate ordained its first deaconess, Angelic Molen, in Zimbabwe, making her the first female deacon or deaconess in the modern history of the Eastern Orthodox Church. Women had been ordained as deacons or deaconesses in the Byzantine Church through the 9th century CE, after which the practice fell into disuse.

== Offikialoi of the Throne ==
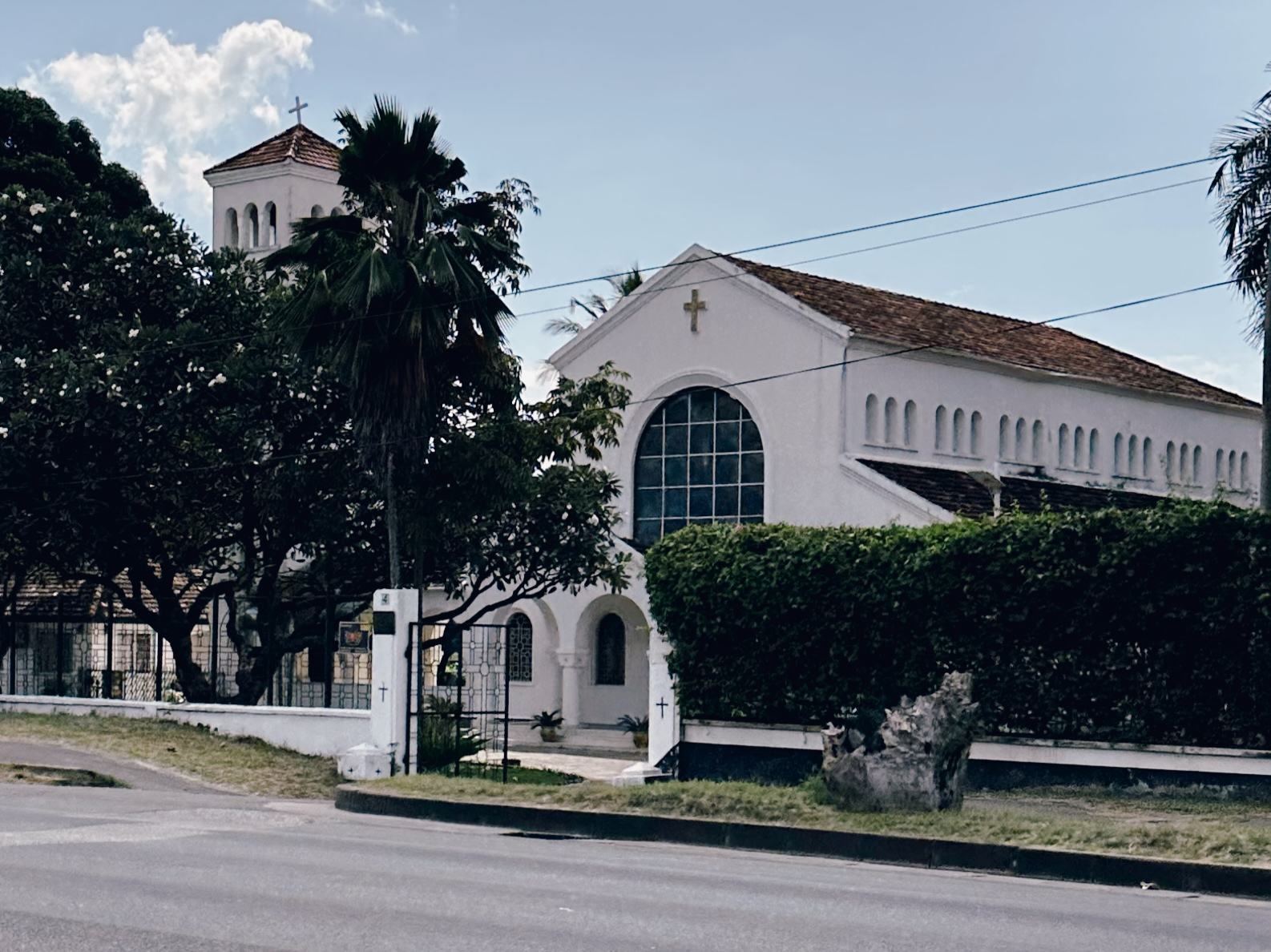
Greek Orthodox cathedral in Kivukoni, Tanzania.

The institution of the Offikialoi has its roots in the Hierarchy of the Byzantine Empire and primarily came into the ecclesiastical world around the 9th century, beginning with the Ecumenical patriarchate in Constantinople, where the offices existed hierarchically in three pentads. There are ecclesiastical offices, for both the clergy and lay people. However, the offices for lay people acquired greater validity and dissemination during the Ottoman period whence they were gradually disseminated to the other ancient Patriarchates of the East.

The offices are awarded by "patriarchal esteem and intention" as a recompense to the Patriarchate of Alexandria and all Africa, while in earlier years they were connected to particular positions within the patriarchal court and the administrative mechanism of the Patriarchate, which over the years slackened.

== Administrative structures and hierarchy ==
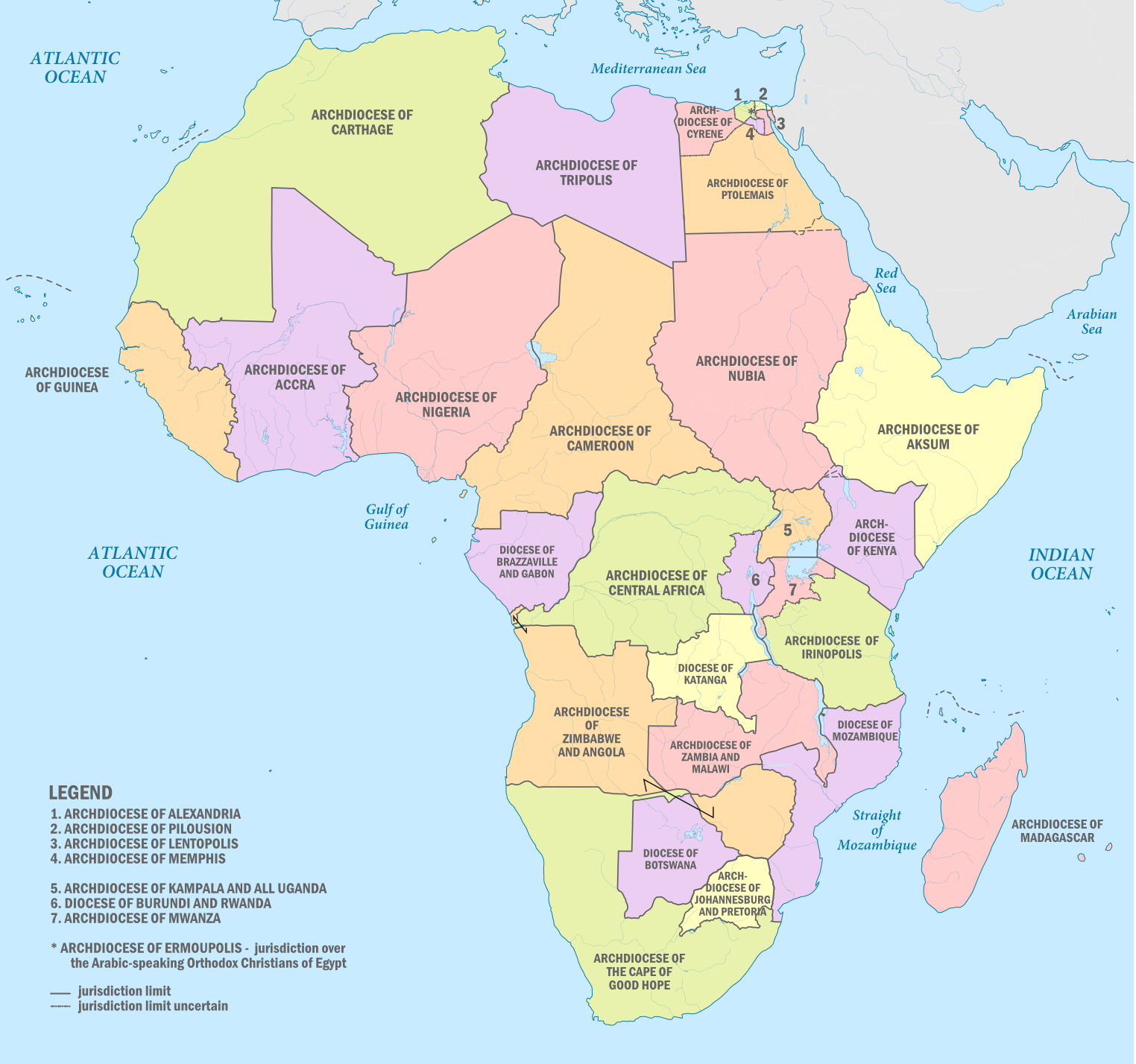
Dioceses and Archdioceses of the Greek Orthodox Church of Alexandria and of All Africa

=== Patriarch ===
- Patriarch Theodore II (Choreftakis), Pope and Patriarch of the Holy Archdiocese of Alexandria in Egypt, Primate of the Greek Orthodox Patriarchate of Alexandria and All Africa.

=== Archbishops (Metropolitans) ===
- Metropolitan Narcissus (Gammo) of the Holy Archdiocese of Accra with jurisdiction over Burkina Faso, Côte d'Ivoire, Gambia, Ghana, Guinea, Guinea-Bissau, Liberia, and Mali
- Metropolitan Peter (Giakoumelos) of the Holy Archdiocese of Axum, seated in Addis Ababa, with jurisdiction over the Horn of Africa
- Metropolitan Gennadius (Stantzios) of the Holy Archdiocese of Botswana with jurisdiction over Botswana
- Metropolitan Pantaleon (Arathymos) of the Holy Archdiocese of Brazzaville with jurisdiction over the Congo and Gabon
- Metropolitan Gregory (Stergiou) of the Holy Archdiocese of Cameroon with jurisdiction over Cameroon, the Central African Republic, Chad, Equatorial Guinea, and São Tomé and Príncipe
- Metropolitan Meletius (Koumanis) of the Holy Archdiocese of Carthage, seated in Tunis, with jurisdiction over Algeria, Mauritania, Morocco, and Tunisia
- Metropolitan Demetrius (Zacharengas) of the Holy Archdiocese of Dar es Salaam with jurisdiction over eastern Tanzania and the Seychelles
- Metropolitan Sergius (Kykkotis) of the Holy Archdiocese of Good Hope, seated in Cape Town, with jurisdiction over the South African provinces of the Eastern, Northern, and Western Cape, KwaZulu-Natal, and Free State, as well as Lesotho, Namibia, and Swaziland
- Metropolitan Nicholas (Antoniou) of the Holy Archdiocese of Hermopolis, seated in Tanta, with jurisdiction over the Arabic-speaking Orthodox Christians of Egypt
- Metropolitan Damascene (Papandreou) of the Holy Archdiocese of Johannesburg and Pretoria with jurisdiction over northeastern South Africa
- Metropolitan Jonah (Lwanga) of the Holy Archdiocese of Kampala with jurisdiction over Uganda
- Metropolitan Meletius (Kamiloudis) of the Holy Archdiocese of Katanga, seated in Lubumbashi, with jurisdiction over the Democratic Republic of the Congo
- Metropolitan Nicephorus (Konstantinou) of the Holy Archdiocese of Kinshasa with jurisdiction over the Democratic Republic of the Congo
- Metropolitan Gabriel (Raftopoulos) of the Holy Archdiocese of Leontopolis, seated in Ismailia, with jurisdiction over northeastern Egypt
- Metropolitan Ignatius (Sennis) of the Holy Archdiocese of Madagascar with jurisdiction over Madagascar, the Comoros, Mayotte, Mauritius, and Réunion
- Metropolitan Nicodemus (Priangelos) of the Holy Archdiocese of Memphis, seated in Heliopolis
- Metropolitan Jerome (Muzeeyi) of the Holy Archdiocese of Mwanza, seated in Bukoba, with jurisdiction over western Tanzania
- Metropolitan Makarios (Telyridis) of the Holy Archdiocese of Nairobi with jurisdiction over Kenya
- Metropolitan Nicodemus (Totkas) of the Holy Archdiocese of Nigeria with jurisdiction over Nigeria, Niger, Benin, and Togo
- Metropolitan Savvas (Cheimonetos) of the Holy Archdiocese of Nubia, seated in Khartoum, with jurisdiction over Sudan and South Sudan
- Metropolitan Nephon (Tsavaris) of the Holy Archdiocese of Pelusium, seated in Port Said
- Metropolitan Emmanuel (Kagias) of the Holy Archdiocese of Ptolemais, seated in Minya, with jurisdiction over Upper Egypt
- Metropolitan Theophylact (Tzoumerkas) of the Holy Archdiocese of Tripoli with jurisdiction over Libya
- Metropolitan Yohanis (Tsaftaridis) of the Holy Archdiocese of Zambia with jurisdiction over Zambia, Mozambique, and Malawi, seated in Lusaka
- Metropolitan Seraphim (Iakovou) of the Holy Archdiocese of Zimbabwe and Angola, seated in Harare
- Metropolitan Innocentius (Byakatonda) of the Holy Archdiocese of Burundi and Rwanda with jurisdiction over Burundi and Rwanda

=== Bishops ===
- Bishop Chrysostome (Karagounis) of the Holy Diocese of Mozambique
- Bishop Neophytos (Kongai) of the Holy Diocese of Eldoret and Northern Kenya
- Bishop Panaretos (Kimani) of the Holy Diocese of Nyeri and Mount Kenya
- Bishop Athanasius (Akunda) of the Holy Diocese of Kisumu and Western Kenya (Posthumously)
- Bishop Agathonicus (Nikolaidis) of the Holy Diocese of Arusha and Central Tanzania
- Bishop Silvestros (Kisitu) of the Holy Diocese of (Gulu) and eastern Uganda

== Demographics ==
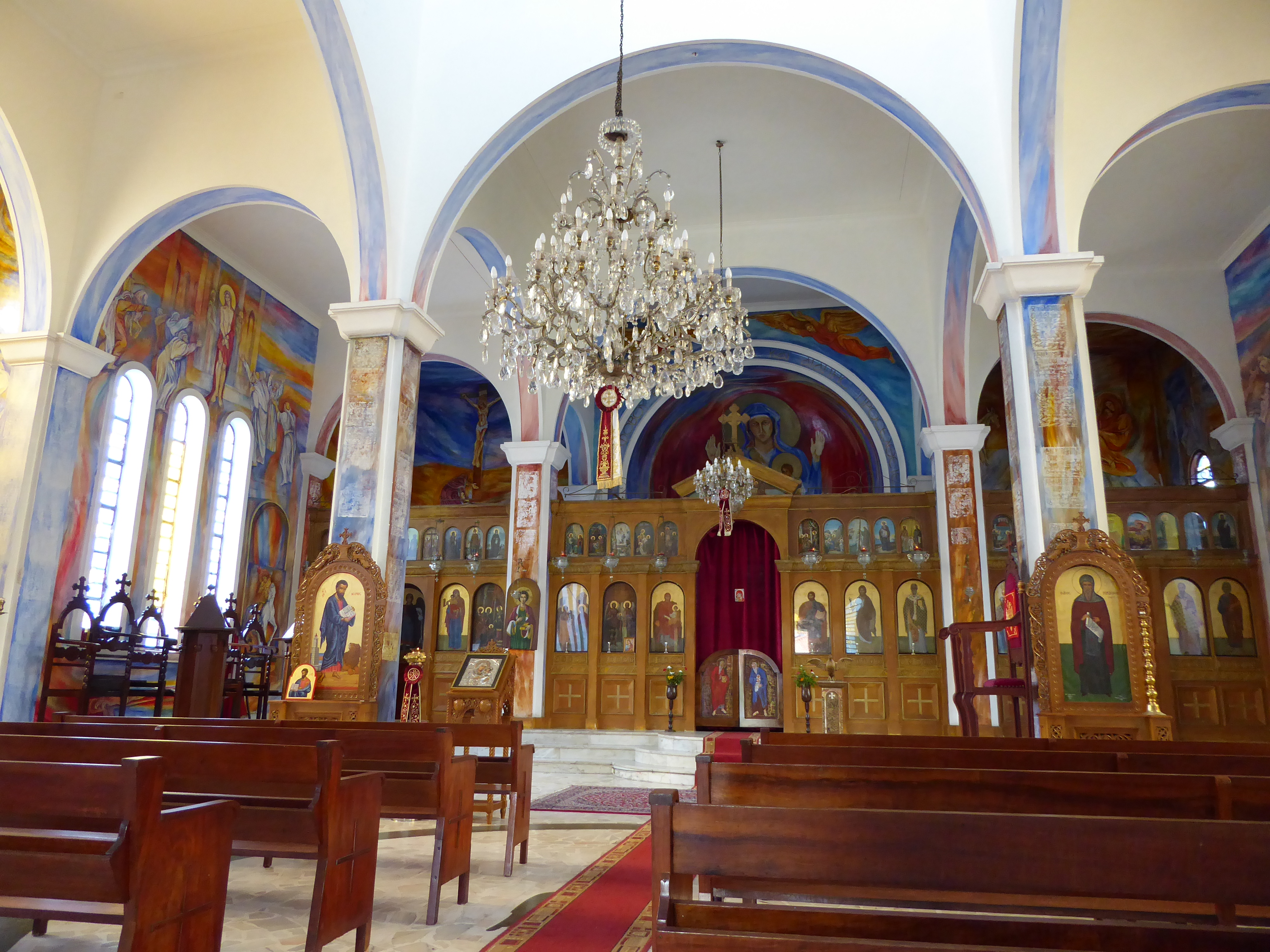
Inside view of the Orthodox Cathedral of Archangels Michael and Gabriel, Maputo, Mozambique

In Africa, the largest Eastern Orthodox community under the Greek Orthodox Patriarchate of Alexandria and All Africa is located in Kenya, with an estimated 300,000 adherents. This makes it one of the larger Orthodox communities in Sub-Saharan Africa under the jurisdiction of the Patriarchate of Alexandria. The Patriarchate maintains an institutional presence in the country, including four cathedrals, one seminary, 185 churches, eight missions, three orphanages, and 20 schools.

As of 2025, the number of Eastern Orthodox Christians in Tanzania is estimated at approximately 53,000. Its ecclesiastical presence includes two cathedrals, one seminary, 93 churches, three missions, and five schools.

According to the 2014 national census, Uganda had 48,421 Eastern Orthodox Christians. By 2022, the clergy of the Greek Orthodox Church of Alexandria in Uganda included more than 76 priests and five deacons serving approximately 100 communities. Church institutions include 41 church buildings, 17 medical clinics, and the Holy Cross Orthodox Church Mission Hospital.

As of 2025, the Greek Orthodox Patriarchate of Alexandria is estimated to have more than 50,000 members in Cameroon. Its presence includes one cathedral, one seminary, 30 churches, four missions, and ten chapels.

In South Africa, the Greek Orthodox Patriarchate of Alexandria reported 42,251 adherents in the 2001 national census. The patriarchate operates 28 churches and three cathedrals in the country.

As of 2020, the Greek Orthodox Patriarchate of Alexandria has approximately 31,500 members in the Democratic Republic of the Congo. The ecclesiastical structure in the country comprises one archdiocese, six cathedrals, one theological seminary, three monasteries, two missions, 55 churches, four chapels, and four schools.

As of 2020, the Greek Orthodox Patriarchate of Alexandria has approximately 30,000 members in Madagascar. Its ecclesiastical structure includes one cathedral, one seminary, one monastery, 20 churches, two chapels, two orphanages, one nursing home, and six schools.

As of 2020, the Greek Orthodox Patriarchate of Alexandria has approximately 7,700 members in Zambia. Its ecclesiastical structure includes one archdiocese, eight churches, and two chapels.

== See also ==
- List of Greek Orthodox Patriarchs of Alexandria
- Greeks in Egypt
- Syro-Lebanese in Egypt

== Literature ==
- Brakke, David (2008). "The East: Egypt and Palestine". The Oxford Handbook of Early Christian Studies. Oxford: Oxford University Press. pp. 344–364. ISBN 978-0-19-927156-6.
- Dick, Iganatios (2004). Melkites: Greek Orthodox and Greek Catholics of the Patriarchates of Antioch, Alexandria and Jerusalem. Roslindale, MA: Sophia Press. Archived from the original on 2023-06-08.
- Grillmeier, Aloys (1975) [1965]. Christ in Christian Tradition: From the Apostolic Age to Chalcedon (451). Vol. 1 (2nd revised ed.). Atlanta: John Knox Press. ISBN 9780664223014.
- Grillmeier, Aloys; Hainthaler, Theresia (1996). Christ in Christian Tradition: The Church of Alexandria with Nubia and Ethiopia after 451. Vol. 2/4. Louisville: Westminster John Knox Press. ISBN 9780664223007.
- Hayes, Stephen (November 1996). "Orthodox mission in tropical Africa". Missionalia. 24 (3): 383–398. Archived from the original on 2006-11-17.
- Kiminas, Demetrius (2009). The Ecumenical Patriarchate: A History of Its Metropolitanates with Annotated Hierarch Catalogs. Wildside Press LLC. ISBN 9781434458766.
- Koukousas, Vasileios (2012). "The Representation of the Patriarchate of Alexandria at Ferrara-Florence and the Fight against Proselytization in the Provinces from the 15th to 18th century: Investigation on the Basis of the Sources". Εκκλησιαστικός Φάρος. 94: 260–289.
- Loon, Hans van (2009). The Dyophysite Christology of Cyril of Alexandria. Leiden-Boston: Brill. ISBN 978-9004173224.
- Meyendorff, John (1989). Imperial Unity and Christian Divisions: The Church 450–680 A.D. Crestwood, NY: St. Vladimir's Seminary Press. ISBN 9780881410563.
- Ostrogorsky, George (1956). History of the Byzantine State. Oxford: Basil Blackwell.
- Panchenko, Constantin A. (2021). Orthodoxy and Islam in the Middle East: The Seventh to the Sixteenth Centuries. Jordanville, NY: Holy Trinity Publications. ISBN 9781942699330.
- Roussos, Sotiris (2010). "Eastern Orthodox Christianity in the Middle East". Eastern Christianity in the Modern Middle East. London-New York: Routledge. pp. 107–119. ISBN 9781135193713.
- Roussos, Sotiris (2011). "The Greek Orthodox Church in Interwar Egypt: Between Lay Constitutionalism and Diaspora Politics". Journal of Eastern Christian Studies. 63 (1–2): 127–142.
