= American Catholic Church =

American Catholic Church and American Catholic commonly refer to:

- Catholic Church in the United States, the Catholic Church, also known as the Roman Catholic Church, in the US

American Catholic Church may also refer to:

- American Catholic Church (1894), an 1894 – c. 1895 independent confederation of churches, composed of congregations which individually separated from the Catholic Church, founded by Anton Francis Kołaszewski and Alfons Mieczysław Chrostowski
- American Catholic Church (1915), a sect founded by Joseph René Vilatte and incorporated in Illinois in 1915
- American Catholic Church in the United States, a sect founded by Lawrence J. Harms and incorporated in Maryland in 1999

American Catholic may also refer to:

- AmericanCatholic.org, a Franciscan Media website with online editions of Catholic Update and St. Anthony Messenger

== See also ==
- Catholic Church, also known as the Roman Catholic Church
- Catholic Church by country
- Christianity in the United States
- Religion in the United States
