= Vilatte seminary at Sturgeon Bay =

The unnamed Vilatte seminary at Sturgeon Bay was a proposed Old Catholic seminary to be located in Sturgeon Bay, Wisconsin. It is known for changing local public opinion about Joseph René Vilatte.

== History ==
In March 1887, Vilatte, pastor of the Precious Blood mission, visited The Independent newspaper office, in Sturgeon Bay, and informed the newspaper that: he had solicited funds for building a seminary and "secured several thousand dollars for commencing the work", plans were being made in Chicago, Illinois, furnishings were secured, and "construction will be commenced in June". He was asked about his order and responded that the "order has a large number of adherents" in Europe and "is doubling every three years" in some of those countries. Curiously, the article did not mention the name of the order. In April, the Door County Advocate reported Vilatte visited Sturgeon Bay on 1887-04-25 to obtain a suitable location for the establishment of a college of his order. Although months earlier Vilatte said "construction will be commenced in June", by the end of May, the Door County Advocate reported, only that, he had "signified his willingness to establish a seminary in this city provided our people see fit to donate the required real estate", and that, a benefactor, who "will give the society other material aid if it is necessary to secure the institution for this city", donated 1 acre (0.40 ha) of land. In July, land "which has been purchased by the donations of our citizens" for the college, was transferred and work was to start on buildings in September. The next day the city council permitted "himself and family" to reside in a vacant school building; he was to operate a school in that building until his seminary was completed. In October, he began visiting cities along the East Coast of the United States "in quest of funds with which to erect the proposed seminary." He was away for several months. But a week after his return from touring the East Coast of the United States, Vilatte shocked Sturgeon Bay. His "contemplated seminary" would not be established there but elsewhere, wrote The Independent, in an article titled "Can this be true?" which exasperated that, "[t]he reasons given for this change are so extraordinary that we are not prepared to accept the statements made without further testimony." Vilatte wrote to Chris Leonhardt, President of the Business Men's Association, the group which facilitated the land purchase and aided him, that,

Our intention to build in this city a college for students of our denomination was about to be carried out, but after mature deliberation we find it necessary, because or ill-feeling and strong antipathy on the part of some of your fellow-citizens against us and our work, to postpone the matter until better days, [...] on many occasions [...] members of our family who have been spending the winter in this city have been publicly insulted in the streets and other places, and you will see how necessary it is that we protect the honor and the feelings of our students from such unpleasant occurrences and to guard them from such sad examples of ill-breeding and uncivilisation. [...] Since a large property in grounds, buildings, library and other requisites for a seminary are offered us elsewhere, we can afford to wait. Therefore, [...] we are compelled, by circumstances depending upon the conduct of your citizens alone, to withdraw for a while from your place, which is the center of our operations.

His letter was seen as a deleterious depiction of their community. The Independent editorialized,

This city is endeavoring to increase its population and resources by inviting manufacturers and others to locate here. A seminary to accommodate a large number of students was about to be built, all preliminary arrangements having been made, but that seminary is now lost to us because, as its projectors allege, they have encountered "ill-feeling, antipathy, and public insults" from some of our citizens. That we should lose an institution which would have annually distributed thousands of dollars among our merchants, farmers and others, is bad enough but to have it charged that our bigotry, bad manners and uncivilization have driven away one of the very institutions which many of us are striving to obtain is a foul blot upon the reputation of Sturgeon Bay and will cost us dearly unless it is removed. (Note: For letters to the editor about the public reaction to Vilatte changing the location of his development project see "Rather a flimsy pretext". Door County Advocate (letter to the editor). 26 (51). Sturgeon Bay, WI: Frank Long. April 14, 1888. Archived from the original on May 10, 2017. and Muldoon, P (April 21, 1888). "The Old Catholics and the savages". Door County Advocate (letter to the editor). 26 (52). Sturgeon Bay, WI: Frank Long. Archived from the original on March 4, 2016.)

Brown died within weeks of Vilatte's announcement, on 1888-05-02.

By 1889, Vilatte's scheme was apparent and he was seen as a scoundrel. The Door County Advocate wrote,

[...] Vilatte is about to establish a monastery at or near Little Sturgeon in the near future. This at any rate is the talk. Is it not a little singular that his "reverence" should continually be giving out that [...] he is about to build a college or something of the kind first at one place and then at another without ever accomplishing anything? What would be thought of a business man who would strike a town and under the promise of erecting a manufacturing establishment obtain the necessary site from the citizens, and after obtaining what he was after, turn around and tell the duped ones that their society was not up to his standard? This is precisely what [...] Vilatte did right here. He induced our people to give him several acres of land for a college site, and after he had secured this he immediately sought elsewhere for a location, using his success here as a lever to induce other towns to do a little better for him. Why, if a man did such things in the transaction of ordinary business he would be branded as a fraud at once, and he might consider himself fortunate were he not arrested for obtaining goods under false pretenses.

Emma de Beaumont, wife of Father Ernest, the Episcopal priest who had assisted Vilatte since 1887, wrote to the Door County Advocate that, regardless whatever Vilatte had said, nothing had been done "toward building a college elsewhere" since Brown's death "upset whatever may have been the plan".

[Brown] ordered us here, [...] from New York to take charge of the new college, and after waiting [...] over ten months, during which we suffered much, we were left by [... Vilatte]. We have been the first to suffer from the many changes you speak of in [...] Vilatte. We have given our time and spent our money, and are yet patiently waiting for a new bishop. [...] It is also true that [...] Vilatte intends to convert Little Sturgeon into a monastery, but we consider the matter as one of the many utopias of his reverence, and do not see how he can do so without his bishop's consent. [...] we received a communication from [...] Vilatte which stated in effect that he intended abandoning the work, and immediately afterward he turns about and commences the erection of a new church at Dyckesville. So you see one cannot well put any faith in what he says, he is so changeable, not considering a project before beginning it. I think it is well that you should know that there is no college anywhere; that the bubble burst long ago, and that any statement made to the contrary is false. [...] Our furniture and other possessions have been packed [...], we are here waiting, wiser, but much poorer, for having seen the work of [...] Vilatte.

This project was never carried out, and the land was returned to the donors.
