= National Catholic Diocese in America =

- Episcopal administrator: John Francis Tichy
- Headquarters: Cleveland, Ohio
- Founder: John Francis Tichy
- Origin: January 18, 1905; Cleveland, Ohio
- Separated from: Catholic Church
- Other name: National Catholic Church

The National Catholic Diocese in America (1905 – c. 1916) was an Old Catholic diocese in the United States for non-Polish Slavs.

== History ==
According to The Churchman, it was planned originally that this movement among the Bohemians and Slavs should be affiliated with that among the Poles, headed by Kozlowski, but at the last Polish Reformed Synod it was determined to keep that Church exclusively racial, and the Bohemians and Slavs, after consultation with the Old Catholic Church of the Netherlands (OKKN) Archbishop Gerardus Gul, of Utrecht, and Christian Catholic Church of Switzerland (CKS) Bishop Eduard Herzog, decided to form a diocese of their own to coordinate the action and influence of the "independent catholic" congregations of Slavs, Croatians, Dalmatians and Bohemians in the United States. William Larrabee wrote, in Schaff–Herzog Encyclopedia of Religious Knowledge, a number of independent congregations in several cities were united under an episcopal administration.

This organization, called the "National Catholic Church" by Larrabee, was "formed upon the same basis" as the CKS in "theoretical as well as practical matters." According to Larrabee, it was friendly toward the Polish organization and to the Protestant Episcopal Church in the United States of America (PECUSA).

John Francis Tichy was appointed as episcopal administrator by Gul.

Tichy incorporated the "National Catholic Diocese in America" (NCDA) in 1905 in Ohio "to foster the religious principles of the orthodox Catholic National Church, deriving its jurisdiction from the Old Roman Catholic Church."

== See also ==
- American Catholic Church (1894)
- American Catholic Church (1915)
- Polish National Catholic Church
