= American Catholic Church (1894) =

Independent confederation of congregations

- Abbreviation: ACC
- Metropolitan Archbishop and Primate: Joseph Vilatte
- Vicar general: Anton Kolaszewski
- Consultor: Stephen Kaminski
- Headquarters: Greenbay, Wisconsin
- Founder: Anton Kolaszewski
- Origin: Cleveland, Ohio
- Separated from: Catholic Church
- Defunct: c. 1895
- Publications: Jutrzenka

The American Catholic Church (1894 – c. 1895) was an independent confederation of congregations, which individually separated from the Catholic Church. It was founded by Anton Francis Kołaszewski and Alfons Mieczysław Chrostowski in the United States.

== History ==
The first convention of the American Catholic Church (ACC1894) appointed Joseph René Vilatte as its ecclesiastical head who was "without arbitrary powers". Constantine Klukowski wrote, in History of St. Mary of the Angels Catholic Church, Green Bay, Wisconsin, 1898–1954, that the 1894 Green Bay city directory lists Vilatte's cathedral, which was built in 1894, "as 'American Catholic'" and its officials as: Vilatte, archbishop metropolitan and primate; Kolaszewski, vicar general; Stephen Kaminski, consultor; and, Brother Nicholas, church manager.

== See also ==
- American Catholic Church (1915)
- National Catholic Diocese in America
- Polish Independent Catholic Church of America
- Polish National Catholic Church
- Polish Old Catholic Church of America
