= Alfons Mieczysław Chrostowski =

Author, playwright, and editor of Polish language newspapers in the United States

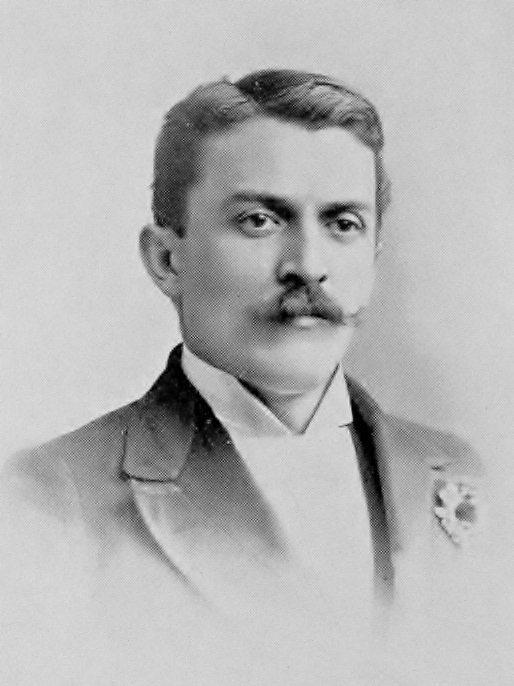
- Occupations: Author, playwright, and editor of polish language newspapers in the united states
- Notable work: Nihiliści

Signature
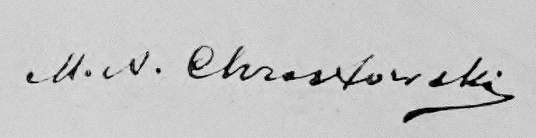

Alfons Mieczysław Chrostowski (c. 1860 – after 1920), also Mieczysław Alfons Chrostowski, was a Polish author, playwright, and editor of Polish language newspapers in the United States. He is known for Nihiliści, a Polish language play. Karen Majewski wrote, in Traitors and True Poles, that Chrostowski is an exemplar of an alternative Polish collective identity based on social class in preference to ethnic group or nationality.

== Biography ==
Chrostowski was born in Russian Poland of a noble Polish Family.

He was a self-proclaimed active member of the Russian Nihilist movement. He was educated in Moscow, where he was involved in revolutionary circles and joined the Black Hand Society. He was wounded in an attack on a government newspaper office which resulted in his expulsion under a police guard. He was sent back home by the government. He escaped or emigrated to the United States before 1887.

He was a member of Ognisko, a New York group of immigrant radical leftist journalists and social activists. (Note: For a discussion of Ognisko, see: Cygan, Mary E (1989). Political and cultural leadership in a immigrant community: Polish American Socialism, 1880–1950 (PhD). Northwestern University. OCLC 26135984. Also: Cygan, Mary E (1996). "The Polish-American left". In Buhle, Paul; Georgakas, Dan (eds.). The immigrant left in the United States. SUNY series in American labor history. Albany: State University of New York Press. ISBN 0791428834.)

"While he played a role in the establishment of Immaculate Heart of Mary Church," Charles Kaczynski wrote, in Polish American Studies, that "Chrostowski became a pivotal character in the establishment of the American Catholic Church." In 1894, a national convention of seceding Polish Roman Catholics, according to The New York Times, organized "a new church society, under the adopted name of American Catholic Church" in which "the separate churches comprising the society are to control and possess their own property" and feature "free seats and parochial schools". During the convention, Archbishop Joseph René Vilatte "was appointed the ecclesiastical head of the new church" but he was "to be without arbitrary powers" and subordinate bishops would be elected. Chrostowski proposed a motion "that all allegiance to the Pope of Rome be renounced, but after a warm discussion this motion was not carried." After announcing plans to hold its second convention, according to Kaczynski, "the American Catholic Church seemingly disappeared from the historical record."

Majewski wrote that "all traces of him seem to disappear within Polonia by early 1900s"; except, in 1915, he was arrested "on a warrant charging him with being deranged" based on letters he wrote to President Woodrow Wilson and his Cabinet and was held for observation at Bellevue Hospital Center, and according to Majewski, he is listed in 1920 United States census as a 48-year-old playwright.

== Works or publications ==
=== Nihiliści ===
His play Nihiliści (Nihilists) was performed by workers' theater groups in the United States and banned in New York City at insistence of Russian consul.

It about the Pervomartovtsy, members of the Russian left-wing terrorist organization Narodnaya Volya, and their successful assassination of Tsar Alexander II of Russia with a bomb on March 13, 1881. According to Karol Estreicher, the play was banned because of rumors that a "live dynamite bomb was supposed to be set off".

Nihilists, his 1894 English translation of Nihiliści, was dedicated to Vilatte.

=== Other creative works ===
- Buntowszcyzk (novel) (in Polish). Cleveland: Jutrzenka. 1900. LCCN 00005869.
- Rok życia (novel) (in Polish). Serialized in Ognisko (in Polish). New York. OCLC 21101941.
- Śmierć Ulianowa (novel) (in Polish).
- Uwiedziona (novel) (in Polish).

Chrostowski wrote other revolutionary works that were published anonymously in European periodicals, according to Majewski.

=== Newspapers ===
Chrostowski was editor of the following Polish language newspapers:

- Jutrzenka (in Polish). consecutively Pittsburgh then Cleveland.
- Ojczyzna (in Polish). Cleveland.
- Postęp (in Polish). New York.
- Reforma (in Polish). Chicago.
- Świat (in Polish). New York.
