= Stephen Kaminski =

Personal details
- Born: Fryderyk Roeder; 1859
- Died: September 19, 1911 Buffalo, New York
- Denomination: independent Catholic

Ordination history of Stephen Kaminski
History
Priestly ordination
- Ordained by: Joseph René Vilatte
Episcopal consecration
- Consecrated by: Joseph René Vilatte

Stephen Kaminski (born Fryderyk Roeder, 1859 – September 19, 1911) was the bishop of an independent Christian diocese known as the Polish Independent Catholic Church of America. He is considered to have been an episcopus vagans. (Note: According to Henry R. T. Brandreth, in Episcopi Vagantes and the Anglican Church, a modern episcopus vagans is one "who has, or claims to have, received irregular or clandestine consecration; or, having been consecrated regularly and canonically, has been excommunicated by, or otherwise cut off from, the Church which consecrated him, and is not in communion with any historic metropolitical See. The main ground of objection against him is that, in spite of resounding claims to the contrary, his episcopal status is doubtful, and that, even if his orders are valid, the exercise of them is not legitimate. In many cases the church over which he claims to preside appears to exist, if it exists at all except on paper, for the sake of the bishop rather than the bishop for the sake of the Church.")

== Early life ==
Stephen Kaminski, whose real name was Frydryk Roeder, was born in West Prussia. According to Wacław Kruszka in Historya Polska w Ameryce, Kaminski did not attend any college, but learned how to play the organ from a local organist. After leaving the army, he forged official documents for which he received a two-year prison term. Upon his release, he emigrated to the United States where he clung to various priests as an organist. He felt called to the religious life and joined the Franciscan order in Pulaski, Wisconsin, but was expelled and moved to Manitowoc, Wisconsin, where he swept a printery but was "driven out"; he then milked cows as a farmhand.

He worked in a nursing home in Manitowoc.

He was organist at Father Dominic Hippolytus Kolasinski's independent Sweetest Heart of Mary Church in Detroit, Michigan (which Vilatte consecrated in 1893) but later quarreled with Kolasinski and wrote against him in newspapers.

As a result, he joined Archbishop Joseph René Vilatte's Old Catholic group.

== Priest ==
Vilatte ordained Kaminski a priest in Cleveland on 24 August 1894.

In the same year, at a congress of representatives of the national parish was elected bishop of Polish Independent Catholic Church also known as Polish Catholic Church in North America.

When Vilatte visited Cleveland, Ohio, to dedicate Fr. Anton Francis Kolaszewski's original Immaculate Heart of Mary Church building and cemetery on August 18, 1894, he ordained Kaminski. The dedication ceremonies were marred by a riot, caused by protesters in the streets, that included a stabbing and shooting.

After ordination, Kaminski took up pastoral activity in independent Polish-American parishes.

In 1895 Kaminski and a faction of his adherents occupied the Polish parish church of St. Paul, a Roman Catholic church of the Diocese of Omaha in South Omaha, Nebraska, where he conducted devotion "in his own way". (Note: A sense-for-sense translation of the Polish idiomatic expression "po swojemu" is "in his own way". The literal translation does not convey the meaning. See: Brooks, Maria Zagórska (1975). Polish Reference Grammar. Slavistic printings and reprintings., Text-book series. Vol. 2. The Hague: Mouton. p. 302. ISBN 9027933138.) It is unclear how this occupation of the church happened, or for how long it lasted, but on the morning of March 11, 1895, while Kaminski celebrated Mass in the church, 40 Polish men gathered at the church and eight of them then entered and called on Kaminski to give them the keys to the church. He refused and, standing before the altar and holding revolvers in both hands with six more revolvers and two carbines on the altar, without saying anything he started shooting. He shot Joseph Dargaszewski through his right knee and then shot at the altar to create the impression that he had also been shot at. Later that month, on March 31, 1895, calling him "a Polish nationalist who posed as a priest", Elia W. Peattie wrote, in the Omaha World-Herald: "Kaminski barricaded himself in the sanctuary and used firearms to retain control, wounding Xavier Dargaczewski and Frank Kraycki." Peattie quoted in her article: "The priest, he say: 'I never leave this town till I see the bare bones of this church!' And he is seein' 'em!" It was rumored he started the fire that burned the church, at the end of that month, to a pile of rubble and ashes; Kaminski's faction damaged fire hydrants so there was no way to extinguish the fire. Kaminski was arrested. From Omaha he went to Freeland, Pennsylvania, where he stayed only a few months because he could not obtain any adherents among the local independent division; from Freeland he went to New Britain, Connecticut. According to Kruszka, the 1895 organization of a Roman Catholic parish in New Britain caused a four-month dispute over the location of its church. The parishioners were scattered throughout the town and wanted to have the church nearby. Two factions formed, at opposite ends of the city. The Roman Catholic priest could not reconcile their differences. One faction purchased property for the new Roman Catholic church; the other faction also purchased property and obtained Kaminski for their church. After a replacement Roman Catholic priest was assigned to the Roman Catholic parish, the dispute was settled and Kaminski was dismissed by the disbanded faction. Finally, from New Britain he went to Buffalo, New York, in 1896.

Kruszka described the Buffalo situation as being the same that took place in Omaha. He wrote that, in June 1894, Apolinary Karwowski announced in Alfons Mieczysław Chrostowski's Jutrzenka, in Cleveland, that Kolaszewski and Wladyslaw Debski arrived in Buffalo to establish an independent parish.

Hieronim Kubiak wrote, in The Polish National Catholic Church in the United States of America from 1897 to 1980, that the first independent parishes in the United States were organized by German, Irish, and French Catholics. A "pattern of a parish conflict" was already in place when Poles set up their independent parishes. "As long as the conflict continued, the parish most often divorced itself from the jurisdiction of the accused bishop and stood independent of him, which did not mean that the parish did not consider itself belonging to the Catholic Church symbolized by the Pope. In the division with the bishops, the parish kept very strictly to the rules of the norm of religious life, finding in it a further support for the rightness of their cause." Return to the previous state of affairs, exist in isolation and then vanish, or create "a self-determined religious movement" are the three alternative results, according to Kubiak.

According to Kruszka, the causes of this "social ulcer" (Note: A calque of the Polish idiomatic expression "wrzód społeczny" is "social ulcer".) can be found several years earlier when Poles began immigrating to Buffalo in large numbers. They had only one church prior to 1886; they built an additional church, without waiting for the permission of Bishop Stephen V. Ryan of the Roman Catholic Diocese of Buffalo, but a storm demolished it; they demanded another church and only under pressure from the Congregation for Propagation of the Faith was a second church built. Even so, there was by this time resentment and bitterness among the people which created prejudices against the clergy. That "social ulcer" burst in 1895 when a group demanded that Ryan relinquish ownership and management of their church; Ryan did not agree to the conditions, so the rebels schismed from the RCC and organized an independent parish. Their parish did not develop at all, because everyone thought their pastor, Antoni Klawiter, was morally bankrupt. Klawiter eventually left, intent on reconciling with the RCC, and Kaminski, who was according to Kruszka another notorious adventurer like Klawiter, replaced him. From 1896 until May 3, 1907, Kaminski was pastor of Holy Mother of the Rosary Parish in Buffalo. According to Kruszka, Kaminski once counted under his jurisdiction a parish in Buffalo, a parish in Chicopee, Massachusetts, and a parish in Baltimore, Maryland.

== Bishop ==
After the formal constitution of the Polish Catholic Church in Buffalo, Kaminski as bishop-elect attempted to obtain consecration.

To this end, in 1897, he tried to establish friendly relations with Old Catholic Church in Europe.

The Old Catholic Churches' Union of Utrecht (UU), however, already had a representative in the United States of America, Kozlowski, and did not intent to affect Kozlowski's autonomy.

Kozlowski was willing to consecrate Kaminski.

Kaminski failed to persuade the Old Catholic Archbishop of Utrecht to raise him to the episcopate. Soon after, Kaminski was to be consecrated bishop by Vilatte, but this was delayed over the fee charged for consecration. It was deliberate and premeditated simony, the act of buying and selling an ecclesiastical office, Vilatte demanded $5,000 for the consecration but Kaminski only had $600 to give. One Episcopal priest reported that Vilatte charged a $15,000 fee for Kaminski's consecration. Only after Vilatte was bankrupt and had sold his house and cathedral in Green Bay was he less demanding and agreed to consecrate Kaminski. Kaminski was consecrated, on March 20, 1898, by Vilatte as suffragan bishop for those Polish priests and parishes which accepted Vilatte's doctrinal reforms. He received $100 in cash from Kaminski and promissory notes for a few hundred dollars more.

Two independent priests assisted in Kaminski's consecration: Kolaszewski and Wladyslaw Debski.

Kaminski threatened to take Grafton to court after Grafton publicly criticized him.

"Notices were sent out," according to Anson, that stated both Cardinal James Gibbons of Baltimore and Archbishop Sebastiano Martinelli, the apostolic delegate to the United States, "would assist at the ceremony. It is hardly necessary to add that neither of these prelates put in an appearance." Vilatte arrived in Buffalo on March 21, 1898, and consecrated Kaminski. However, the new bishop fled the United States to Canada because of creditors. He was excommunicated by Rome and he abandoned Vilatte.

Kaminski's consecration met with an immediate response from the Holy See when Pope Leo XIII condemned the ceremony and excommunicated Kaminski. The anathema was read out in Catholic churches on October 17, 1898.

Kaminski was consecrated after the 1889 establishment of the UU and its IBC, "the orders of episcopi vagantes in general, and specifically those of [...] Kaminski, [...] and of all those consecrated by them, are not recognized, and all connections with these persons is formally denied" by the IBC.

On September 9, 1898, Vilatte was excommunicated by the Syriac Orthodox Patriarch of Antioch, Ignatius Peter IV, for consecrating Kaminski in a way contrary to the canon law of the Syriac Orthodox Church of Antioch. Anson wrote that in his agreement with Alvarez, Vilatte acknowledged that if he "deviated from their Canons and Rules, he would be subject to dismissal from the dignity of Metropolitan." Bishops were consecrated by Vilatte "without authority" from the Patriarch of the Syriac Orthodox Church of Antioch, who "therefore does not recognize such consecrations or their derivative consecrations and ordinations."

For both Kaminski and Kozlowski, according to Kubiak, "their movements became isolated in the Polonia community, not so much because of the propaganda of the RCC, but rather because of the public opinion negative assessment of the associations of Polonia toward the dissenters." Kubiak wrote:

There is no doubt that in many cases, [...] the same followers and inspirers of the independent parishes were activists in [...] unions and [...] the Socialist party. In any case, in many instances independent parishes and groups of the Polish Socialist Alliance arose at the same time. The social postulates, [...] even the language of their propaganda, seems to indicate to a large extent a convergence in the two movements, [...]

Kubiak quoted Hodur:

Socialists reacted very favorably from the very beginning to the National Church movement for they thought that the movement would ease their access to the Polish people, but then they became aware that the National Church had its own goals and would not allow itself to be used as an instrument; the leaders turned from it and began to abuse it with yet a greater hate than they had to the Roman Catholic clergy. (Note: See Wieczerzak, Joseph W (Autumn 1983). "Bishop Francis Hodur and the Socialists: associations and disassociations". Polish American Studies. 40 (2). Champaign, IL: University of Illinois Press: 5–35. ISSN 0032-2806. JSTOR 20148131.)

Just before the Revolution in the Kingdom of Poland and wider Revolution of 1905 in the Russian Empire, Stanislaw Osada, in Historya Związku Narodowego Polskiego i rozwój ruchu narodowego Polskiego w Ameryce Północne, wrote in the United States, that Russian agents endeavored to draw believers into Old Catholicism, not for faith but for "implanting in the womb of Catholicism" (Note: A calque of the Polish idiomatic expression "zaszczepienia w łonie katolicyzmu".) the basis for Polish discord, to facilitate the russification of the Catholic Church. Kubiak quoted Osada: "There exists yet another danger, namely that in recent times the leaders of that movement (independent) quite unequivocally help spread among the Polish masses the slogans of the Revolutionary-Socialists." (Note: Edward Roslof wrote, in Red priests, that by 1905, renovationists in Saint Petersburg had an agenda for reform and joined with Christian Socialists to form the Union of Church Regeneration. "Orthodox adaptation of revolutionary rhetoric in 1905 disturbed the church leaders, who viewed it as incompatible with church teaching." Roslof quoted Sergei Bulgakov, that the reform "sought 'not only to renovate the church life, but even to create its new forms, almost a new religion' following the model of Martin Luther." According to Roslof, this "charge of creating a 'new religion' surfaced repeatedly.")

Over the next several years, Kaminski developed his Church. He ordained several priests. But he never managed to collect more than 35,000 faithful gathered in 14 parishes.

From 1898 to 1911 he edited and published a weekly Polish newspaper Warta, an organ of his independent church. He died in Buffalo on September 19, 1911.

== The consequences of the death of Bishop ==
After Kaminski died in 1911, the diocese was administered by a priest, Leon Zakrzewski. Kaminski's death led to the creation of the Polish National Catholic Church (PNCC), which was a member of the Old Catholic Churches' Union of Utrecht from 1907 to 2003.

Eventually, the Buffalo center of the independent movement ceased to exist and most of his parishioners affiliated themselves with the Scranton center of the independent movement. Some of the faithful Polish Catholic Church in North America who did not join the PNCC joined a separate Christian denomination and later took the name Mariavite Old Catholic Church in North America.

== Works or publications ==
He was editor of the following Polish language newspaper:

- Warta (in Polish) (Buffalo, NY). OCLC 859810176
