= René Vilatte =

French naturalized American Christian leader active in France and the United States

The Reverend Joseph René Vilatte
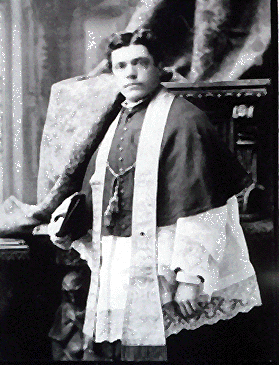
- Vilatte after his consecration in 1892
- Successor: Frederick Ebenezer Lloyd

Personal details
- Born: January 24, 1854 Paris, France
- Died: July 8, 1929 (aged 75) Versailles, France
- Denomination: At various points the Eastern Orthodox Church (Western Rite Orthodox), Old Catholic Church, American Catholic Church (ACC), and others, before being reconciled with the Catholic Church
- Parents: Joseph R. Vilatte, Marie-Antoinette Chorin
- Motto: Soli Deo honor et gloria (Honour and glory be to God alone)
- Signature: Joseph René Vilatte's signature

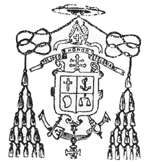
- Coat of arms: Joseph René Vilatte's coat of arms

Ordination history
History
Diaconal ordination
- Ordained by: Eduard Herzog
- Date: June 6, 1885
- Place: Bern, Switzerland
Priestly ordination
- Ordained by: Eduard Herzog
- Date: June 7, 1885
- Place: Bern, Switzerland
Episcopal consecration
- Principal consecrator: Mar Julius I (Antonio Francisco Xavier Alvares)
- Co-consecrators: Mar Athanasius Paulos of Kottayam, Mar Gregorius Gewargis of Niranam
- Date: May 29, 1892
- Place: Colombo, British Ceylon
Episcopal succession
Bishops consecrated by René Vilatte as principal consecrator
- Stephen Kaminski: March 21, 1898 (Note: Brandreth incorrectly dates this event as 1898-09-09.)
- Paolo Miraglia: May 6, 1900
- Henry Marsh-Edwards: June 14, 1903 (Note: A sentence editing error in Brandreth incorrectly names the principal consecrator as Paolo Miraglia.)
- Carmel Henry Carfora: 1907(?)
- Victor von Kubinyi: April 27, 1913
- Frederick Ebenezer Lloyd: December 29, 1915 (Note: Anson dates this event as 1915-12-19.)
- George Alexander McGuire: September 28, 1921 (Note: Anson dates this event as 1921-09-22.)
- Edgar James Sneed (Note: This person is not found in Anson.) (Note: This person is not found in Brandreth.): June 1, 1923
- Francis John Edmund Barwell-Walker: June 1, 1923

Joseph René Vilatte (January 24, 1854 – July 8, 1929), also known as Mar Timotheus I, was a French–American Catholic active in France and the United States. He was associated with several Christian denominations before his ordination in the Christian Catholic Church of Switzerland (CKS) as a bishop for service in an Episcopal diocese. Eventually, he was reconciled with the Catholic Church and voluntarily entered a solemn vow of abjuration.

Vilatte was at one point consecrated as a bishop by Malankara Church bishops, with the knowledge and permission of the Syriac Orthodox Patriarch of Antioch. After being expelled from multiple denominations, he was considered an example of an episcopus vagans, or "wandering bishop".

Although never a bishop within an Old Catholic denomination or sect and denounced by the Union of Utrecht Old Catholic churches, Vilatte became known as the "first Old Catholic bishop of the United States".

== Early life and conversion to Catholicism ==
Vilatte was born in Paris, France, on January 24, 1855. He was raised by his paternal grandparents, who were members of the Petite Église (PÉ), an independent church separated from the Catholic Church after the Concordat of 1801. Vincent Gourdon wrote that this independent church had about 4,000 adherents Peter Anson, in Bishops at large, says that Vilatte's parents were members of the independent church and that he was probably baptized by a layman. Boyd, however, claims that Vilatte was validly baptized and educated by parents who held Gallican beliefs. Some accounts say that Vilatte was born Catholic.

Vilatte lost his parents at a "tender age". Raised in a Parisian orphanage operated by the Brothers of the Christian Schools where he was conditionally baptized, he received the sacrament of confirmation in Notre Dame de Paris cathedral. His sister became an Augustinian nun, and was evicted from Montrouge, Paris, convent during the enforcement of the 1905 French law on the Separation of the Churches and the State.

Not yet sixteen, Vilatte served during the Franco-Prussian War in the battalion of the National Guard militia commanded by Jules-Henri-Marius Bergeret, a future member of the Comité de vigilance de Montmartre. He intended to become a Roman Catholic priest but, after the war and the Paris Commune, Vilatte emigrated to Canada. There he became a member of the Protestant Methodist Church in Montreal. He worked for two years as a teacher and lay assistant to a French mission priest. He worked as a catechist in a small school near Ottawa and led services.

After returning to France in 1873, according to Bernard Vignot in Le phénomène des Églises parallèles, Vilatte was called up for military service but refused to obey. He took refuge in Belgium. He spent one year in the House of the Christian Brothers at Namur. Vilatte emigrated to Canada again in 1876.

Vilatte spent a second year devoted to private preparation for the priesthood before entering, in 1878, the Congregation of the Holy Cross Fathers' College of St. Laurent, Montreal, Canada. Marx and Blied wrote that he spent three years at the College of St. Laurent and left voluntarily. In the interval between his third and fourth seminary years, Vilatte attended several anti-Catholic lectures by Charles Chiniquy, a priest who left Catholicism and became a Presbyterian pastor. Vilatte began to have doctrinal doubts.

Chiniquy, a French Canadian, was known as a gifted public speaker. Yves Roby, in the Dictionary of Canadian Biography, compared Chiniquy to French Bishop Charles Auguste Marie Joseph, Count of Forbin-Janson, of Nancy and Toul, in his "spectacular preaching methods", and wrote that Chiniquy's preaching produced "genuine religious transformation". Chiniquy was dubbed the apostle of temperance. Anthony Cross wrote, in Père Hyacinthe Loyson, the Eglise Catholique Gallicane (1879–1893) and the Anglican Reform Mission, that "some made a living by attacking the Roman Church and the Society of Jesus in particular"; he included Chiniquy among a number of excommunicated Catholic priests, such as former Barnabite friar Alessandro Gavazzi, who "became anti-Catholic 'no popery' propagandists" and "received ready support from Protestants." "Even some Protestants became indignant", according to Roby, at how for five years "Chiniquy conducted an unremitting campaign" of "unrestrained attacks on the Catholic Church, its dogmas, sacraments, moral doctrine, and devotional practices".

Nicholas Weber, in the Catholic Encyclopedia, wrote that Vilatte became an apostate chiefly due to the influence of Chiniquy.

According to Ernest Margrander, in the Schaff–Herzog Encyclopedia of Religious Knowledge, Vilatte was unable to continue his seminary studies and transferred to The Presbyterian College, Montreal. Two years' study convinced him of both papal additions to a primitive Catholic faith and defective Protestant interpretation of its traditional teachings. By contrast, Anson says there is "no record of Vilatte as a student" at Presbyterian College.

In an 1889 article, John Shea wrote in The American Catholic Quarterly Review that Vilatte was unwilling to leave Catholicism. He entered a house of the Alexian Brothers, and became a cook among the Clerics of Saint Viator at Bourbonnais Township, Kankakee County, Illinois. But he stayed only six months.

Vilatte became reacquainted with Chiniquy, who lived in nearby St. Anne, Illinois. Chiniquy advised him to begin missionary work among a group of French and Belgians in Green Bay, Wisconsin, who had abandoned the Catholic Church. In April 1884, he was appointed by the Presbyterian Church in the United States of America (PCUSA) Board of Home Missions as pastor of a French-language mission in Green Bay. He preached against the Catholic Church and distributed Chiniquy's tracts there and in nearby Fort Howard, Marinette, and other parts of Wisconsin. Although Vilatte did not succeed to any extent, according to Shea, he was ordained as a Presbyterian minister in August. When he made an addition to his chapel, he invited Chiniquy to come and dedicate it. This seemed to close his career as a Presbyterian.

Chiniquy introduced Vilatte to Hyacinthe Loyson, a former Carmelite priest who had been excommunicated in 1869. Loyson married in London in 1872. According to Cross, "Loyson was too profoundly Catholic to associate with such extremists." Marx and Blied identified Loyson as the source of Vilatte's interest in the Old Catholics' schism.

The Eglise Catholique Gallicane (ECG), founded by Loyson in 1879, was "the Paris mission established under the auspices of the Anglo-Continental Society with oversight of a bishop of the Scottish Episcopal Church" and "a bridgehead in a culture war which had been waged by Anglicans". The endeavor "was one of a number of Anglican reform mission interventions in Roman Catholic heartlands" among the culture wars that were being fought in Germany, Haiti, Italy, Mexico, Portugal, Spain, and Switzerland. William Ewart Gladstone, "played an important part in encouraging the foundation" of the ECG. Loyson collaborated with the Anglo-Continental Society (ACS) "in his effort to recall Frenchmen to the principles and practices of the ancient Gallican Church before it was corrupted by Papal innovations." The ACS was an ecumenical organization which saw the "hope of Christian Europe appears to rest on the progress of a de-Vaticanised Catholicism and a de-rationalised Protestantism."

"It was", Cross emphasizes, the Anglo-Continental Society "which master-minded the extraordinary venture in Paris which resulted in the founding" of the ECG. Robert Nevin, the Episcopal Church (USA) rector in Rome, "seems to have been present at every juncture in the planning" and "appears to have been, with [Frederick] Meyrick, the principal strategist in winning Anglican Episcopal backing." Although official Anglican support and "regular substantial financial subsidy" was withdrawn from the ECG at the end of 1881, it remained unofficially supported. According to Peter-Ben Smit, in Old Catholic and Philippine Independent Ecclesiologies in History, Loyson "was a source of concern" for the Union of Utrecht's (UU) International Old Catholic Bishops' Conference (IBC) because "the Dutch did not want to have anything to do with him and others could not." It was ceded to the archdiocese of Utrecht in 1893, although most parishioners were Gallican Catholics.

Shea wrote that, the Old Catholics' schism in the United States, originated with and was managed by the Episcopal Church (USA). Loyson directed Vilatte, c. 1884, to apply to Episcopal bishop John H. Brown of Fond du Lac, Wisconsin, the nearest Anglo-Catholic bishop. Marx and Blied wrote that Loyson was a proponent of the branch theory within Anglicanism when "Vilatte met Loyson", and Margrander wrote that Loyson wanted to personally talk with Vilatte regarding Catholic reform in America, and proposed that Vilatte travel to Europe for ordination as priest by a Christian Catholic Church of Switzerland (CKS) bishop, Eduard Herzog of Bern, Switzerland. In 1890, Loyson denied personally knowing Vilatte. Marx and Blied did not known if the two also met during Loyson's second, 1893–1894, American tour.

== Episcopal and Old Catholic ==
There were two notable missions in the Episcopal Diocese of Fond du Lac, one to the Germans under the leadership of Karl Oppen, formerly a Lutheran minister, the other to the French and Belgians on the Door Peninsula along the Green Bay of Lake Michigan, known as the Old Catholic Mission under the leadership of Vilatte. The Belgian settlement was spread out over parts of Brown, Door, Kewaunee counties. It stretched from the city of Green Bay, the county seat of Brown County, to the city of Sturgeon Bay, the county seat of Door County.

Brown's successor, Bishop Charles Chapman Grafton wrote:

Bishop Brown was singularly and specially interested in these two movements because they seemed to him to promise a practical solution of the difficult problem of how to deal with the question of Catholic reform among the foreign population drifting from the old moorings in the unrest of our American life.

A feature of area was the number of nationalities represented; Shea described the Catholic Diocese of Green Bay as one where the faithful were poor, scattered, and spoke too many languages. The bishop had to find priests able to give instructions and hear confessions in English, French, German, Dutch, Walloon, Bohemian, Polish, and Menominee, a nation of Native Americans living in Wisconsin. In a small congregation of a hundred families, a priest might find three languages necessary for the exercise of the ministry. It was not easy to obtain priests able to take charge of these missions, or to prevent their becoming discouraged when they found even the scanty allowance expected by a priest almost impossible. Grafton wrote that it had been said that nearly 70% of the population were foreigners or descendants of foreigners. Grafton also listed Swedes, Belgians, Norwegians, Danes, Icelanders, Bulgarians, Italians, Greeks, and Armenians. Grafton wrote that if the Episcopal Church was Catholic in its doctrine and worship it certainly could reach members of those several nationalities and supply their spiritual needs. The Episcopal Church planted in localities where most of the people were Swedes or Bulgarians or Belgians had found a footing and congregations had developed.

Brown had no use for Vilatte as an Episcopal priest, having no French Episcopalians for Vilatte to minister to.

A number of Catholics situated in Door County, who were mostly Belgian, had broken away from the Holy See and had taken the position of Old Catholics.

Brown laid the situation before the Episcopal bishops in council. They agreed to let Brown take charge of the work as bishop and permitted the use there of the Old Catholic liturgy as used in Switzerland. The intention was to form a type of separate rite within the Episcopal Church. Brown informed Grafton of these facts and Bishop John Williams, the Presiding Bishop, also, when Grafton became bishop, he confirmed this intention.

A pamphlet published in connection with Vilatte's mission admitted to what Shea considered as fraud and dishonesty; Shea quoted:

This course was decided upon on account of the religious prejudices on the part of the Belgians for whose religious wants Bishop Brown had selected him. If he had gone as an American priest among them, he would have been ignored as a Protestant minister. Anglican orders, particularly when derived from an episcopate officially styled "Protestant", are in disrepute with all Roman Catholics; the very name of Protestant is hateful and makes them shrink back; in short, they will have nothing to do with anything connected with Protestantism. On the other hand. Old Catholic orders, like the Greek, are held to be valid by them. The Bishop of Fond-du-Lac had the sagacity to see this and decide accordingly.

Hjalmar Holand wrote, in History of Door County, Wisconsin, the County Beautiful, that "the term Episcopalian was not familiar to the Belgians [so] he represented himself as Old Catholic, a term which is sometimes used synonymously", according to Holand, "and has a more commendable sound to Catholic ears."

Vilatte followed Loyson's alternative advice to consult with Brown. Vilatte "had joined the Protestant Episcopal Church in America."

== Priest ==
Vilatte became, according to their official record, a candidate for holy orders in the Episcopal Diocese of Fond du Lac. Vilatte entered the Episcopal Diocese of Milwaukee's Nashotah House seminary in Nashotah, Wisconsin. According to the Journal of the eleventh annual council of the Protestant Episcopal Church in the Diocese of Fond du Lac, he was recommended as candidate for ordination as a priest in April 1885; and in May, he was recommended for ordination as a deacon; but, the journal does not note that during the annual council, June 2–3, 1885, he was in Europe and would be ordained within days. An unorganized mission called Good Shepherd, located in Fond du Lac, is mentioned but not associated with a missionary by name.

Brown sent Vilatte to Herzog. (Note: Marx and Blied noted that although "it seems strange" this was not unique, John Henry Newman wrote about the Anglican-German Bishopric in Jerusalem, founded by the English and Prussian state churches and established under the Bishops in Foreign Countries Act 1841, in his Apologia Pro Vita Sua. "This was the third blow, which finally shattered my faith in the Anglican Church", lamented Newman. Newman wrote that Jerusalem was considered a safe place for an Anglican-Evangelical experiment and "if it succeeded, it gave Protestantism a status in the East, which, in association with the Monophysite or Jacobite and the Nestorian bodies, formed a political instrument for England, parallel to that which Russia had in the Greek Church, and France in the Latin.") Shortly after the CKS synod in Bern, Vilatte arrived with dimissorial letters from Brown. Herzog was advised by Charles Reuben Hale to proceed. Herzog, acting for Brown and at his request "with a generosity which should never be forgotten in the annals of the American Church", ordained Vilatte within three days of his arrival. This was done "under peculiar circumstances" "to advance the candidate to the priesthood more speedily than the canons of the American Church permit." He was presented for ordination by Hale, "whose share in this transaction ought also gratefully to be remembered". His ordination took place in Bern's Old Catholic cathedral in the following order: minor orders and subdiaconate, June 5, 1885; diaconate, June 6, 1885; and, priesthood, June 7, 1885. Vilatte took his canonical oath of obedience to the Bishop of Fond du Lac.

It was not until the next year, 1886, that his ordination, "at the request of the Bishop of Fond du Lac", is noted in the Journal of the twelfth annual council of the Protestant Episcopal Church in the Diocese of Fond du Lac. Without mentioning any dates, Brown said that Herzog, at Vilatte's ordination, "had pledged him to canonical obedience to the Bishop of Fond du Lac" and sent him "not as a missionary responsible to himself [...] but as a priest under the jurisdiction of the Bishop of this diocese." Brown then added Vilatte to the diocesan clerical list, as a missionary priest, and made "this public statement of the peculiar circumstances of the case". Grafton revealed years later, in the Journal of the fourteenth annual council of the Protestant Episcopal Church in the Diocese of Fond du Lac, that sending Vilatte to Bern "seemed [...] more expedient, as the Canons [...] would have compelled at least a year's delay in [...] Vilatte's ordination [...]"

Herzog ordained others in a similar way. Alexander Robertson described the case of Ugo Janni, in Campello and Catholic Reform in Italy. After failing to establish a self-sustaining mission in Rome, which was supported by the Anglo-Continental Society through "a committee of direction and aid" led by Nevin, Count Enrico di Campello, a canon of St. Peter's Basilica who resigned and left the RCC, turned to Arrone, in Umbria's Nera river valley, which seemed suited for re-establishing his reformation efforts. In 1889, Campello visited San Remo, on the Italian Riviera, as Robertson's guest where he was introduced to the syndic and "to many other persons of influence in the town" on his first visit. He visited a second time. "To secure as influential and representative an audience as possible, admission was made by tickets" to Campello's discourses held, with permission of the syndic, in the town theater. "All were, evidently, earnest students and followers of Mazzini", according to Robertson. Therefore, Campello argued that Giuseppe Mazzini's idea was realised in his sect, the Chiesa Cattolica Riformata d'Italia, although, according to Campello, Mazzini's philosophy was defective.

Those supporters, in San Remo, decided to establish an exclusive church in San Remo. Robertson wrote that a "fact in connection with the San Remo church is this. All its members gave evidence of their Christian knowledge and character before they were admitted; and their admission was only given in answer to their own written application." It included "men of education, position, and influence". Robertson added that "the English visitors, who reside there during the winter, have, as a whole, taken a lively interest in Campello's movement, and have extended to it their support." Although Janni was only trained by Campello and evangelized in Arrone, "the time had come for him to receive ordination" so he "would then be in a position to organize a congregation at San Remo and administer the sacraments." Campello communicated on this matter with John Wordsworth, the Church of England's Bishop of Salisbury, "who, after fully satisfying himself as to the candidate's fitness by examination and by other ways", recommended Janni to Herzog, who then ordained him.

As a newly ordained priest, Vilatte went to the tiny settlement of Little Sturgeon, Wisconsin, and secured a log cabin about 3 miles (4.8 km) south, fronting on Green Bay. He divided the log cabin into a dwelling section and a chapel section. This was called the Bon Pasteur mission, Little Sturgeon. (Note: The location of Bon Pasteur, identified as Little Sturgeon c. 1885 – c. 1888, is currently an unnamed place located in town of Gardner, Door County. It is not the currently named Little Sturgeon, an unincorporated census-designated place located in the town of Gardner, Door County. By 1925 this place was not mentioned. The mission's log cabin no longer exists. According to Curtiss, it was located along the shore of Green Bay about 3 miles (4.8 km) south of the currently named Little Sturgeon.) Classified as an "unorganized mission" in the Episcopal Diocese of Fond du Lac, Bon Pasteur was established in 1885 with Vilatte designated as the missionary priest taking charge on July 16, 1885. He received a missionary stipend. Grafton wrote that Vilatte was given charge of an Old Catholic mission, the property of the church and buildings belonging to the Episcopal Diocese of Fond du Lac. He was partly supported by funds from the Episcopal diocese, sat in council along with the other priests belonging to the diocese, and was visited by the bishop, who confirmed his candidates and was, like any other clergy, under the bishop's jurisdiction. It was listed as a rectory without a church or chapel or other property. Bon Pasteur was reclassified for one fiscal year as a "non-reporting unorganized mission" and did not report financial data. Grafton wrote that Vilatte gave exaggerated reports about his work.

Cornelius Kirkfleet wrote, in The White Canons of St. Norbert, that after he was ordained, Vilatte erected a church and parsonage midway between two Catholic parishes in Door County. In 1888, Bon Pasteur was reclassified again as an "unorganized mission" with Vilatte designated as the missionary priest; that year, 1888, the Old Catholic Mission supported one married priest with his wife and child, two single priests, and two students. This was called the Precious Blood mission, Little Sturgeon (Gardner). (Note: The location of the Precious Blood mission, identified as Little Sturgeon c. 1886 – c. 1900, is currently an unnamed place located in the town of Gardner, Door County. It is not the currently named Little Sturgeon, an unincorporated census-designated place located in the town of Gardner, Door County. By 1925, this place was called Gardner. The current Church of the Precious Blood was this mission's church building and is a GNIS named feature located at 44.8031°N 87.6198°W.)

A spiritualist church was also built in 1888 and became a frequently visited stop on a traveling mediums circuit. (Note: White Star Spiritualist Church is a GNIS named feature located at 44.7908°N 87.6212°W.) It is located within .9 miles (1.4 km) of the Precious Blood mission. Although it was admitted in 1888 as an "unorganized mission", the Precious Blood mission was reclassified for the first time as an "organized mission" in 1889, with Vilatte designated as the missionary priest taking charge, years earlier, on July 4, 1885; that year, 1889, the Old Catholic Mission supported two priests, one brother and two students.

Kirkfleet wrote that Vilatte's "'revised' religion spread rapidly in the peninsula" and obtained a foothold even in Green Bay. But Marx and Blied though "it never attained virility" among the Belgians.

According to Jean Ducat, in Brabançons au Nouveau Monde, Vilatte tried to discredit Adele Brise and her work in Robinsonville (Champion), but the Belgian colonists and priests continued to trust in the "providential work" such as the first free school in the area. Ducat wrote that the Shrine of Our Lady of Good Help became a place of Christian pilgrimage the importance of which grew steadily and contributed to maintaining the Catholic religion in a region plagued by heresy. Brise's reputed mystical visions became, over 150 years later, the first and only Marian apparition in the United States approved bya Catholic diocesan bishop.

In 1890, Vilatte proposed to Grafton to be consecrated as a "bishop-abbot" to the American Old Catholics and as a suffragan bishop to Grafton; but the PECUSA canons did not allow for that and, as Grafton had no authority to do so, he refused Vilatte's request. Grafton thought Vilatte was neither "morally or intellectually fit for the office" of bishop.

Being ambitious to become a bishop, after Brown's death in 1888, Vilatte applied to the Old Catholic Church of the Netherlands (OKKN). He claimed that he was elected to the episcopate by the Old Catholic families themselves, at a synod held at the St. Mary's mission. (Note: The location of the St. Mary's, identified as Dyckesville c. 1885 – c. 1900, is currently named Duvall, an unincorporated area located in the town of Red River, Kewaunee County. It is not the currently named Dyckesville, Wisconsin, an unincorporated census-designated place located partially in the town of Red River, Kewaunee County, and partially in the town of Green Bay, Brown County. By 1925, this place was called Duvall. The mission's church building no longer exists but its cemetery, Saint Mary's Cemetery, is a GNIS named feature located at 44.6599°N 87.7134°W. According to Curtiss, the name of the place where the mission was located was called Dykesville, Red River (or Riviere Rouge), and Duvall at various times. Dykesville, the first placename, was from the nearest settlement at the time the mission was established; Red River from the name of the brook where a battle between Indians and white settlers stained the brook red; and Duvall, the current placename, was from the settlement that later emerged in the vicinity of the church.)

The first time Vilatte sought to reconcile with the Catholic Church is recorded in an August 12, 1890, letter from Bishop Frederick Katzer, of the Diocese of Green Bay, to Vilatte, in which, Katzer wrote that Vilatte would have to publicly retract and make a retreat in a religious community. Marx and Blied wrote that "Vilatte wanted to function as a priest", so, "Katzer added that the Holy See would judge his orders and prescribe what theological studies he should make." Vilatte thanked Katzer for the letter and "remarked that he would prefer to see his flock Catholic rather than Protestant." Anson wrote that nothing further developed.

Grafton suspended Vilatte for six months after his council declared on March 31, 1891, that, in their opinion, "Vilatte abandoned the Communion of this Church and renounced its ministry."

Grafton consulted with Williams as to what he should do. Acting under Williams' advice, Grafton wrote to the OKKN Archbishop Johannes Heykamp of Utrecht that he would transfer Vilatte, if Heykamp so wished, from his jurisdiction to that of Heykamp. In this way the PECUSA would be relieved of Vilatte and not responsible for having any connection with him. Grafton pointed out to Heykamp that all the property of the mission belonged to the Episcopal Diocese of Fond du Lac and was legally held by it. In case of his accepting Vilatte, Vilatte would be obliged to leave this work and Grafton would appoint a replacement.

Heykamp wrote to Grafton that after he understood the situation between Vilatte and Grafton, he "had declined having any further correspondence" with Vilatte. The OKKN declined accepting Vilatte. Subsequently, Vilatte repudiated Grafton's jurisdiction and left the PECUSA, whereupon, according to PECUSA canons, Grafton deposed him. Vilatte witnessed the complete abandonment by his first congregation. The congregation of the Precious Blood mission was "unfaltering in its allegiance" to Grafton, as was Gauthier, and declared "the unity existing among themselves and their loyalty to the Diocese of Fond du Lac." When he left, Grafton wrote that Vilatte had lost the confidence of all their clergy and people.

=== St. Anne Colony ===
==== Sturgeon Bay seminary ====
In March 1887, Vilatte, pastor of the Precious Blood mission, visited The Independent newspaper office, in Sturgeon Bay, and informed the newspaper that: he had solicited funds for building a seminary and "secured several thousand dollars for commencing the work", plans were being made in Chicago, furnishings were secured, and "construction will be commenced in June". He was asked about his order and responded that the "order has a large number of adherents" in Europe and "is doubling every three years" in some of those countries. Curiously, the article did not mention the name of the order. In April, the Door County Advocate reported Vilatte visited Sturgeon Bay on April 25, 1887, to obtain a suitable location for the establishment of a college of his order. Although months earlier Vilatte said "construction will be commenced in June", by the end of May, the Door County Advocate reported, only that, he had "signified his willingness to establish a seminary in this city provided our people see fit to donate the required real estate", and that, a benefactor, who "will give the society other material aid if it is necessary to secure the institution for this city", donated 1 acre (0.40 ha) of land.

In July, land "which has been purchased by the donations of our citizens" for the college, was transferred and work was to start on buildings in September. The next day the city council permitted "himself and family" to reside in a vacant school building; he was to operate a school in that building until his seminary was completed. In October, he began visiting cities along the East Coast of the United States "in quest of funds with which to erect the proposed seminary". He was away for several months. But a week after his return from touring the East Coast of the United States, Vilatte shocked Sturgeon Bay. His "contemplated seminary" would not be established there but elsewhere, wrote The Independent, in an article titled "Can this be true?" which exasperated that, "[t]he reasons given for this change are so extraordinary that we are not prepared to accept the statements made without further testimony." Vilatte wrote to Chris Leonhardt, President of the Business Men's Association, the group which facilitated the land purchase and aided him, that,

Our intention to build in this city a college for students of our denomination was about to be carried out, but after mature deliberation we find it necessary, because or ill-feeling and strong antipathy on the part of some of your fellow-citizens against us and our work, to postpone the matter until better days, [...] on many occasions [...] members of our family who have been spending the winter in this city have been publicly insulted in the streets and other places, and you will see how necessary it is that we protect the honor and the feelings of our students from such unpleasant occurrences and to guard them from such sad examples of ill-breeding and uncivilisation. [...] Since a large property in grounds, buildings, library and other requisites for a seminary are offered us elsewhere, we can afford to wait. Therefore, [...] we are compelled, by circumstances depending upon the conduct of your citizens alone, to withdraw for a while from your place, which is the center of our operations.

His letter was seen as a deleterious depiction of their community. The Independent editorialized:

This city is endeavoring to increase its population and resources by inviting manufacturers and others to locate here. A seminary to accommodate a large number of students was about to be built, all preliminary arrangements having been made, but that seminary is now lost to us because, as its projectors allege, they have encountered "ill-feeling, antipathy, and public insults" from some of our citizens. That we should lose an institution which would have annually distributed thousands of dollars among our merchants, farmers and others, is bad enough but to have it charged that our bigotry, bad manners and uncivilization have driven away one of the very institutions which many of us are striving to obtain is a foul blot upon the reputation of Sturgeon Bay and will cost us dearly unless it is removed. (Note: For letters to the editor about the public reaction to Vilatte changing the location of his development project see "Rather a flimsy pretext". Door County Advocate (letter to the editor). 26 (51). 1888-04-14. Archived from the original on 2017-05-10. and Muldoon, P (1888-04-21). "The Old Catholics and the savages". Door County Advocate (letter to the editor). 26 (52). Archived from the original on 2016-03-04.)

Brown died within weeks of Vilatte's announcement, on May 2, 1888.

By 1889, his scheme was apparent and he was seen as a scoundrel; building a monastery or college, the Door County Advocate wrote, "at any rate is the talk" nevertheless "without ever accomplishing anything" substantial.

What would be thought of a business man who would strike a town and under the promise of erecting a manufacturing establishment obtain the necessary site from the citizens, and after obtaining what he was after, turn around and tell the duped ones that their society was not up to his standard? This is precisely what [...] Vilatte did right here. He induced our people to give him several acres of land for a college site, and after he had secured this he immediately sought elsewhere for a location, using his success here as a lever to induce other towns to do a little better for him. Why, if a man did such things in the transaction of ordinary business he would be branded as a fraud at once, and he might consider himself fortunate were he not arrested for obtaining goods under false pretenses.

Emma de Beaumont, wife of Father Ernest, the Episcopal priest who assisted Vilatte since 1887, wrote to the Door County Advocate that, regardless whatever Vilatte had said, nothing had been done "toward building a college elsewhere" since Brown's death "upset whatever may have been the plan".

[Brown] ordered us here, [...] from New York to take charge of the new college, and after waiting [...] over ten months, during which we suffered much, we were left by [... Vilatte]. [...] We have been the first to suffer from the many changes you speak of in [...] Vilatte. We have given our time and spent our money, and are yet patiently waiting for a new bishop. [...] It is also true that [...] Vilatte intends to convert Little Sturgeon into a monastery, but we consider the matter as one of the many utopias of his reverence, and do not see how he can do so without his bishop's consent. [...] we received a communication from [...] Vilatte which stated in effect that he intended abandoning the work, and immediately afterward he turns about and commences the erection of a new church at Dyckesville. So you see one cannot well put any faith in what he says, he is so changeable, not considering a project before beginning it. I think it is well that you should know that there is no college anywhere; that the bubble burst long ago, and that any statement made to the contrary is false. [...] Our furniture and other possessions have been packed [...], we are here waiting, wiser, but much poorer, for having seen the work of [...] Vilatte.

This project was never carried out and the land was returned to the donors.

=== Dyckesville ===
A second congregation, classified as an "unorganized mission" in the Episcopal Diocese of Fond du Lac, was established in 1888 with Vilatte designated as the missionary priest taking charge on June 1, 1888. This was called the St. Mary's mission, Dykesville (Duvall). By October 11, 1889, less than two years after his Sturgeon Bay seminary scandal, a church, 93 ft (28 m) × 36 ft (11 m), and a parsonage, 30 ft (9.1 m) × 30 ft (9.1 m), was completed, located on 2 acres (0.81 ha) of land including a cemetery. The Independent reported that Gauthier sailed to Europe where he would be ordained and that Vilatte received a letter from Heykamp "informing him that an [O]ld [C]atholic bishop will in a short time be selected to take charge of the [C]hurch in this country." He later received a gift of over 100 antique theology books, "many of them are more than two centuries old", from Heykamp and Jacobus Johannes van Thiel, of the Old Catholic seminary in Amersfoort.

Grafton attempted to remove Vilatte from the St. Mary's mission in 1891.

Herzog and Reinken's investigation concluded that Vilatte was an Episcopalian, according to Marx and Blied, Herzog wrote to Vilatte on March 24, 1891, and "ended his letter bluntly: 'I want to have nothing more to do with you'."

An anthology of correspondence excerpts was published, c. 1893, as Ecclesiastical Relations between the Old Catholics of America and Foreign Churches in response to an 1892 Second International Old Catholic Congress resolution. In Marx and Blied's opinion, this compilation was probably edited by Vilatte.

=== Russian Orthodox ===
Isolated from both the Episcopalians and the Old Catholics, Vilatte turned once again to another denomination. The text of a widely republished and translated 1891 document, purportedly from the Russian Orthodox Church through Bishop Vladimir Sokolovsky of San Francisco and Alaska, announced Vilatte's conversion from an Old Catholic confession of faith to an Old Catholic Orthodox confession of faith under Russian Orthodox Church patronage. It also declared that only the Holy Synod of the Russian Church or Sokolovsky can prohibit or suspend Vilatte's religious functions; and, states that any action contrary to the declaration is null and invalid, based on the liberty of conscience and unspecified United States law but without mention of Russian Orthodox Church canon law. (Note: See French language text printed in Parisot. See Brandreth translation into English from Parisot text; he notes "there exists no evidence that this is a genuine document and, indeed, its phraseology at several points argues against its genuineness". Brandreth cited this text as pp. 23–24; this text is also found in a modified copy of Parisot's original publication.) Sokolovsky "appears to have granted him some form of recognition", according to Brandreth.

In 1891, Sokolovsky visited Vilatte at the St. Mary's mission. Margrander wrote that Sokolovsky intervened, approved Vilatte's confession of faith and his official acts, and referred him to the Holy Synod of the Russian Orthodox Church. Sokolovsky was removed, soon after, in the wake of a series of scandals. (Note: Sokolovsky was no stranger to intrigue, Terence Emmons, in Alleged Sex and Threatened Violence, describes his less than four year tenure as "a series of scandals and lawsuits", assorted "criminations and recriminations" of "arson, theft, perjury, conspiracy, and bribery", three attempted assassinations, "bigamy, adultery, sodomy, and child abuse" centered around "himself and his church administration" and involved several related groups.) Harding also corresponded with Russian General Alexander Kireev. (Note: Kireev was a proponent of Pan-Slavism. John Basil wrote, in Cahiers du Monde Russe et Soviétique, that Kireev knew Yuri Samarin, Ivan Aksakov and Fyodor Tyutchev and shared their views on Orthodoxy. His works attacked nihilism, which he "considered to be a corrosive agent derived from West European religious decay and carried into Russia by revolutionaries" and were about "Orthodoxy in its relation with Catholicism, the internal development of the Roman Papacy, which he saw as a corrupt tyranny, and the place of the Slavs in world affairs." "It is important to be aware of Kireev's roots in the Slavophile tradition, because his views on Russian political and ecclesiastical life can be understood only in this context", according to Basil. He promoted the idea that the Western world "had fallen into a state of decline because it had emphasized individualism and separatism, and also because it relied on rational thought rather than faith." Kireev was a modernist who "was a tireless supporter of the Old Catholics, [...] He saw in this sect the beginning of a new Church that might serve peacefully as the foundation of independent Western Orthodoxy, but in promoting their cause he spoke again and again about how its success would be of practical benefit to Russian interests in Western Europe." He had a "quite unrealistic belief in the great destiny of the Old Catholics. This conviction produced an irritating effect on most conservative Orthodox theologians in both Russia and Greece who were suspicious of the Old Catholics because they were reluctant to accept the traditional description of the sacrament of the Eucharist." His Weltanschauung presuppositions included: "the need for a holy and indissoluble link among church, state and the people of Russia"; "the belief that special gifts had been granted to Slavic peoples"; "the conviction that the basis of Western Christianity was weak"; Kireev "rejected parliamentary and democratic procedures as unsuited for Russia"; for him, Western democracy exemplified "false illusions created by popular rule" and he "harbored a deep suspicion of formal juridical systems, because they threatened to substitute written codes of law and court systems for the traditional mores that guided the people." As a proponent of an absolute monarchy with unlimited imperial power, he was "against any effort to install a parliamentary or revolutionary form of government in Russia" and was an opponent of independent religion "where bishops were free to make decisions without acting in concert with the state". Basil wrote that Kireev's views were still popular with some Russians in 1991. Kireev's younger sister was Olga Novikov, "a well-known figure on the European diplomatic scene" whom Stephen Graham, quoted by Basil, described: "She stood for Russia, she was Russia." She was a close friend of Gladstone and rumored to be a Russian agent exerting a "foreign female influence" on him. She was his source for "information about Russian affairs, particularly in respect of the union of the Eastern Orthodox Church and the Old Catholics of the West." Benjamin Disraeli scoffed her as "the MP for Russia" in England. She, along with Baroness Natalie Uxkull-Gyllenband, encouraged and financially assisted Mathew, and according to Anson, one of them also introduced Mathew to de Landas.) However, "owing to the constitution of the Russian Church, Vilatte could not hope to obtain the episcopate from that source, or at least not without great difficulties."

=== Malankara Orthodox Syrian ===
While waiting for the Russian Holy Synod's decision, Vilatte also consulted with Malankara Orthodox bishop Antonio Alvares. Alvares offered to come to America and consecrate him bishop; Vilatte responded that he would travel to Ceylon. Anson believed that Vilatte did not want Alvares to realize the diminutive size of the schism. After months of waiting for a decision from the Russian Holy Synod, Vilatte sailed to Ceylon to receive the offered episcopate.

According to Marx and Blied, "several shady characters claim to have given him the information" about Alvares but Brandreth and others attribute Harding as the source. Vilatte "never had a sizable income" according to Marx and Blied but could accumulate money for travel. For example, the people of Dykesville donated $225 for his journey, and being elected bishop by his small flock (according to the records of the Episcopal Diocese of Fond du Lac, Vilatte had about 500 adherents), Vilatte sailed to Ceylon. There Alvares and two other Jacobite bishops consecrated him with the permission of the Patriarch of Antioch as Timotheos I, Jacobite Old Catholic Bishop of North America on 29 May 1892; Pinto, acting as the U.S. Consul, attested to the consecration. When news of this reached North America the PECUSA excommunicated Vilatte.

== Archbishop ==
After an investigation forced him to wait nine months on the island, Bishop Alvares, Bishop Athanasius Paulos of Kottayam and Bishop St. Gregorius Gewargis of Niranam consecrated Vilatte to the episcopate in 1892 and named him "Mar Timotheos, Metropolitan of North America", probably with the blessings of Syriac Orthodox Church Patriarch Ignatius Peter IV. Grafton thought they were deceived by Vilatte statements as to his relation to Grafton and the extent of his work. There are claims that nobody has ever seen the original Syriac language form of this document. According to Brandreth, no Syriac authority had authenticated the signatures depicted in a photostatic copy of a purported translation of the Syraic document. However, in a letter dated to 1987, Athanasius Paulose II of the Evangelistic Association of the East confirmed the consecration's authenticity according to a claimed successor of the Vilatte orders; and, Vilatte was also excommunicated as a bishop by Ignatius Peter IV in 1898 thereby confirming his consecration occurred.

Émile Appolis wrote, in Revue d'histoire de l'Église de France, that Vilatte was titled "Old Catholic Archbishop of Babylon" (archevêque vieux-catholique de Babylone) and his cachet was an archiepiscopal cross, with the motto Ex Oriente Lux—from the east, light. Likewise, Vignot included an excerpt, of Georges Aubault de la Haulte-Chambre description of Vilatte, from La Connaissance, in which Vilatte was also called the "Old Catholic Archbishop of Babylon".

For its part, the Episcopal Church, on March 21, 1892, having already degraded from the priesthood and excommunicated Vilatte, stated in its General Convention of the same year that it did not recognize his consecration as it took place in a Miaphysite church which does not accept the dogmas of the Council of Chalcedon. The Episcopal Church in the United States bishops declared Vilatte's episcopal orders to be void. The work in the Episcopal Diocese of Fond du Lac has gone on, Grafton had three parishes under three priests, where the Old Catholic services were continued. In all this difficult matter, Grafton consulted his Presiding Bishop and followed his counsel; they did not wish to further a scheme which would make Vilatte a bishop, nor did they wish to offend the Old Catholics of the Netherlands. Williams believed they had saved the Episcopal Church (USA) from what might have become a great scandal.

Returning to the United States and to his work in Door County, he ultimately moved to Green Bay, where he erected his cathedra. During this time, Vilatte used two church buildings: St. Joseph's church in Walhain, and St. Mary's mission in Dykesville. He no longer used the Precious Blood mission which belonged to the Episcopal Diocese of Fond du Lac.

A request was sent from Bishop Sebastian Gebhard Messmer of the Roman Catholic Diocese of Green Bay, Wisconsin, to the Premonstratensian abbot of Berne Abbey in Heeswijk, Netherlands, for priests needed to minister to the Belgian and Dutch settlers involved in Vilatte's schism; beginning in 1893, priests whose special mission would be to minister to their spiritual needs were sent. Vilatte "did not give up without a struggle" and "[n]umerous letters from him are in the archives of St. Norbert Abbey, some of them of a threatening nature, all giving indirect testimony to the fact that the early Norbertines were successful in stemming the tide of [...] doctrines and religious practices which were disturbing the peace of the Catholic Belgians on the peninsula." The missionaries succeeded, according to Kirkfleet, by "appealing to the native Catholic instinct of the Belgians rather than by refuting the doctrines of the apostate."

In 1893, Vilatte had a booth at the World Parliament of Religions in Chicago, although he was not an invited delegate. Carlos Parra wrote, in Standing with Unfamiliar Company on Uncommon Ground, that "Despite the spectrum of religious traditions and theological views displayed at the Parliament, not everyone was welcome as a delegate. John Barrows emphatically stated that 'the Parliament was rigidly purged from cranks. Many minor sects, however, tried earnestly to secure a representation, for which there was neither time nor fitness'." Vilatte was not invited. Barrows wrote, in The World's Parliament of Religions, that people sought unsuccessfully to use the parliament for propaganda. According to Parra, "a character like Vilatte embodied the worst possible nightmare about religious indifferentism for a Catholic mind. As a result, he was kept at the margins of the Parliament." He did not take an official part in it.

At this time, Vilatte began his dalliance with Polish Catholics who, dissatisfied with non-Polish priests, sought to set up an independent Catholic church at the urgings of the priests Antoni Kozlowski and Franciszek Hodur.

=== Green Bay ===
On February 23, 1894, Vilatte bought land and built a small frame structure, his cathedral dedicated to St. Louis IX of France, in the city of Green Bay that year. Later that year, the first convention of the American Catholic Church (1894) (ACC1894) appointed Vilatte as its ecclesiastical head "without arbitrary powers". Constantine Klukowski wrote, in History of St. Mary of the Angels Catholic Church, Green Bay, Wisconsin, 1898–1954, that the 1894 Green Bay city directory lists Vilatte's cathedral "as 'American Catholic'" and its officials as: Vilatte, archbishop metropolitan and primate; Anton Francis Kolaszewski, vicar general; Stephen Kaminski, consultor; and, Brother Nicholas, church manager. In 1895, C. Basil, SPB, was listed as rector of St. Louis's cathedral. During this time, Vilatte used three church buildings: St. Louis's cathedral in the city of Green Bay, St. Joseph's church in Walhain, and St. Mary's mission in Dykesville. He no longer used the Precious Blood mission which belonged to the Episcopal Diocese of Fond du Lac.

Shortly thereafter, reduced to penury, Vilatte traveled the East Coast offering the sacraments to, and soliciting monetary aid from, Episcopalians and Catholics, but was rebuffed; in some places he was driven away by the Franco-Belgian Catholics.

Vilatte sought a second time, c. 1894 – c. 1900, to reconcile with the RCC. In March 1894 he approached Archbishop Francesco Satolli, Nuncio to the United States, who wrote to Messmer that Vilatte wished to reconcile; the next month, Vilatte wrote to Messmer that he was preparing his people for reconciliation. More correspondence took place between Satolli, Messmer and Vilatte. Later that year, the Catholic Church offered to pay the expense of Vilatte's journey to Rome. His case dragged on for almost four years until, in 1898, Satolli wrote to Messmer that Vilatte was ready to reconcile. But Vilatte remained indecisive. Messmer "realized that there was no hope for a sincere conversion" and wrote to Satolli:

For the present, he has an asylum among the schismatic Poles, who will pay him court until he will be infatuated and foolish enough to consecrate one of them for the episcopate. Then they will cast him out, and being in such an extremity, he will probably have one more recourse to the Catholic Church, asking for money and pardon. But will it be sincere?

In 1898, the name was changed from St. Louis cathedral to St. John church and A. A. Mueller was listed as rector. On February 10, 1898, Vilatte signed over his cathedral church to the company which foreclosed on him; it sold the church to Messmer on the next day. Messmer's dedication of the church as St. Mary of Częstochowa Church, which took place about two weeks later, included a procession accompanied by a city marching band. Marx and Blied did not state the disposition of St. Joseph's church but wrote St. Mary's mission was lost at the same time. "Vilatte's cathedral was never known as Blessed Sacrament cathedral, as some claim", wrote Klukowski. Another mission was founded in Green Bay; it became the PECUSA Church of the Blessed Sacrament in 1908 and a priest ordained by Koslowski was placed in charge.

During this time he consecrated Kaminski and voyaged to Europe where he stop at Llanthony Abbey, to ordain Joseph Leycester Lyne, and "explained that he was in a hurry, on his way to Russia at the special invitation or the Holy Synod of Moscow" but that was improbable.

In early 1899, he was in Rome and most Catholic newspapers reported that he sought reconciliation with the Catholic Church instead of union with the ROC. Messmer disclosed that "Vilatte had admitted to him personally that he had never been in good faith" and both Messmer and Katzer advised the Holy Office to delay passing judgement on his orders to test his sincerity. A Congregation of the Holy Office Consultor, Father David Flemming, issued Vilatte's abjuration statement and a Roman Curia official, Bishop John Joseph Frederick Otto Zardetti wrote to Messmer that Flemming had the case under control. He made a "solemn recantation of his errors" February 2, 1899, but, according to Weber, he "relapsed within a short time" after he outwardly reconciled to the Catholic Church. Vilatte disagreed with authorities in Rome and as a result did not return to the Church; authorities would not recognise him as a licit bishop. Asa result, he did not take a solemn vow of abjuration and was not reconciled with the Church at that time.

By early 1900, Vilatte was in the Benedictine Ligugé Abbey, near Poitiers. "He appears to have told" the monks that he wanted to make a careful study of ordinations in the Syro-Malabar Church, so that he could convince the authorities in Rome of the validity of his episcopate. Aubault wrote a picturesque description of when, in the monastery, he met Joris-Karl Huysmans and Vilatte.

While living as a guest of the Benedictines of Poitiers, Vilatte did not cease his subversive, anti-Catholic activities, although conducted secretly. News of this reached Cardinal François-Marie-Benjamin Richard, Archbishop of Paris, who, on 17 April 1900, circulated a warning among his clergy to be on their guard against men who claimed to be ordained or consecrated by Vilatte.

==== Emery colony ====
The Advocate in Sturgeon Bay reported August 14, 1897, that Vilatte, living in Green Bay, had bought 160 acres (65 ha) of land in Price County, Wisconsin, and planned to erect a church and a monastery. "It is his plan to found a colony of his people about the church as a center, the immigrants to come from Germany, Switzerland and portions of this country. [...] He expects to begin operations right away and will have fifty families, in the colony before winter." Soon, according to the September 1, 1897 Milwaukee Journal, a Milwaukee German language newspaper printed a letter from Messmer warning people that women were soliciting funds using Messmer's and Katzer's names without authorization. They were seen and reported; when police arrived, "the priest who accompanied the sisters was called before the chief and questioned and cautioned as to obtaining money by any misrepresentations", according to the Milwaukee Journal. Vilatte felt the incident may have "left some wrong impressions" as they solicited funds, for developing the 160 acres (65 ha) of forest, near Emery, Wisconsin; as Vilatte noted, all within 1 mile (1.6 km) of a logging road.

"These sisters were in Milwaukee last week soliciting aid for the asylum, and in some quarters were denounced as frauds", he said. Then, similar to how the Sturgeon Bay seminary scandal began in 1887, he added, "we shall begin active operations within the next month" although "plans for the buildings have not been entirely completed as yet". He envisioned, "[t]he purpose of the church is to found a monastery" as an "agricultural brotherhood of the Old Catholic Church" with a seminary, and an orphanage to bring children "up to agricultural pursuits". A real estate agent working for the Wisconsin Central Railway added that, during his negotiations with Vilatte he visited his "large and flourishing congregation" in Green Bay. The agent said they purchased "fine agricultural land" covered with hardwood forest. Less than six months later, his diocese lost possession of its foreclosed cathedral.

=== Chicago ===
Vilatte acquired U.S. citizenship then returned to the United States. He settled in Chicago in 1902, and used a mission begun by Father Francis Kanski as his next permanent cathedra.

Vilatte used, among other publications, nontrinitarian Jehovah's Witnesses publications for his religious education; in a letter attributed to him, in Zion's Watch Tower and Herald of Christ's Presence, he said: "I do certainly believe that the 'little flock' will be an instrument by whom all the families of earth will be blessed; because all the churches are in a very poor situation and the world in great desolation."

=== Consecrations and ordinations ===
Vilatte consecrated Stephen Kaminski in 1898 as a suffragan bishop for Polish parishes that accepted his doctrinal reforms. The consecration was delayed over the fee Vilatte charged. On September 9, 1898, Ignatius Peter IV, the Syriac Orthodox Patriarch of Antioch, excommunicated Vilatte for consecrating Kaminski contrary to Syriac Orthodox canon law.

In 1900 he consecrated Paolo Miraglia, and the Congregation of the Universal Inquisition declared that both men had incurred excommunication. The International Old Catholic Bishops' Conference refused to recognize Miraglia's consecration in 1904.

Vilatte's later consecrations included Henry Marsh-Edwards, who was married; Carmel Henry Carfora, probably in 1907 but without documentary evidence; Victor von Kubinyi in 1913; Frederick Ebenezer Lloyd in 1915, who succeeded him as head of the American Catholic Church in 1920; and George Alexander McGuire in 1921. McGuire founded the African Orthodox Church, which never gained recognition from a major Eastern Orthodox church. The International Old Catholic Bishops' Conference does not recognize the orders of Vilatte, Kaminski, Miraglia, or those they consecrated.

=== St John's Home ===
Vilatte operated a private home for the care of homeless children, St John's Home, in Chicago since 1897. Claude Basil, known as "Father Basil", was in charge of this institution until three indictments, charging "crime against nature", were found against him by the Cook County, Illinois grand jury in June 1903. The indictments were based on accusations of three boys who formerly lived in the home. Basil was arrested. An inspector from the State Board of Charities investigated the home on August 6, 1903, after the St John's Home applied to the Illinois Secretary of State for incorporation. According to the report, the inspector went to the given address and found the house vacant but upon inquiry was directed to a different location.

A new two story frame building with modern conveniences was found at that address. Vilatte was in charge and assisted by two other men, "Father Francis" and "Brother Panchand"; the signatures of all three men appear on the incorporation application. "He informed me that the home was organized in 1897, and that its object is to help poor children who have no homes, no matter what religious denomination they belong to, and that the institution is supported entirely by donations and collections." They cared for eighteen children—17 boys and a girl, the sister of three boys. The inspector recommended that the girl, probably 7 or 8 years old, should be taken out of the home, which had no provision for the separation of the sexes, and placed elsewhere.

Furniture was moved in the day before the inspection, and consequently the home was in disorder, but the inspector noted the floors woodwork walls and ceiling appeared to be clean. Vilatte informed him that a doctor was immediately called in case of sickness. The children wore donated clothing and all those of school age attended the public school. Two boys were locked in rooms and the inspector was told by Vilatte that "they were doing penance for running away".

The report includes part of an 1898 letter from Grafton, about Vilatte's character, published in Diocese of Fond du Lac, a newspaper. Grafton warned about Basil in that letter:

Another co-worker whom he ordained priest under the title of Father Basil, is a renegade from England, having formerly been connected with the Reformed Episcopal [C]hurch, and who fled to America, being accused as his bishop wrote me, of criminal conduct with boys. His name is George Reader, and the authorities of Scotland Yard wrote concerning him, that, while they did not give information to private parties, they would do so to the chief of police of any of our cities. (Note: One or more of the preceding sentences incorporates text from this source, which is in the public domain: Grafton, Charles C (Oct 1898). "[letter]". Diocese of Fond du Lac.)

To further discredit Vilatte in that letter, which Orzell calls one of his "more vituperative public pronouncements concerning" Vilatte, Grafton also asserted "he was morally rotten; a swindling adventurer [...] reported to me for drunkenness, swindling, obtaining money under false pretenses and other crimes, and as a notorious liar" with "somewhat exceptional gifts as an imposter" and associated with questionable people:

He has been surrounded and had for his tools a small body of men, mostly ex-Romans whose equals in crime and debauchery are rarely found. His late secretary is now in the State prison. Another [...] is now the inmate of an insane asylum, [...]
I know of no clergyman in my diocese who has any other opinion of Vilatte but that his proper place is in the penitentiary. He belongs to the low class of criminals governed by inordinate ambition and insatiate greed for money and power. He has no fixed religious principles, as is seen from the course of his life.

Vilatte stated that Basil no longer had a connection with the home at the time of inspection. The board did not find conditions sufficiently favorable to warrant recommending for the St John's Home incorporation; the board recommended that articles of incorporation be withheld by the Secretary of State. He was tried on one of these indictments and found guilty of a "crime against nature" on September 30, 1903. At the time of the report, he was held in jail while his appeals pended. The Secretary of State declined to incorporate St John's Home. Basil requested "friends and acquaintances" back in Sturgeon Bay to send financial contributions, to Vilatte, for his appeal.

=== Des Houx ===
In 1904, diplomatic relations between the French Third Republic and the Holy See were broken.

In 1905, all Churches were separated from the State and authorized to form self-supporting corporations for public worship. Those religious associations (French: associations cultuelles) were designations given to certain "moral persons" or associations which, by the 1905 French law on the Separation of the Churches and the State, the French Third Republic, wished to incorporate in each diocese and parish to receive as proprietors church properties and revenues, with responsibility of taking care of them. They were based on the principle that the State should only recognize distinct religious associations, having corporate status, formed in each parish for the purpose of worship "in accordance with the rules governing the organization of worship in general". All buildings used for public worship were made over to the religious associations; in the absence of religious associations, buildings remain at the disposal of the clergy and worshipers, but an administrative act must be secured from the prefect or the mayor. By Article 8, it belonged to the Council of State, a purely lay authority, to pronounce upon the orthodoxy of any religious associations; the revenues were to be subject to state regulation.

One such group was the work of Henri Durand-Morimbau, a publicist, better known under his pseudonym of Henri des Houx. Durand-Morimbau, a university agrégé, first worked with Bishop Félix Dupanloup at the liberal newspaper La Défense. Pope Leo XIII realized the need of a papal journal through which he could communicate with the foreign press, and he consequently created Journal de Rome. Journal de Rome, inspired by the French Cardinal Jean Baptiste François Pitra and directed by des Houx, grew critical of Leo XIII's liberal views. The New Zealand Tablet describing Journal de Rome, wrote that, it "distinguished itself for its fierce denunciations of the Italian Government and its equally fierce support, [...] of the Papacy." In 1885, Pitra defended des Houx in an open letter but Journal de Rome did not fulfil Leo XIII's expectations and was closed. Des Houx then returned to Paris, where he became editor of Le Matin, a French daily newspaper, in which he retaliated with articles against the Pope and the Curia. In 1886, his memoir Souvenir d'un journaliste français à Rome was placed on the Index Librorum Prohibitorum. But he returned to Leo XIII's favor by publishing, in 1900, Histoire de Léon XIII, Joachim Pecci (1810–1878).

By his August 10, 1906, encyclical, Gravissimo officii munere, Pope Pius X stated that the law threatened to intrude lay authority into the natural operation of the ecclesiastical organization; Georges Goyau explains, in the Catholic Encyclopedia, that the Holy See feared that religious associations would furnish the State with a pretext for interfering with the internal life of the Church, and would offer to the laity a constant temptation to control the religious life of the parish. Gravissimo officii munere prohibited the formation not only of these religious associations, but of any form of association whatsoever "so long as it should not be certainly and legally evident that the Divine constitution of the Church, the immutable rights of the Roman pontiff and of the bishops, such as their authority over the necessary property of the Church, particularly the sacred edifices, would, in such religious associations, be irrevocably and fully secure."

The Catholic ecclesiastical authorities had forbidden the only kind of corporation which the State recognized as authorized to collect funds for purposes of worship or have the right of ownership for purposes of worship. The State considered previously legally-recognized churches, as no longer existing; and, in cases where no religious associations were incorporated, took over the property of the churches and turned the property over by decree to the charitable establishments of the respective municipality; in such cases, the Church lost this property forever. After the publication of the encyclical, des Houx supported a policy opposed to that which he held twenty years earlier in Rome.

On August 19, 1906, he started a press campaign, in Le Matin, titled: "France for the French" (La France aux Français). He wrote that the hierarchy of the Catholic Church were unable to save either themselves or churches and the faithful French must now do so; des Houx appealed, to all the faithful, for the formation of a "League of French Catholics" (Ligue des Catholiques de France), whose purpose was to preserve traditional worship churches, religious foundations and properties currently threatened by decommissioning of churches; the group mission was to facilitate the formation of religious associations. He wrote that the majority of bishops disguised their opinions and were forced to abdicate their conscience and their control; that priests were treated like dumb and terrified slaves; and, that they did not have the right to abdicate a wealth which was accumulated by the piety of their ancestors. By September 23, 1806, Léon Daudet ridiculed, in Libre Parole, what he calls des Houx's "schismicule".

The large circulation of Le Matin made the failed attempt widely known and drew public attention to the acts and the words of Vilatte; Le Matin and des Houx were unable to get people to take their religious association seriously. Vilatte was involved but could not keep des Houx's "French Catholic Church" viable, which des Houx had established in Paris, in the chapel of a former convent.

By January 1907, des Houx wanted to create a schismatic Church in Paris and recruited Vilatte, though Vilatte was believed to be supported by Aristide Briand, the Minister of Cults and one of the leaders of the liberal anti-Roman movement. At des Houx's insistence, Vilatte returned to Paris early in 1907. On February 24, 1907, Washington Times-Herald translated Vilatte, from Le Petit Parisien, as saying to the French: "You are suffering, [...] but you do not know why you suffer, because you are not clear-sighted and practical—because you are not Americans. But I am an American, and I am the man you want to set things straight for you."

Vilatte together with a few laymen founded a religious association in the Church Notre-Dame-de-Lorette, Paris that filed a demand to receive the church and its possessions. In the meantime he resided in the former Barnabite convent. (Note: Located at 22bis Rue Legendre in the 17th arrondissement of Paris. Now the Église Saint-Charles-de-Monceau.) A public Mass was partly celebrated in the convent chapel by Roussin, from the diocese of Toulouse, in the presence of Vilatte. Much disorder and tumult followed upon Roussin's appearance in the pulpit, which he was speedily forced to quit by missiles flung at him. Vilatte tried to quell the storm from the sanctuary but was also obliged to retreat. The religious association was "founded at the instigation of the Masonic government officials", according to Kirkfleet.

Vilatte's June 13, 1900, excommunication by the Catholic Church was renewed on March 6, 1907. Roussin eventually returned to the Church.

Around the same time, he was involved in another scandal. If Vilatte did not exist, wrote a columnist in Le Rire, he would have to be invented for the lenten vaudeville foolishness played out in his church; he satirized the incident of a bailiff, who, in the name of a woman who loaned 3,000 francs to Vilatte, presented himself at the chapel and seized Vilatte's personal belongings, including his miter and crosier. He wrote of Vilatte's humiliation—not even having a miter to put on his head. While the bailiff searched for property to seize, he also found embarrassment and shame; the church porter had brought a fourteen-year-old girl, whom he had met on the boulevards during Mardi Gras, into his room above the chapel. Snob ended his satire with the sentence: "Desolation of the desolation!"

The law was modified by a law passed January 2, 1907, permitting exercise of religious worship in churches purely on sufferance and without any legal title; and further by a law passed March 28, 1907, classifying assemblages for religious worship as public meetings, and abolishing in respect of all public meetings the anticipatory declaration required by the Law of 1881 which the Catholic Church refused to make. According to the Catholic Encyclopedia, by the end of 1908, the Catholic Church in France, stripped of all her property, was barely tolerated in her religious edifices.

Appolis underscores that, ultimately, without the patronage of even a single French episcopate and only a very small number of schismatic priests in service, the "League of French Catholics" completely failed. It is significant that the modernists, active at that time, paid no attention to the religious associations movement, according to Appolis. He concludes that, while Briand was initially hostile toward religious associations, he later only used them for a short time as a "machine of war" against the Holy See but saw little result and abandoned them. By 1920 diplomatic relations between the French Third Republic and the Holy See, broken in 1904, were resumed. This method was used until 1923 when a new method of administering church properties was inaugurated.

=== Vilatteville, Mexico ===
Vilatte was involved in at least three speculative real estate ventures near the Rio Grande. In each venture he sought out customers who would travel to and settle on land purchased from the venture.

In 1906, according to articles published in The Donaldsonville Chief and The Brownsville Daily Herald, settlers could purchase 20 acres (8.1 ha) or 40 acres (16 ha) plots of land from a 25,000 acres (10,000 ha) tract that a venture had planned to purchase near Raymondville, Texas. The Brownsville Daily Herald wrote that Vilatte traveled in a private railroad car with several investors. A. M. Davidson, a general immigration agent at Chicago for the Houston and Texas Central Railway, purchased 50 acres (20 ha) of land and the Brownsville Railroad donated 40 acres (16 ha) more, on which a monastery was planned, at the center of the planned settlement. Vilatte recruited settlers; one article said he would select the settlers and "see to it that no undesirable immigrants are brought in". He began calling himself "Archbishop Vilatte, of Texas".

In 1910, with a group of Society of the Precious Blood religious, led by Taylor, who had joined the society after his ordination, Vilatte went to Candelaria, Texas. From there, they crossed the Rio Grande to an area in the vicinity of San Antonio El Bravo in Mexico where they founded, on 18 July, a cooperative settlement called Vilatteville located on 50,000 acres (20,000 ha) in the Chihuahuan Desert.

Vilatte felt it was a blessing to live there. He wrote:

If God sees fit to bless our hard and arduous work of tilling the soil in Vilatteville, our harvest will care for the orphans and cripples, for the friendless and old people, who have no other abode in which to spend the few remaining years of their life, and educate a new generation for the struggle of the world. But our work will not stop there. The land of Vilatteville must be the partage of the people of good will and good fellowship. Be your own master, have your own home, take for your children and yourself a piece of the earth, and under the shadow of our institution, bring up your family, far from the corruption, the degradation and slavery of the great city.

According to an article published in the El Paso Herald, only actual settlers could purchase 10 acres (4.0 ha) or 20 acres (8.1 ha) plots of land along with 1 acre (0.40 ha) in the town of Vilatteville from what was described as a "back to the soil" settlement on land the venture purchased in northern Chihuahua, Mexico. On October 1, 1910, Vilatte sailed to Europe to recruit settlers.

Unfortunately for the settlement, the Mexican Revolution also started in 1910. After Porfirio Díaz was ousted from power and exiled in France, Abraham González, Governor of Chihuahua, redistributed the settlement as part of nationalization and agrarian land reform in Mexico.

Taylor stayed in Chihuahua for a few years where, according to Anson, "he worked with schismatic clergy who were being sponsored by Vilatte as a nucleus of a national church." Vilatteville was a precursor of Mexican schisms. Although Joaquín Pérez's 1925 Mexican Catholic Apostolic Church (Iglesia Católica Apostólica Mexicana) (ICAM) was dismissed as a "comic opera reformation" sponsored by Plutarco Elías Calles, Matthew Butler notes, in The Americas, that previously other schisms were attempted such as by Venustiano Carranza's revolutionaries and that Vilatteville was built in Chihuahua about 15 years before. It's unclear from Butler if Vilatteville influenced Mexican schisms but Butler wrote that Pérez was consecrated by Carfora.

Other groups also conducted operations in Mexico. Cross wrote that before the First Vatican Council, "the American Episcopal Church had supported dissident Catholics in Mexico. The reform mission of the American Episcopal Church, with its links to the ACS, is closely related to the growth of American influence and empire."

In 1911, another venture was "Uncle Sam City", in Socorro County, New Mexico Territory, with the Ascott Valley Land and Improvement Company of El Paso, Texas. On at least 10,000 acres (4,000 ha). In a full-page advertisement, in the August 26, 1911, issue of the El Paso Herald, the venture dubiously claims, among other things, that it "gives the first investors a 1000 percent profit within a few years" and "only an infinitesimal part of the water applied to lands in this valley is lost to evaporation" as well as "cattle are rarely afflicted with diseases".

== Founding the American Catholic Church ==
The name "American Catholic Church" was used to identify more than one unique entity.

Vilatte founded his independent Christian denomination, the American Catholic Church (ACC), soon after he was consecrated. According to The New York Times, Edward Randall Knowles was Vilatte's first ordination. The 1892 article called the two, Vilatte and Knowles, the hierarchy of the ACC. That ACC had a schism when Knowles desired to be consecrated a bishop. Vilatte wrote to The New York Times, that he had "been pestered with applications from clergymen of other churches for episcopal consecration". I "would render myself ridiculous", wrote Vilatte, "were I to proceed to consecrate Bishops in a hurry." Vilatte rejected Knowles' request and Knowles resigned. Vilatte explained that three canonical conditions were not met:

1. Vilatte was alone, "and the law of the Church is that there should be at least three Bishops to consecrate another"
2. Knowles was married, "whereas in all the Eastern churches a Bishop must be a monk"
3. Knowles was too young, he "has not attained the canonical age"

Vilatte complained against attempts to force him "to act against" his "better judgment" and declared: "I am, and intend to remain, faithful to the laws of our orthodox Church."

Vilatte was mocked, in The Sacred Heart Review, as being the "sole proprietor and General Manager of the new Old Catholic Church in America" confronted by a schism. While the "great 'neatness and despatch'" of Knowles' ordination was ridiculed and his judgment, for "resigning from his church because he can't be a bishop all at once", was questioned. "Knowles may ask, [what] is the use of having a [...] church of your own if you are going to let the rules stand in your way?".

Knowles was a Baptist convert to the Catholic Church, he graduated from Princeton University, studied Christian Science for a time, interviewed Lyne, corresponded with Alvares, Pinto, Herzog and others. He was prepared to sail to Europe to consult with Loyson, Herzog, and the OKKN about the feasibility or desirability of starting missions in America. He abandoned his trip and waited for Vilatte. They met in Philadelphia, and Knowles was ordained in West Sutton, Massachusetts.

On June 20, 1893, The New York Times published that Knowles had received a letter from Loyson. "The letter shows that the Old Catholic Episcopate in Europe have sided with [...] Knowles as against [...] Vilatte, and have entirely repudiated him."

The name "American Catholic Church" was also used, from 1894, by a group of Polish parishes, at first associated with Vilatte, which were organized at Immaculate Heart of Mary Church in Cleveland.

On February 11, 1895, The New York Times reported that Knowles was a guest at Holland House, London and was "a priest of the Old Catholic or Syrian Church" who will in Egypt "study the Coptic and Greek systems". It further reported that, "There is a feeling among the Old Catholics and others who sympathize with them that the present administration of the Church is not vigorous or progressive enough. Hardly any advance has been made since the consecration of Archbishop Vilatte [...] Negotiations were carried on with disaffected Polish Catholics [...] but they failed [...] through a lack of discretion and tact." It went on to report that the "facts will be laid before the Patriarch by Knowles" and that reforms will be suggested.

"In point of fact", Orzell wrote, "most Polish dissidents proved more willing to make use of Vilatte's episcopal services at blessings and confirmations than to accept his leadership and embrace his curious blend of Eastern and Western Christian theology." Margrander wrote that Poles did not accept Vilatte's doctrinal reforms so he withdrew his approval of their movement; he also wrote that Vilatte was convinced that their motive was a "deliberate defiance of the canonical authority" of their bishops, rather than reform, so he "advised them either to accept fully and freely the Old Catholic principles, or to return to the Roman Church."

Statistics about Vilatte's Old Catholic Church (OCC) sect showed its tiny size. Henry Carroll's The Religious Forces of the United States Enumerated, Classified, and Described, summarized United States Census data from 1890 to 1910. It showed the OCC had at most three ministers, five edifices and 700 members; Moreover, the 1910 United States census data showed that prior to 1910, the OCC disintegrated and ceased to exist; Carroll wrote that "a number of denominations, all quite small, have disappeared, including [...] the Old Catholic Church, and other insignificant bodies." Carroll's summaries did not list a sect named "American Catholic Church".

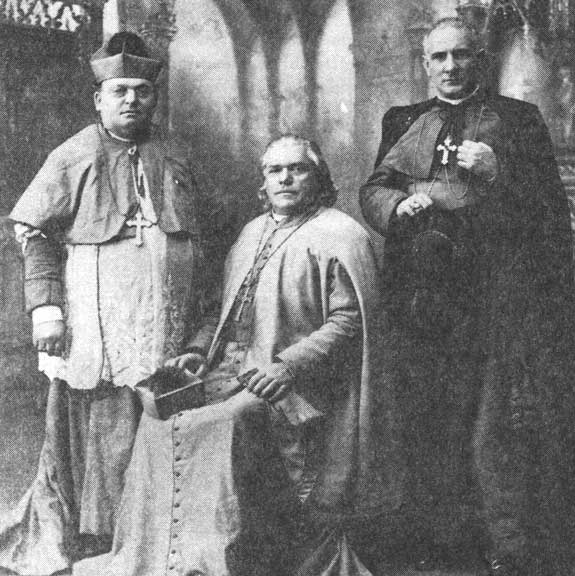
Bishops of the American Catholic Church: Stephen Kaminski, Joseph René Vilatte, Paolo Miraglia

In 1910, Vilatte founded the American Catholic Church in Buffalo. The council of oversight included Vilatte, Kaminski, and Miraglia who agreed:

- a council of churches open to all persons having their residence in this country, whatever may be their nationality;
- united in the fidelity to the true faith in our Lord Jesus Christ, who is the sole Head of the Universal Church and our High Priest;
- imbued with the American Spirit of democracy and liberty;
- a branch or section of the true (Christian) Catholic Church of God, with its own Synod and Conference of Bishops.

Partially self-reported statistics about Vilatte's denominations were included in the United States Census Bureau's Religious Bodies, 1916 edition. They show two denominations associated with Vilatte were grouped under the name "Old Catholic Churches". The report identified similar types of denominations, though not ecclesiastically connected, as the PNCC and the Lithuanian National Catholic Church (LNCC).

Of the two denominations under Vilatte's leadership, first reported in Religious Bodies, 1916 edition, the larger was the Old Roman Catholic Church (ORCC) with an episcopal see in Chicago. (Note: The "Old Roman Catholic Church" is also known as the "Old Roman Catholic Church of America".) Miraglia was associated with this organization. It was in close fellowship with the ACC but a distinct organization. Although some churches had been previously registered, the ORCC was not reported in Religious Bodies, 1906 edition. It claimed 12 organizations served by 14 ministers, with a membership of 4,700 with 11 church edifices and four parsonages. The organizations held church service mostly in foreign languages; principally Polish and Russian with others using Portuguese, Lithuanian, and English.

Of the two denominations under Vilatte's leadership, first reported in Religious Bodies, 1916 edition, the smaller was the ACC with an episcopal see in Chicago. It was incorporated in 1915 in the State of Illinois. Lloyd was associated with this organization. The denomination was formed for the special purpose of bringing Roman Catholics into the Old Catholic movement. It was in close fellowship with the ORCC but a distinct organization. It claimed three organizations served by seven ministers, with a membership of 475 with one church edifice and one parsonage. The organizations held church service only in English.

After Vilatte retired as head of the ACC in 1920, Lloyd was chosen by a synod of that church to replace him; that synod gave Vilatte the honorary title of Exarch. According to the Year Book of the Churches, 1923 edition, Vilatte continued as head of the ORCC.

After Vilatte's death, only one denomination derived from Vilatte was included in Religious Bodies, 1926 edition, in the report's Old Catholic Churches group. Religious Bodies explained that, by then, "none of these American bodies or leaders are connected with or recognized by the Old Catholic Churches of any part of continental Europe, nor are their Orders or Apostolic Successions derived directly, if at all, from European Old Catholic Churches" and added a "caution against misinterpretation" of the term "Old Catholic Churches". It identified the ACC and "its numerous derivatives" as one of three subsets of denominations in the Old Catholic Churches group. According to Religious Bodies, these entities are no longer either connected with Old Catholic Churches of continental Europe, which "repudiated all responsibility for or connection with" bishops who derived their consecrations from the consecration of Mathew, or with the Syriac Orthodox Church of Antioch.

"Of the many bishops that have been consecrated in this group, [...] most have assumed other names and titles and founded separate churches for themselves by civil incorporation. For most of these no statistics are published, for the reason that the Census Bureau collects its statistics directly from congregations rather than from the officers of corporations." So, "direct comparisons between the bodies as reported at the two censuses are impossible, [...] because of numerous organic changes", according to the United States Census Bureau.

The bureau also stated that "a reorganization since the census of 1916 makes it impossible to identify the whole group with any of the bodies formerly presented", in the 1916 data, under the name "Old Catholic Churches"; the reorganized ACC claimed 11 organizations served by an unreported number of ministers, with a membership of 1,367 with two church edifices and one parsonage.

A 1938 notice from the Syriac Orthodox Patriarchate of Antioch and All the East concerning schismatic bodies and episcopi vagantes, states that "after direct expulsion from official Christian communities" some schismatic bodies exist, including "all the sects claiming succession through Vilatte", that claim "without truth to derive their origin and apostolic succession from some ancient Apostolic Church of the East" and

[...] some of these schismatic bodies have with effrontery published statements which are untrue as to an alleged relation "in succession and ordination" to our Holy Apostolic Church and her forefathers, We find it necessary to announce to all whom it may concern that we deny any and every relation whatsoever with these schismatic bodies and repudiate them and their claims absolutely. Furthermore, our Church forbids any and every relationship, and above all, intercommunion with all and any of these schismatic sects and warns the public that their statements and pretensions [...] are altogether without truth.

The notice named the ACC specifically as an example of such schismatic bodies.

According to James R. Lewis, in The Encyclopedia of Cults, Sects, and New Religions, the ACC "was taken over by bishops with theosophical leanings" after Vilatte's death.

== Reconciliation and death ==
The Katholik printed that Vilatte returned to France in 1922 with some amount of money. What is certain, according to Appolis, is that money assisted in the election of the socialist Cartel des Gauches during the 1924 French legislative election. Vilatte had friends in the new majority.

In 1925, he returned to France for the last time. "It is possible", Anson wrote, that he hoped that Giraud or Jean Bricaud "would befriend him as the virtual founder of their sects". Following the election, the Catholic Church was very concerned about the outbreak of anticlericalism that accompanied the new majority. After conferring with Pope Pius XI and his Secretary of State, Cardinal Pietro Gasparri, Father Eugène Prévost was given the task of obtaining Vilatte's abjuration. Prévost quickly succeeded.

On June 23, 1925, La Croix reported that Vilatte took a solemn vow of abjuration at the hands of Archbishop Bonaventura Cerretti, Apostolic Nuncio to France, in Paris on June 1, 1925; and published his abjuration text. Vilatte wrote:

I, Rene Joseph Vilatte, declare that I express my most sincere regret for having taught many errors and for having attacked and presented under a false light the Holy Roman Church. Without reserve I retract all such teaching. I believe in and profess the Holy Roman Church, and I submit entirely and unconditionally to her authority, recognizing and confessing that it is the one true Church of Christ, outside of which there is no salvation.

In submitting myself, I regret and repent having received Holy Orders and having conferred them on others contrary to the teaching and laws of the Holy Roman Church, in which I hope, by the grace of God, soon to be received.

In issuing this formal declaration by which I deplore the past, I ask pardon of God for the scandals I have given and I promise to repair them by the good example of my new life, and I invite all those who have followed my errors to imitate my example. I make this declaration freely and spontaneously to repair the evil which I have done and the scandal I have given.

A week later newspapers announced that Vilatte, with an American boy-servant, was staying at the Cistercian Abbey of Sainte Marie du Pont-Colbert, Versailles.

He actually retired to the monastery on June 6, 1925, where he was neither permitted to offer Mass nor recognized as a bishop. He lived in a small house adjoining the convent, but with its own entrance on the road. In accordance with established Catholic practice, he was treated as if he had never been ordained; so, his only satisfaction, in Appolis' opinion, was dressing like clergy. In doing so, the Church did not assert that his orders were not valid; it just refused to discuss the matter. He wore a simple cassock "without any episcopal insignia". "Out of politeness he was addressed as 'Monseigneur'", according to Anson, and for the rest of his life he "led a quiet and secluded life in a cottage within the monastery grounds, waited on by his boy-servant". Years after Vilatte's death, M. Francis Janssens, abbot-general of the abbey, wrote:

Vilatte was some years in my abbey [...] He lived near the monastery in a separate house with his servant, an American boy. He never offered Mass. He prayed and read in his home and every day came to our church for the high Mass. He received Communion ordinarily on Sunday [...]. Cardinal Merry del Val, secretary of the Holy Office, had said many times to me that he was convinced that [...] Vilatte was a priest and a bishop. We always called him "Monsignor." He was very humble and subject to the Holy Father. He was buried in Versailles in the cemetery of the city. The funeral took place in our monastery church.

Anson wrote that there were rumors that Janssens offered Villate a home "at the request of Pope Pius XI" and gossip that Vilatte was granted a pension of 22,000 francs annually. According to Appolis the Roman authorities denied that rumor but it did not seem doubtful to Appolis that the Catholic Church gave Vilatte financial assistance that it often gives to converts. "Stories went around Paris that Pius XI had been prepared to allow Vilatte's re-ordination" but Vilatte declined the offer because he was "convinced that he was a bishop as well as a priest".

According to Kirkfleet, an article in The Salesianum about Vilatte "raise[d] a well-founded doubt about the sincerity of his reconciliation to the Church, and cites an attempt by him to 'ordain' a young man to the priesthood shortly before his death." (Note: See Marx, Joseph A; Blied, Benjamin J (Jul 1942). "Vilatte and the Catholic Church". The Salesianum. 37 (3): 112–120. ISSN 0740-6525.) According to Anson, Emanuel-Anatole-Raphaël Chaptal de Chanteloup, Auxiliary Bishop of Paris, wrote to Brandreth that, Vilatte secretly ordained and consecrated a novice at the monastery. "The ridiculous affair was kept quiet", wrote Anson, but others dismissed it as a rumor.

According to Appolis, Vilatte hoped that he would be allowed to say Mass at the time of his episcopal jubilee.

He died of heart failure on July 8, 1929, (Note: Appolis dates his death on 2 July 1929.) and was buried in a Versailles' cemetery, without episcopal vestments and with a requiem Mass celebrated for a layman. (Note: According to Appolis, Janssens ordered his body clothed in pontifical vestments and miter. The funeral was attended by few people, among them was one of the bishops he consecrated and two priests he ordained were among the mourners.)

"Shortly after the funeral both his American servant and his private papers vanished."

== Occultists ==
Eugen Weber wrote in The Historical Journal that by the nineteenth century, the Church's hold on everyday life had been severely weakened and, "[e]mancipated from formal religious observance, new believers sought new systems to replace the old, adopted the language of the old to present the new".

An extensive underground of secret organisations flourished in the ensuing religious anarchy following the dechristianisation of France during the French Revolution, to such an extent that the 19th century could be characterised as,

rife with superstition, with occult cults, with counter religions. All had existed before 1789; now the difficulties of orthodox religion gave them a chance to flourish – no longer underground, but visibly, at all levels of society.

Joanne Pearson describes, in Wicca and the Christian Heritage, these "cults and counter religions" as often "combining heterodox Christianity, occultism, Freemasonry and spiritualism", and considers the Johannite Church (Église Johannite des Chrétiens Primitifs) founded by Bernard-Raymond Fabré-Palaprat as an exemplar of sects that were revivals of heresy; they were linked with "gnosis such as Catharism and the Templars, and sought to return to the simplicity of an imagined primitive Christianity." Pearson notes the Johannite Church attracted lapsed Catholic bishops and priests. The paradox of 19th century French religious revival, alongside anti-clericalism and irreligion, is characterised by David Blackbourn, in Comparative Studies in Society and History, as "a patchwork affair that took place alongside widespread dechristianization". (Note: Pearson noted Marian devotions in France grew rapidly in the 19th century, as did religious orders, particularly for females. Roman Catholic approved Marian apparitions were recorded in Paris, La Salette, Lourdes, and Pontmain. Nearly 400 female orders were established by 1880, with 135,000 female religious in 1878.)

According to Massimo Introvigne, in Aleister Crowley and Western Esotericism, Vilatte is "grandfather" of hundreds of episcopi vagantes and a "key figure" in the subculture history. He explains that after Bricaud, "in contact with all the European occult underground of his time", was consecrated by Giraud interest in occultism grew in Gnostic Churches which consecrated Freemasons and occultists as bishops. For example, Bricaud consecrated Theodor Reuss of Ordo Templi Orientis (O.T.O.).

René Guénon called Bricaud, in Theosophy, an occultist and wrote that Bricaud's presence among the Eglise Catholique Française (ECF) operatives "is an example of the relations that exist between a throng of groups that at first glance one might believe to be complete strangers to one another". According to Guénon, the ECF "seems to have had only an ephemeral existence" but was unambiguously linked to Theosophists. He quoted Annie Besant, from The Theosophist, who described "the little known movement called the Old Catholic" as a "living, Christian, Church." The English edition of Guénon notes that, in Russia, the term Living Church "was meant to denote a 'modernist' organization set up with aid of the Bolshevik government in order to compete with the Orthodox Church, the intended implication being that the Orthodox Church, by contrast, must be considered a 'dead Church'. Doubtless", Guénon's editor thought, "Besant had precisely the same intention regarding the Roman Catholic Church."

Bricaud was consecrated as Tau Johannes, Gnostic Bishop of Lyon, in 1901. He was previously involved with the Sanctuaire Intérieur du Carmel Elié of Eugène Vintras (also known as Pierre-Michel-Elie) and Fabre-Paliprat's Eglise Johannites des Chretiens Primitifs Joined the Martinist Order.

On June 21, 1907, Vilatte ordained Louis-Marie-François Giraud, an ex-Trappist monk but then a ceremonial magician associated with the Universal Gnostic Church.

Bricaud was consecrated by Giraud, on July 21, 1913, into the Vilatte stream.

== Vilatte orders ==
The awards or decorations associated Vilatte include the Order of the Crown of Thorns (OCT) and the Order of the Lion and the Black Cross (OLBC). Both are condemned by the Holy See and Italy lists both as illegal decorations. The International Commission on Orders of Chivalry (ICOC) includes a list of ecclesiastical decorations in its Register since 1998, which only "possess full validity as awards of merit or honours within the respective Churches which have instituted them" but excludes bodies "which are often created as a purely private initiative, and which subsequently place themselves under the 'protection' of a Patriarchal See or Archbishopric." Neither the OCT or OLBC are found in the ICOC Register.

=== Order of the Crown of Thorns ===
Louis-François Girardot and Vilatte originated a pair of OCT groups. The two separately founded OCT orders had the same name but different origins and were combined, although it is not clear what that meant. The San Luigi organization says that the orders were inspired by the Ordre du Genest, founded by King Louis IX of France, and also that "it is not asserted that there is a continuous and historically verifiable link between the present-day Order and these bodies."

There are two separate foundation stories for the OCT; one in 1883, the other in 1891. These foundation stories were not believed by some during Vilatte's lifetime; Guénon wrote that "dignitaries of this Church have a mania for titles of nobility as others have for fantastic decorations; thus [... Vilatte] invented the 'Order of the Crown of Thorns'." The organization acknowledges the lack of verifiable facts about the monastery but says that some documents were destroyed in a house fire in 1918 and other documents were seized by the Vatican in 1929 after Vilatte's death.

In 1957, Girardot recanted his 1883 foundation story.

==== 1883 foundation story ====
The OCT was reputedly founded in 1883. According to the San Luigi organization, after the French protectorate of Tunisia was established in 1881, France sought to colonize the Ottoman Empire's Fezzan province as part of the Scramble for Africa. A small group of monks settled in Ghadames in 1883. The organization says that there is no documentation about their past. It is unclear if the monastery was a satellite of a mother abbey, if it was ever considered stable enough and large enough to be elevated to the rank of an abbey, if they had the canonically required number of twelve monks to elect an abbot, if his election received the approbation of their provincial prior, if after his ecclesiastical confirmation he received abbatial blessing from any bishop in communion with the Holy See, or even if any of their actions were sanctioned at all.

Nevertheless, the monks called their monastery the Abbey-Principality of San Luigi and they claimed sovereignty, as a theocracy, over the surrounding secular territory. Disease was endemic; attempts to convert the local Muslim population to Catholicism were rejected; and in less than a year, on August 2, 1884, the monastery was sacked and at least one monk was murdered. Five monks, including what the organization calls their third abbot, José Mendoza, survived and were exiled. Mendoza was somehow elected by less than the canonically required twelve monks. Without mentioning the Sahara and Sahel situated between Ghadames and the Sudd, the organization says that the monks traveled across the Sudd and arrived in the Kingdom of Bunyoro-Kitara on March 15, 1885.

There, the organization says, Omukama Kabarega of Bunyoro granted territory to the monks to settle and establish a monastery. The organization says that Kabarega conferred a title, Mukungu of the Chieftainship of the Ancient Abbey-Principality of San Luigi, upon Mendoza. In 1888, all the monks died from an epidemic, except Mendoza, who then abandoned the monastery in Bunyoro and returned to Europe. The organization says that "legalization by a French government official established the recognition of the Abbey-Principality by the French state" when Seine-Port Mayor Eugène Clairet was involved in a transfer of titles from Mendoza to Girardot. On May 7, 1899, again with Clairet's involvement, Girardot transferred those Mendoza titles to Vilatte.

The organization says that the monastery, of at least seven monks, "was constitutionally independent as a theocratic state" and a "colonising power" under which "the local population had no political rights whatsoever" and "were to be subjugated under the absolute rule" of the monastery. The organization confers reputed titles of nobility The organization also describes itself as an Old Catholic church. The organization believes itself to be the legitimate de jure government-in-exile of its former territory in the Fezzan. "The Abbey-Principality aims ultimately to secure the territorial restoration of the original Abbey-Principality in Libya, but is aware that political and related considerations are likely to preclude this objective for the time being". The organization also believes that it is also theoretically empowered to open embassies although it has not done so as yet.

==== 1891 foundation story ====
The OCT was also allegedly founded in 1891 and authorized by Ignatius Peter IV of Antioch. The ICOC asserts that because "none of the Eastern Orthodox Patriarchal Sees possess any type of direct Sovereignty, [...] the decorations instituted by them may not be deemed as equivalent to those bestowed by the Roman Pontiff not only in his Spiritual Capacity but also in his temporal position as Sovereign of the Vatican City State." "Protection is an attribute of Sovereignty, which none of these Sees actually posses", according to the ICOC.

=== Order of the Lion and the Black Cross ===
==== Valensi affair ====
The Valensi affair was a scandal in 1910s France, named after Guillaume Valensi. It resulted in arrests and convictions for fraud and trafficking illegal decorations. Documents and blank diplomas of decorations of various orders were seized which included a number of blanks printed in Arabic and others bearing what purported to be, the signatures of living and dead prominent French statesmen. Five men were placed on trial, excluding Valensi, who was judged to be not mentally competent. The investigation was begun after a client became suspicious of the authenticity of the signatures on the diploma of the Tunisian order of Nichan Iftikhar that he purchased and reported the whole affair.

Valensi and an accomplice were arrested on charges of fraud and trafficking illegal decorations. According to The New York Times, the Berliner Lokal-Anzeiger reported that the trafficking in decorations scandal spread as far as Berlin were many well-known persons were decorated. As it spread, searches were carried out against Valensi and his accomplices which led to several arrests and the revelation that duped officials in Lille had been "hoaxed in the most complete and amusing manner" by Valensi and two accomplices into thinking that they were Moorish notables.

Vilatte was implicated in the Valensi affair by being identified as the Marie Timothée of the Principality of San Luigi, whose signature appeared on diplomas of the OLBC trafficked by Valensi. Vilatte responded to a Le Catholique Français article about the diploma by saying that the article discredited him by incorrectly identifying him as the signatory. He denied having any thing to do with the published diploma, Valensi, or with the OLBC. He said that his OCT had nothing in common with the diploma from the Principality of San Luigi. Vilatte said that his religious name was Mar Timothéus I and not Marie Timothée.

In 1913 La Revue critique des idées et des livres printed an article about the Valensi affair based on Maurice Pujo's Pourquoi l'on a étouffé l'affaire Valensi, which connected it to organized crime. Pujo listed another Vilatte-affiliated group, the Grand Prix Humanitarian of France and the Colonies, networked with a Georges Brassard conglomerate which included the make-believe Free State of Counani. According to seized documents, Valensi was Chancellor to the Consul-General in Paris for the make-believe state. Pujo included an excerpt from a letter written by Collet, secretary of most Brassard companies, to Adolphe Brézet, "president of the Free State of Counani", which stated that Brézet would receive, among several blank diplomas sent to him, a blank "officer of San Luigi" diploma.

=== Condemnation by the Catholic Church ===
The Holy See had stated twice, first in 1953 and again in 1970, that it does not recognize either of the orders. Guy Stair Sainty wrote that an "increasing number of such bodies" troubled the Holy See which "issued statements condemning such 'Orders'" in 1935, 1953, 1970 and 1976. He noted that the "most complete recent condemnation" was included in Orders of Knighthood, Awards and the Holy See, by Archbishop Igino Eugenio Cardinale. The self-styled orders are described as "originating from private initiatives and aiming at replacing the legitimate forms of chivalric awards". The statement points out that, they "take their name from" extinct Orders or "which had been planned but were never realized or, ... which are truly fictitious and have no historical precedent at all."

While they "style themselves as autonomous", these "private initiatives" qualify their names, according to the statement, with terms to "increase the confusion of those who are not aware of the true history of Orders of Knighthood and of their juridical condition." For example, "these alleged Orders claim for themselves ... such titles as ... Chivalric, ... Sovereign, Nobiliary, Religious, ..." "Among these private initiatives, which in no way are approved of or recognized by the Holy See, one can find alleged Orders such as" The Crown of Thorns and Lion of the Black Cross. The statement explains that, "to avoid equivocations ... because of the abuse of pontifical and ecclesiastical documents, ... and to put an end to the continuation of such abuses, entaling [sic] harmful consequences for people in good faith, we ... declare that the Holy See does not recognize the value of the certificates and insignia conferred to the above-named alleged Orders."

== Recognition of ordinations ==
Vilatte was ordained prior to the 1889 establishment of the Old Catholic Churches' Union of Utrecht and its IBC.

From its inception, the IBC decided "to act as a body whenever the Old Catholic Churches of the Union of Utrecht were confronted with questions pertaining to relationships with other churches" and as an outcome formalized its decisions as well as refined its view of episcopacy. Peter-Ben Smit wrote, in Old Catholic and Philippine Independent Ecclesiologies in History, that the IBC denied the claims of those "who claimed to be Old Catholic bishops" and those "who claimed Old Catholic credentials" on a number of principles such as: "bishops have to be bishops of a church in order to be truly bishops" and "bishops should act in accordance with the IBC as far as consecration of further bishops and contacts with other churches." As repercussion, according to Smit, bishops who do not live up to their commitment cease to be members of the IBC. Citing various official Old Catholic works, Smit further wrote that, "the orders of episcopi vagantes in general, and specifically those of Vilatte, Donkin, Kaminski, Miraglia, and of all those consecrated by them, are not recognized, and all connections with these persons is formally denied."

According to Anson, the Bayerischer Kurier published a CKS statement on June 23, 1925, that "Vilatte had never been a priest of this body nor any other genuine Old Catholic Church". Cerretti's reply to that CKS statement was published in the July 11, 1925, Bayerischer Kurier. Cerretti wrote that regardless of the CKS's denial, the documents show that Vilatte was ordained by Herzog in Bern and was consecrated by "three Jacobite Bishops" in Colombo. Anson thought Vilatte "must have been pleased that he had managed to convince" Cerretti "of the facts of his priesthood and episcopate, even though they were irregular".

Vilatte wanted the Catholic Church to evaluate his orders but it would not. After his 1899 recantation, Vilatte was not assigned any post in the Church which would imply a definite acknowledgment of his priestly character. Anson wrote that "stories went around Paris", after his 1925 recantation, that the pope was "prepared to allow Vilatte's ordination to the priesthood sub conditione, but that he had refused the papal offer, being convinced that he was a bishop as well as a priest." "The pope agreed to let Vilatte be ordained a priest, but that offer was refused", wrote Marx and Blied. "If this proposal was really made, a vexing question about Old Catholic orders is raised. Lack of data precludes any discussion." "In practice, the Church ignores orders received by apostates from schismatic bishops", wrote William Whalen, in Faiths For the Few. "These men, if reconciled to the Church, need not recite the Divine Office or even observe celibacy." "No formal pronouncement on the validity of his orders was ever made by the Roman authorities." According to Marx and Blied, Merry del Val's opinion was that Vilatte was a genuine bishop. But Merry del Val "maintained that throughout his episcopal career Vilatte had so 'commercialized' ordinations and consecrations, that he himself was not able to regard them [those which Vilatte conferred] as valid."

== Works or publications ==
Most works by Vilatte are not readily accessible. Based on WorldCat searches, some are only a single holding at one library.

- Catéchisme Catholique (in French). Philadelphia: Bryson. 1886. OCLC 62778210.
- A sketch of the belief of the Old Catholics (pamphlet). Dyckesville, Wisconsin: [Monastery of the Precious Blood]. 1890. OCLC 770702161.
- Documents proving the validity of the Episcopal Consecration of S. Renatus, Archbishop Vilatte (pamphlet). London: Hunt, Barnard. 1901. OCLC 774559251.
- An Encyclical to All Bishops Claiming To Be of the Apostolic Succession (pamphlet). [s.l.]: [s.n.] 2009. OCLC 10986188. Archived from the original on 2009-11-12.
