= Vilatte orders =

The Vilatte orders are awards or decorations associated with Joseph René Vilatte which include the Order of the Crown of Thorns (OCT) and the Order of the Lion and the Black Cross (OLBC). Both are condemned by the Holy See and Italy lists both as illegal decorations. (Note: A 1981 Italian law punishes violators who use honors with a fine of up to L. 2,500,000 (€ 1,291.14); and punishes violators who confer honors with imprisonment from six months to two years and a fine from L. 1,250,000 (€ 645.57) to L. 2,500,000 (€ 1,291.14).)

The International Commission on Orders of Chivalry (ICOC) includes a list of ecclesiastical decorations in its register since 1998, which only "possess full validity as awards of merit or honours within the respective Churches which have instituted them" but excludes bodies "which are often created as a purely private initiative, and which subsequently place themselves under the 'protection' of a Patriarchal See or Archbishopric." Neither the OCT or OLBC are found in the ICOC Register. The ICOC suggests to authorities "to use more proper terms for any future creations of awards" and states it should be "clearly understood that the decorations [...] are not considered by the Commission to be Chivalric in nature even though several may use the term 'Order' in their styles and imitate Chivalric titles."

== Order of the Crown of Thorns ==
The awards associated with Vilatte include those named The Chivalrous and Religious Order of the Crown of Thorns (OCT) (L'Ordre Souverain, Chevaleresque, Nobilaire et Religieux de la Couronne d'Epines), The Sovereign, Knightly and Noble Order of the Lion and the Black Cross (OLBC) (L'Ordre Souverain, Chevaleresque, et Noble du Lion et de Croix Noire (OLCN)).

Louis-François Girardot and Vilatte originated a pair of OCT groups. The two separately founded OCT orders had the same name but different origins and were combined, although it is not clear what that meant. The San Luigi organization says that the orders were inspired by the Ordre du Genest, founded by King Louis IX of France, and also that "it is not asserted that there is a continuous and historically verifiable link between the present-day Order and these bodies."

=== 1883 foundation story ===
The OCT was reputedly founded in 1883. According to the San Luigi organization, after the French protectorate of Tunisia was established in 1881, France sought to colonize the Ottoman Empire's Fezzan province as part of the Scramble for Africa.

A small group of French and Spanish Benedictine monks settled in Ghadames on August 25, 1883. Ghadames society in the 1800s is described by Ulrich Harmann, in Die Welt des Islams, as a city with "customary law and administration" with "the norms" established and observed "by the assemblies of the various sub-tribes and codified in ittifaqat" and sharia. Fezzan was not a terra nullius; Richard Brookes described, in Brookes' General Gazetter Abridged, 1796 edition, that Fezzan was "a kingdom in Africa". The organization says that there is no documentation and that, "It is possible that some had been associated with the former Ligugé Abbey, which had been closed in 1880 with most of the members of the community then moving to Silos Abbey in Spain." It is unclear if the monastery was a satellite of a mother abbey, if it was ever considered stable enough and large enough to be elevated to the rank of an abbey, if they had the canonically required number of twelve monks to elect an abbot, if his election received the approbation of their provincial prior, if after his ecclesiastical confirmation he received abbatial blessing from any bishop in communion with the Holy See, or even if any of their actions were sanctioned at all. Nevertheless, the monks called their monastery the Abbey-Principality of San Luigi and they claimed sovereignty, as a theocracy, over the surrounding secular territory. Disease was endemic; attempts to convert the local Muslim population to Catholicism were rejected; and in less than a year, on August 2, 1884, the monastery was sacked and at least one monk was murdered. Five monks, including what the organization calls their third abbot, José Mendoza, survived and were exiled. Mendoza was somehow elected by less than the canonically required twelve monks. Without mentioning the Sahara and Sahel situated between Ghadames and the Sudd, the organization says that the monks traveled across the Sudd and arrived in the Kingdom of Bunyoro-Kitara on March 15, 1885. There, the organization says, Omukama Kabarega of Bunyoro granted territory to the monks to settle and establish a monastery. The organization says that Kabarega conferred a title, Mukungu of the Chieftainship of the Ancient Abbey-Principality of San Luigi, upon Mendoza. In 1888, all the monks, except for Mendoza, died from an epidemic; Mendoza abandoned the monastery in Bunyoro and returned to Europe. The organization says that "legalization by a French government official established the recognition of the Abbey-Principality by the French state" when Mayor Eugène Clairet of Seine-Port in Île-de-France, was apparently involved in some way with some type of transfer of titles from Mendoza to Girardot. On May 7, 1899, Girardot transferred those Mendoza titles to Vilatte, with Clairet somehow involved again.

The organization says that the monastery, of at least seven monks, "was constitutionally independent as a theocratic state" and a "colonising power" under which "the local population had no political rights whatsoever" and "were to be subjugated under the absolute rule" of the monastery. The organization confers reputed titles of nobility The organization also describes itself as an Old Catholic church. The organization believes itself to be the legitimate de jure government-in-exile of its former territory in the Fezzan. "The Abbey-Principality aims ultimately to secure the territorial restoration of the original Abbey-Principality in Libya, but is aware that political and related considerations are likely to preclude this objective for the time being". The organization also believes that it is also theoretically empowered to open embassies although it has not done so as yet.

In 1957, Girardot recanted his 1883 foundation story.

=== 1891 foundation story ===
The OCT was also allegedly founded in 1891 and authorized by Moran Mar Ignatius Peter IV, Syriac Orthodox Patriarch of Antioch. The ICOC asserts that because "none of the Eastern Orthodox Patriarchal Sees possess any type of direct Sovereignty, [...] the decorations instituted by them may not be deemed as equivalent to those bestowed by the Roman Pontiff not only in his Spiritual Capacity but also in his temporal position as Sovereign of the Vatican City State." "Protection is an attribute of Sovereignty, which none of these Sees actually possess," according to the ICOC. Ignatius Peter IV intended this order, according to Paul Schultz's 1977 pamphlet about the history of the group, to be like the Knights of Columbus.

=== In popular culture ===
The term "Order of the Crown of Thorns" is also used in popular culture. It appears in a story about a series of LEGO construction toy creations posted on LEGO fan community websites. It also appears in the role-playing game Chaotic Origin, which includes among its fantasy organizations The Seattle Order of the Crown of Thorns.

== Order of the Lion and the Black Cross ==
The Sovereign, Knightly and Noble Order of the Lion and the Black Cross (OLBC) (L'Ordre Souverain, Chevaleresque, et Noble du Lion et de Croix Noire

=== Valensi affair ===
On April 18, 1911, Le Petit Parisien reported that the Faubourg-Montmartre Police Commissioner and three magistrates searched Guillaume Valensi's home and office were they seized numerous diplomas and the flag of an order created by Valensi, a Tunisian. One of Valensi's accomplices was Clémenti, the president of the Ligue Nationale Humanitaire, a Corsican. Documents and blank diplomas of decorations of various orders were seized during a search of Clémenti's home. They included a number of blanks printed in Arabic and other bearing what purported to be, the signatures of Clemenceau, Henri Brisson, Victor Henri Rochefort, Marquis de Rochefort-Luçay, Léon Gambetta, and Victor Hugo. The evidence was filed in criminal court. Following the search, Valensi's brother, a doctor, requested that the court order a psychological evaluation of the accused. According to The North-China Herald and Supreme Court & Consular Gazette, Valensi was not placed on trial with the other five men because of his "breakdown of the mental faculties". The investigation was begun after a client became suspicious of the authenticity of the signatures and reported the whole affair. He revealed in a deposition that he purchased a diploma of the Tunisian order of Nichan Iftikhar for eighty francs from Clémenti. According to the deposition, Valensi sent the client to Clémenti, who provided the diploma. Valensi and Clémenti were arrested on charges of fraud and trafficking illegal decorations. According to The New York Times, the Berliner Lokal-Anzeiger reported that the trafficking in decorations scandal spread as far as Berlin were many well known persons were decorated. As it spread, searches were carried out against Valensi and his accomplices which led to several arrests. According to the trial record, Valensi's "part in the play was to pose as chief secretary to the Bey of Tunis, in which capacity he was supposed to be able to bestow the order of the Nichan Iftikar on deserving persons, for a consideration."

Valensi deceived many people. The New Zealand Herald described how the town of Lille had been "hoaxed in the most complete and amusing manner" by Valensi and two accomplices, who duped the authorities into thinking that they were Moorish notables. Valensi advertised the visit of Kaid Said Garda to Lille, described as a representative of the Sultan of Morocco. The Kaid and another "Moorish official" appeared, each wearing a burnous, and with them Valensi, in a red fez. They were received at the railway station by the local authorities and a number of Lille adherents of the "Order of the Golden Crescent of Morocco". The affair created great excitement in the town. At Valensi's hotel the Flag of Morocco was flown from the balcony. Speeches were made at a banquet by the Kaid in broken French and Valensi, and subsequently a number of decorations were distributed. The prefect of police in the town was nominated an officer of the "Golden Cross of Italy". Some well-known politicians were implicated in the scandal. It was revealed during the trial, that while in Lille, "the 'ambassadors' invited a couple of ladies whose language and gestures were so highly Parisian that the effect of the 'Mission' was spoilt. This story made everyone in Court laugh [...]" according to The North-China Herald and Supreme Court & Consular Gazette.

Vilatte was also implicated in the Valensi affair by being identified as the Marie Timothée of the Principality of San Luigi, whose signature appeared on diplomas of the Order of the Lion and the Black Cross trafficked by Valensi, who was described as a propagator of honorary and bizarre distinctions. Vilatte responded to Le Catholique Français article, based on Le Matin's article, about the diploma by stating that the story discredited him by incorrectly identifying him as the signatory. He declared that he had nothing to do with the published diploma, with Valensi, or with the Order of the Lion and the Black Cross and that his authentic OCT had nothing in common with the diploma from the Principality of San Luigi. "I do not bear the title of Marie Timothée, much less that of Prince, Grand Master of the Order of the Lion and the Black Cross", asserted Vilatte. He wrote that he never signed any document as Marie Timothée or Mar Timothée and made clear that he was given the religious name of Mar Timothéus I and not Marie Timothée. Vilatte was correct on two points. Neither La Croix nor Le Matin mentioned the name "Vilatte" or "Timothéus"; the diploma, which was printed in both La Croix and Le Matin, also did not mention the name "Vilatte" or "Timothéus". Le Catholique Français asked Vilatte about the identity of the Mar Timothée, diploma signatory, but he did not respond.

In 1913 La Revue critique des idées et des livres printed an article about the Valensi affair based on Maurice Pujo's Pourquoi l'on a étouffé l'affaire Valensi. Pujo connected the Valensi affair to organized crime centering on Georges Brassard and E. Deyber. Brassard was a wine merchant, a Radical Party executive committee delegate affiliated with Freemasonry and director of l'Agence spéciale parisienne. Deyber was a dismissed Sûreté Générale Police Commissioner.

Brassard and Deyber, added Pujo, provided houses for white slave trade and prostitution.

Pujo listed eight societies which mushroomed from Brassard's conglomerate or Republican policy as:

- National League for Civic Education (la Ligue nationale d'Education civique),
- National Humanitarian League (la Ligue nationale humanitaire),
- League of the Public Interest (la Ligue de l'Intérêt public),
- Grand Prix Humanitarian of France and the Colonies (le Grand Prix Humanitaire de France et des Colonies),
- Red Crescent of Morocco (le Croissant Rouge du Maroc), "an order which existed only in the fertile imagination of Valensi".
- National Society for the Encouragement of Progress (la Société nationale d'Encouragement au progrès),
- Knights of Saint Sebastian and William (les Chevaliers de Saint-Sébastien et Guillaume),
- Free State of Counani (l'Etat libre de Counani), which was exposed as a deception by 1906, according to seized documents, Valensi was Chancellor to the Consul-General in Paris for the make-believe state.

Pujo included an excerpt from a letter written by Collet, secretary of most Brassard companies, to Adolphe Brézet, "president of the Free State of Counani", stated that Brézet would receive, among several blank diplomas sent to him, a blank "officer of San Luigi" diploma.

== Condemnation by the Catholic Church ==
The Holy See had stated twice, first in 1953 and again in 1970, that it does not recognize either of the orders. Guy Stair Sainty wrote that an "increasing number of such bodies" troubled the Holy See which "issued statements condemning such 'Orders'" in 1935, 1953, 1970 and 1976. He noted that the "most complete recent condemnation" was included in Orders of Knighthood, Awards and the Holy See, by Archbishop Igino Eugenio Cardinale. The self-styled orders are described as "originating from private initiatives and aiming at replacing the legitimate forms of chivalric awards." The statement points out that, they "take their name from Orders which have in fact already existed but are now extinct [...] or [...] which had been planned but were never realized or, [...] which are truly fictitious and have no historical precedent at all." While they "style themselves as autonomous," these "private initiatives" qualify their names, according to the statement, with terms "which belong exclusively to authentic Orders duly approved by the Holy See" but are used by these "private initiatives" to "increase the confusion of those who are not aware of the true history of Orders of Knighthood and of their juridical condition." For example, "these alleged Orders claim for themselves [...] such titles as [...] Chivalric, [...] Sovereign, Nobiliary, Religious, [...]" "Among these private initiatives, which in no way are approved of or recognized by the Holy See, one can find alleged Orders such as" Saint John the Baptist, The Crown of Thorns and Lion of the Black Cross. The statement explains that, "to avoid equivocations [...] because of the abuse of pontifical and ecclesiastical documents, [...] and to put an end to the continuation of such abuses, entaling harmful consequences for people in good faith, we [...] declare that the Holy See does not recognize the value of the certificates and insignia conferred to the above-named alleged Orders." According to the ICOC, the "only recognised order with the style of 'Sovereign' existing nowadays" is the Sovereign Military Order of Malta and "whose international diplomatic 'status' as an independent non-territorial power is recognised officially by the Holy See and by many other Governments."

According to Robert Gayre these "Orders" are "clearly recent creations grafted on to old traditions. Such fantasies are not Orders of chivalry no matter how they may ape chivalric insignia and styles."

== See also ==
- False titles of nobility
- Scam title
