= Catholic Update =

- Type: Monthly newsletter
- Owner: Liguori Publications
- Founded: 1972
- Language: English
- Website: www.catholicupdate.org

Catholic Update is a four-page newsletter that explores Church teaching and traditions, promoting better understanding by all Catholics.

It is published by Liguori Publications, a ministry of the Redemptorists located in Liguori, Missouri.

First published in 1972 by St. Anthony Messenger Press, Catholic Update was intended for use as a parish handout to help explain the many changes then happening in the Catholic Church. It has grown into a publication used in about half of American Roman Catholic parishes, covering many topics of current concern and interest to Catholics in the United States. There are more than 350 titles currently available in both print and digital formats.

In 2014 the Catholic Update brand and product line was acquired from Franciscan Media by Liguori Publications.
