= Consultor =

In the Catholic Church, title for various advisory positions

A consultor is one who gives counsel, i.e., a counselor.

In the Catholic Church, it is a specific title for various advisory positions:

- in the Roman Curia, a consultor is a specially appointed expert who may be called upon for advice desired by a department. Consultors, who can be members of the clergy, female or male religious, or laity, and possibly even non-Catholics, are called upon according to need and according to their competence in specific fields. The decisions are then made by the cardinals and (since the Second Vatican Council) bishops who are members of the department, those of the greatest importance being made at plenary meetings, held in principle every year, at which even those members not resident in Rome take part, while those that are important but of ordinary character are taken at the more frequent ordinary meetings, and the day-to-day routine work is done by the prefect or president of the department, assisted by the secretary and under-secretary and the other members of the staff.
- in a diocese, the college of consultors consists of priests charged with advising the bishop; some decisions require that they be given a hearing, others require their consent; when a sede vacante situation arises, the college of consultors is obliged to elect a diocesan administrator within eight days of receiving notice of the vacancy.
- in certain regular congregations (i.e. religious orders) consultors can advise the superior-general, (e.g. the six geographically diverse consultors to the superior general of the Passionists), provincial superior (e.g. Redemptorist Vice-provincials), or a local superior.

== See also ==
- Definitor

== Sources and references ==
- Catholic Encyclopedia
