= September 11 =

September 11 this year in various calendars
- Friday, 11 September 2026
Akan	Kurufie
Armenian	23 Hoṙi 1476
Aztec	Tititl 4, 11 Malīnalli
Babylonian	28 Abu, 2337 SE
Balinese pawukon	Luang, Pepet, Pasah, Laba, Umanis, Paniron, Sukra of Menail, Brahma, Nohan, Pati
Bengali	27 Bhadro, BS 1433
Chinese	Yang Earth Rat・Ghost Mansion; Fire Horse Year, Month 8, Day 1 (Bailu, 12 days until Qiufen)
Common Era	11 September 2026 CE
Coptic	1 Thout, AM 1743
Egyptian	28 Tybi, 2775 NE
Ethiopian	1 Maskaram, 2019 Amätä Məhrät
French Republican	Décade III, Quintidi de Fructidor de l'Année 234 de la République
Gregorian	11 September, AD 2026
Hebrew	29 Elul, AM 5786
Hindu	Pūrvaphalgunī・Sādhya; Solar: 26 Bhādrapada, 1948 SE; Lunisolar: Amāvasyā, Kṛishna pakṣa of Śrāvaṇa, 2083 VE; Rāudra・5127 KY・1,872,829
Icelandic	Föstudagur, 18 Tvímánuður 2026
Islamic	28 Rabi' al-awwal, AH 1448 (using tabular method)
ISO week date	2026-W37-5
Japanese	1 Hazuki, Reiwa 8 (Hakuro, 12 days until Shūbun)
Julian	29 August, AD 2026 (AM 7534)
Julian day	2461295
Korean	1 Dakdal, 4359 DE
Maya	13.0.13.16.12; 5 Chen, 11 Eb
Roman	ante diem IV Kalendas Septembres, MMDCCLXXIX AUC
Solar Hijri	20 Shahrivar, SH 1405
Tibetan	30 gro bzhin, me pho rta 2153 or 1772 or 1000

<<	September					>>
Su	Mo	Tu	We	Th	Fr	Sa
		1	2	3	4	5
6	7	8	9	10	11	12
13	14	15	16	17	18	19
20	21	22	23	24	25	26
27	28	29	30
2026

September 11 in recent years
2026 (Friday)
2025 (Thursday)
2024 (Wednesday)
2023 (Monday)
2022 (Sunday)
2021 (Saturday)
2020 (Friday)
2019 (Wednesday)
2018 (Tuesday)
2017 (Monday)

September 11 is the 254th day of the year (255th in leap years) in the Gregorian calendar; 111 days remain until the end of the year.

== Events ==
=== Pre-1600 ===
- 9 – The Battle of the Teutoburg Forest ends: The Roman Empire suffers the greatest defeat of its history and the Rhine is established as the border between the Empire and the so-called barbarians for the next four hundred years.
- 911 – William I of Aquitaine gifts abbot Berno a group of lands close to Mâcon to found a new monastery. Contrary to other Benedictine monasteries, William sets the monastery outside of the control of any feudal lord.
- 1185 – Isaac II Angelos kills Stephen Hagiochristophorites and then appeals to the people, resulting in the revolt that deposes Andronikos I Komnenos and places Isaac on the throne of the Byzantine Empire.
- 1275 – An earthquake occurs in the south of Great Britain, notably causing multiple fatalities as well as destroying St Michael's Church on Glastonbury Tor.
- 1297 – Battle of Stirling Bridge: Scots jointly led by William Wallace and Andrew Moray defeat the English.
- 1390 – Lithuanian Civil War (1389–1392): The Teutonic Knights begin a five-week siege of Vilnius.
- 1541 – Santiago, Chile, is attacked by indigenous warriors, led by Michimalonco, to free eight indigenous chiefs held captive by the Spaniards.
- 1565 – Ottoman forces retreat from Malta ending the Great Siege of Malta.

=== 1601–1900 ===
- 1609 – Henry Hudson arrives on Manhattan Island and meets the indigenous people living there.
- 1649 – Siege of Drogheda ends: Oliver Cromwell's Parliamentarian troops take the town and execute its garrison.
- 1683 – Coalition forces, including the famous winged Hussars, led by Polish King John III Sobieski lift the siege laid by Ottoman forces ahead of the Battle of Vienna.
- 1697 – Battle of Zenta: a major engagement in the Great Turkish War (1683–1699) and one of the most decisive defeats in Ottoman history.
- 1708 – Charles XII of Sweden stops his march to conquer Moscow outside Smolensk, marking the turning point in the Great Northern War. The army is defeated nine months later in the Battle of Poltava, and the Swedish Empire ceases to be a major power.
- 1709 – Battle of Malplaquet: Great Britain, Netherlands, and Austria fight against France.
- 1714 – Siege of Barcelona: Barcelona, capital city of the Principality of Catalonia, surrenders to Spanish and French Bourbon armies in the War of the Catalans, the last phase of the War of the Spanish Succession.
- 1758 – Battle of Saint Cast: France repels British invasion during the Seven Years' War.
- 1775 – Benedict Arnold's expedition to Quebec leaves Cambridge, Massachusetts.
- 1776 – British–American peace conference on Staten Island fails to stop nascent American Revolutionary War.
- 1777 – American Revolutionary War: Battle of Brandywine: The British celebrate a major victory in Chester County, Pennsylvania.
- 1780 – American Revolutionary War: Sugarloaf massacre: A small detachment of militia from Northampton County, Pennsylvania, are attacked by Native Americans and Loyalists near Little Nescopeck Creek.
- 1786 – The beginning of the Annapolis Convention.
- 1789 – Alexander Hamilton is appointed the first United States Secretary of the Treasury.
- 1792 – The Hope Diamond is stolen along with other French crown jewels when six men break into the house where they are stored.
- 1800 – The Maltese National Congress Battalions are disbanded by British Civil Commissioner Alexander Ball.
- 1802 – France annexes the Kingdom of Piedmont.
- 1803 – The Battle of Delhi, during the Second Anglo-Maratha War, between British troops under General Lake, and Marathas of Scindia's army under General Louis Bourquin ends in a British victory.
- 1814 – War of 1812: The climax of the Battle of Plattsburgh, a major United States victory in the war.
- 1829 – An expedition led by Isidro Barradas at Tampico, sent by the Spanish crown to retake Mexico, surrenders at the Battle of Tampico, marking the effective end of Spain's resistance to Mexico's campaign for independence.
- 1836 – The Riograndense Republic is proclaimed by rebels after defeating Empire of Brazil's troops in the Battle of Seival, during the Ragamuffin War.
- 1840 – An Anglo-Turkish force captures Beirut with the help of bombardment by an English fleet.
- 1851 – Christiana Resistance: Escaped slaves led by William Parker fight off and kill a slave owner who, with a federal marshal and an armed party, sought to seize three of his former slaves in Christiana, Pennsylvania, thereby creating a cause célèbre between slavery proponents and abolitionists.
- 1852 – Outbreak of Revolution of September 11 resulting in the State of Buenos Aires declaring independence as a Republic.
- 1857 – The Mountain Meadows massacre: Mormon settlers and Paiutes massacre 120 pioneers at Mountain Meadows, Utah.
- 1881 – In the Swiss state of Glarus, a rockslide buries parts of the village of Elm, destroying 83 buildings and killing 115 people.
- 1897 – After months of pursuit, generals of Menelik II of Ethiopia capture Gaki Sherocho, the last king of the Kaffa.

=== 1901–present ===
- 1903 – The first race at the Milwaukee Mile in West Allis, Wisconsin is held. It is the oldest major speedway in the world.
- 1905 – The Ninth Avenue derailment occurs in New York City, killing 13.
- 1914 – World War I: Australia invades German New Guinea, defeating a German contingent at the Battle of Bita Paka.
- 1914 – The Second Period of Russification: The teaching of the Russian language and Russian history in Finnish schools is ordered to be considerably increased as part of the forced Russification program in Finland run by Tsar Nicholas II.
- 1916 – The Quebec Bridge's central span collapses, killing 11 men. The bridge previously collapsed completely on August 29, 1907.
- 1919 – United States Marine Corps invades Honduras.
- 1921 – Nahalal, a Jewish moshav in Palestine, is settled.
- 1922 – The Treaty of Kars is ratified in Yerevan, Armenia.
- 1941 – Construction begins on the Pentagon.
- 1941 – Charles Lindbergh makes his Des Moines speech accusing the British, Jews and FDR's administration of conspiring for war with Germany.
- 1943 – World War II: German troops occupy Corsica and Kosovo-Metohija ending the Italian occupation of Corsica.
- 1944 – World War II: RAF bombing raid on Darmstadt and the following firestorm kill 11,500.
- 1945 – World War II: Batu Lintang camp, a Japanese-run POW and civilian internment camp on the island of Borneo, is liberated by Australian 9th Division forces.
- 1954 – Hurricane Edna hits New England (United States) as a Category 2 hurricane, causing significant damage and 29 deaths.
- 1961 – Hurricane Carla strikes the Texas coast as a Category 4 hurricane, the second strongest storm ever to hit the state.
- 1965 – Indo-Pakistani War: The Indian Army captures the town of Burki, just southeast of Lahore.
- 1967 – China's People's Liberation Army (PLA) launched an attack on Indian posts at Nathu La, Sikkim, India, which resulted in military clashes.
- 1968 – Air France Flight 1611 crashes off Nice, France, killing 89 passengers and six crew.
- 1968 – John Eliot Gardiner conducts Monteverdi's Vespro della Beata Vergine with the Monteverdi Choir at the Proms.
- 1968 – Air Canada Flight 303, a Vickers Viscount 757, was the subject of an attempted plane hijacking to Cuba by a person being chased by the CIA.
- 1970 – The Dawson's Field hijackers release 88 of their hostages. The remaining hostages, mostly Jews and Israeli citizens, are held until September 25.
- 1971 – The Egyptian Constitution becomes official.
- 1971 – The Festival Rock y Ruedas de Avándaro rock festival is held in the State of Mexico. It attracted more than 100,000 attendees during the Mexican Dirty War, a period marked by widespread political repression.
- 1972 – The San Francisco Bay Area Rapid Transit system begins passenger service.
- 1973 – A coup in Chile, headed by General Augusto Pinochet, topples the democratically elected president Salvador Allende.
- 1973 – JAT Airways Flight 769 crashes into the Maganik mountain range while on approach to Titograd Airport, killing 35 passengers and six crew.
- 1974 – Eastern Air Lines Flight 212 crashes in Charlotte, North Carolina, killing 69 passengers and two crew.
- 1976 – A bomb planted by a Croatian terrorist, Zvonko Bušić, is found at New York's Grand Central Terminal; one NYPD officer is killed trying to defuse it.
- 1977 – Atari, Inc. releases the Video Computer System (VCS), later renamed the Atari 2600 in 1982.
- 1980 – A new constitution of Chile is established under the influence of then Chilean dictator Augusto Pinochet, which is subject to controversy in Chile today.
- 1982 – The international forces that were guaranteeing the safety of Palestinian refugees following Israel's 1982 Invasion of Lebanon leave Beirut. Five days later, several thousand refugees are massacred in the Sabra and Shatila refugee camps by Phalange forces.
- 1985 – Moimenta-Alcafache train crash, the worst railway accident to occur in Portugal.
- 1989 – Hungary announces that the East German refugees who had been housed in temporary camps were free to leave for West Germany.
- 1990 – A Faucett Boeing 727 disappears in the Atlantic Ocean while being flown from Malta to Peru.
- 1991 – Continental Express Flight 2574 crashes in Colorado County, Texas, near Eagle Lake, killing 11 passengers and three crew.
- 1992 – Hurricane Iniki strikes the island of Kauaʻi, Hawaii, killing seven and causing $3.1bn in economic damages.
- 1995 – The first game of the PCA World Chess Championship 1995, pitting incumbent champion Garry Kasparov against challenger Viswanathan Anand, takes place on the 107th floor of the World Trade Center's South Tower in New York City.
- 1997 – NASA's Mars Global Surveyor reaches Mars.
- 1997 – Kurkse tragedy: Fourteen Estonian soldiers of the Baltic Battalion are drowned or die of hypothermia during a training exercise in the Kurkse Strait.
- 1997 – After a nationwide referendum, Scotland votes to establish a devolved parliament within the United Kingdom.
- 2001 – Nineteen members of al-Qaeda execute the September 11 attacks, a series of coordinated terrorist attacks that killed 2,977 people using four hijacked aircraft. Two aircraft crash into the World Trade Center in New York City, a third crashes into The Pentagon in Arlington County, Virginia, and a fourth into a field near Shanksville, Pennsylvania.
- 2007 – Russia tests the largest conventional weapon ever, the Father of All Bombs.
- 2008 – A major Channel Tunnel fire breaks out on a freight train, resulting in the closure of part of the tunnel for six months.
- 2011 – A dedication ceremony is held at the United States National September 11 Memorial on the 10th anniversary of the September 11 attacks in New York City, and the memorial opens to family members.
- 2012 – A total of 315 people are killed in two garment factory fires in Pakistan.
- 2012 – The U.S. embassy in Benghazi, Libya is attacked, resulting in four deaths.
- 2015 – A crane collapses onto the Masjid al-Haram mosque in Saudi Arabia, killing 111 people and injuring 394 others.
- 2023 – The Libyan city of Derna experiences catastrophic floods after Storm Daniel causes two dams to collapse, killing thousands of people.
- 2024 – Hurricane Francine impacts the Gulf of Mexico, as a Category 2 hurricane.
- 2024 – Soyuz MS-26 is launched to the International Space Station, setting a record of 19 people in orbit at the same time.
- 2025 – Progress MS-32 is launched to resupply the International Space Station. It is the 300th spacecraft launched to the ISS.

== Births ==
=== Pre-1600 ===
- 600 – Yuknoom Ch'een II, Mayan ruler
- 1182 – Minamoto no Yoriie, Japanese shōgun (died 1204)
- 1318 – Eleanor of Lancaster, countess of Arundel (died 1372)
- 1465 – Bernardo Accolti, Italian poet (died 1536)
- 1476 – Louise of Savoy, French regent (died 1531)
- 1494 – Elisabeth of Brunswick-Lüneburg, Duchess of Guelders (1518–1538) (died 1572)
- 1522 – Ulisse Aldrovandi, Italian ornithologist and botanist (died 1605)
- 1524 – Pierre de Ronsard, French poet and author (died 1585)
- 1525 – John George, Elector of Brandenburg (died 1598)
- 1557 – Joseph Calasanz, Spanish priest and founder of Piarists (died 1648)
- 1572 – Daniyal, Imperial Prince of the Royal House of Timur (died 1604)
- 1578 – Vincenzo Maculani, Catholic cardinal (died 1667)

=== 1601–1900 ===
- 1611 – Henri de la Tour d'Auvergne, Vicomte de Turenne, French general (died 1675)
- 1681 – Johann Gottlieb Heineccius, German academic and jurist (died 1741)
- 1700 – James Thomson, Scottish poet and playwright (died 1748)
- 1711 – William Boyce, English organist and composer (died 1779)
- 1723 – Johann Bernhard Basedow, German author and educator (died 1790)
- 1751 – Princess Charlotte of Saxe-Meiningen (died 1827)
- 1764 – Valentino Fioravanti, Italian organist and composer (died 1837)
- 1771 – Mungo Park, Scottish surgeon and explorer (died 1806)
- 1786 – Friedrich Kuhlau, German-Danish pianist and composer (died 1832)
- 1798 – Franz Ernst Neumann, German mineralogist and physicist (died 1895)
- 1800 – Daniel S. Dickinson, American lawyer and politician, 13th Lieutenant Governor of New York (died 1866)
- 1816 – Carl Zeiss, German lens maker, created the Optical instrument (died 1888)
- 1825 – Eduard Hanslick, Bohemian-Austrian musicologist and critic (died 1904)
- 1829 – Thomas Hill, American painter (died 1908)
- 1836 – Fitz Hugh Ludlow, American journalist, author, and explorer (died 1870)
- 1838 – John Ireland, Irish-American archbishop (died 1918)
- 1847 – Mary Watson Whitney, American astronomer and academic (died 1921)
- 1859 – Vjenceslav Novak, Croatian author and playwright (died 1905)
- 1860 – James Allan, New Zealand rugby player (died 1934)
- 1861 – Juhani Aho, Finnish author and journalist (died 1921)
- 1862 – Julian Byng, 1st Viscount Byng of Vimy, English field marshal and politician, 12th Governor General of Canada (died 1935)
- 1862 – Hawley Harvey Crippen, American physician (died 1910)
- 1862 – O. Henry, American short story writer (died 1910)
- 1865 – Rainis, Latvian poet and playwright (died 1929)
- 1871 – Scipione Borghese, 10th Prince of Sulmona, Italian racing driver, mountaineer, and politician (died 1927)
- 1876 – Stan Rowley, Australian sprinter (died 1924)
- 1877 – Felix Dzerzhinsky, Polish-Russian academic and politician (died 1926)
- 1877 – James Hopwood Jeans, English physicist, astronomer, and mathematician (died 1946)
- 1879 – Louis Coatalen, French engineer (died 1962)
- 1884 – Sudhamoy Pramanick, Indian activist and politician (died 1974)
- 1885 – D. H. Lawrence, English novelist, poet, playwright, and critic (died 1930)
- 1885 – Herbert Stothart, American composer and conductor (died 1949)
- 1891 – William Thomas Walsh, American historian, author, and educator (died 1949)
- 1893 – Douglas Hawkes, English-Greek racing driver and engineer (died 1974)
- 1895 – Vinoba Bhave, Indian philosopher and Gandhian, Bharat Ratna Awardee (died 1982)
- 1898 – Gerald Templer, English field marshal and politician, British High Commissioner in Malaya (died 1979)
- 1899 – Philipp Bouhler, German politician (died 1945)
- 1899 – Jimmie Davis, American singer-songwriter and politician, 47th Governor of Louisiana (died 2000)
- 1899 – Anton Koolmann, Estonian wrestler and coach (died 1953)

=== 1901–present ===
- 1901 – D. W. Brooks, American farmer and businessman, founded Gold Kist (died 1999)
- 1903 – Theodor Adorno, German sociologist and philosopher (died 1969)
- 1903 – Stephen Etnier, American lieutenant and painter (died 1984)
- 1904 – Karl Plutus, Estonian lawyer and jurist (died 2010)
- 1907 – Cécile Chabot, Canadian poet and illustrator (died 1990)
- 1907 – Lev Oborin, Russian pianist and educator (died 1974)
- 1908 – Alvar Lidell, English journalist (died 1981)
- 1911 – Lala Amarnath, Indian cricketer (died 2000)
- 1911 – Bola de Nieve, Cuban singer-songwriter and pianist (died 1971)
- 1913 – Bear Bryant, American football player and coach (died 1983)
- 1913 – Jacinto Convit, Venezuelan physician and academic (died 2014)
- 1914 – Serbian Patriarch Pavle II (died 2009)
- 1915 – Dajikaka Gadgil, Indian jeweller (died 2014)
- 1916 – Ed Sabol, American film producer, co-founded NFL Films (died 2015)
- 1917 – Donald Blakeslee, American colonel and pilot (died 2008)
- 1917 – Herbert Lom, Czech-born English actor (died 2012)
- 1917 – Ferdinand Marcos, Filipino soldier, lawyer, and politician, 10th President of the Philippines (died 1989)
- 1917 – Jessica Mitford, English-American journalist and author (died 1996)
- 1917 – Daniel Wildenstein, French art dealer and horse breeder (died 2001)
- 1921 – Leaford Bearskin, American tribal leader and colonel (died 2012)
- 1923 – Betsy Drake, American actress (died 2015)
- 1923 – Vasilije Mokranjac, Serbian composer and academic (died 1984)
- 1923 – Alan Badel, English actor (died 1982)
- 1924 – Daniel Akaka, American soldier, engineer, and politician (died 2018)
- 1924 – Tom Landry, American football player and coach (died 2000)
- 1924 – Rudolf Vrba, Czech-Canadian pharmacologist and educator (died 2006)
- 1925 – Harry Somers, Canadian soldier and composer (died 1999)
- 1926 – Eddie Miksis, American baseball player (died 2005)
- 1927 – Keith Holman, Australian rugby league player and coach (died 2011)
- 1927 – G. David Schine, American soldier and businessman (died 1996)
- 1928 – Reubin Askew, American sergeant, lawyer, and politician, 37th Governor of Florida (died 2014)
- 1928 – Earl Holliman, American actor (died 2024)
- 1929 – David S. Broder, American political journalist and pundit (died 2011)
- 1929 – Luis García, Venezuelan baseball player and manager (died 2014)
- 1929 – Primož Kozak, Slovenian playwright (died 1981)
- 1929 – Patrick Mayhew, English lawyer and politician, Secretary of State for Northern Ireland (died 2016)
- 1930 – Cathryn Damon, American actress and dancer (died 1987)
- 1930 – Jean-Claude Forest, French author and illustrator (died 1998)
- 1930 – Saleh Selim, Egyptian footballer, manager, and actor (died 2002)
- 1931 – Hans-Ulrich Wehler, German historian and academic (died 2014)
- 1933 – Margaret Booth, English lawyer and judge (died 2021)
- 1933 – William Luther Pierce, American author and activist (died 2002)
- 1933 – Nicola Pietrangeli, Italian tennis player (died 2025)
- 1934 – Oliver Jones, Canadian jazz pianist and composer (died 2026)
- 1935 – Arvo Pärt, Estonian composer
- 1935 – Gherman Titov, Russian general, pilot, and astronaut (died 2000)
- 1936 – Pavel Landovský, Czech actor, director, and playwright (died 2014)
- 1937 – Robert Crippen, American captain, pilot, and astronaut
- 1937 – Queen Paola of Belgium
- 1938 – Brian F. G. Johnson, English chemist and academic
- 1939 – Charles Geschke, American businessman, co-founded Adobe Systems (died 2021)
- 1940 – Brian De Palma, American director, producer, and screenwriter
- 1940 – Nông Đức Mạnh, Vietnamese politician
- 1940 – Theodore Olson, American lawyer (died 2024)
- 1941 – Minnijean Brown-Trickey, Civil Rights activist and Little Rock Nine member
- 1942 – Lola Falana, American actress, singer, and dancer
- 1943 – André Caillé, Canadian chemist and businessman
- 1943 – Mickey Hart, American musician
- 1943 – Brian Perkins, New Zealand-English journalist and actor
- 1944 – Everaldo, Brazilian footballer (died 1974)
- 1944 – Freddy Thielemans, Belgian educator and politician, Mayor of Brussels (died 2022)
- 1945 – Franz Beckenbauer, German footballer and manager (died 2024)
- 1945 – Gianluigi Gelmetti, Italian composer and conductor (died 2021)
- 1945 – Leo Kottke, American singer-songwriter and guitarist
- 1947 – John Agrue, American serial killer (died 2009)
- 1948 – John Martyn, English-Scottish singer-songwriter and guitarist (died 2009)
- 1949 – Roger Uttley, English rugby player and coach
- 1949 – Bill Whittington, American racing driver (died 2021)
- 1950 – Anne Dell, Australian biochemist and academic
- 1950 – Bruce Doull, Australian footballer
- 1950 – Amy Madigan, American actress
- 1950 – Barry Sheene, English motorcycle racer and sportscaster (died 2003)
- 1951 – Johnny Neumann, American basketball player and coach (died 2019)
- 1951 – Hugo Porta, Argentinian rugby player
- 1952 – Catherine Bott, English soprano
- 1953 – Sarita Francis, Former Montserrat Deputy Governor
- 1953 – Renée Geyer, Australian singer-songwriter (died 2023)
- 1953 – Tommy Shaw, American singer-songwriter and guitarist
- 1956 – Tony Gilroy, American director, producer, and screenwriter
- 1958 – Roxann Dawson, American actress and director
- 1958 – Scott Patterson, American actor and baseball player
- 1959 – David Frost, South African golfer
- 1959 – John Hawkes, American actor
- 1960 – Hiroshi Amano, Japanese physicist and academic, Nobel Prize laureate
- 1960 – Anne Ramsay, American actress
- 1961 – Virginia Madsen, American actress
- 1961 – Samina Raja, Pakistani poet and educator (died 2012)
- 1962 – Filip Dewinter, Belgian politician
- 1962 – Kristy McNichol, American actress
- 1962 – Victoria Poleva, Ukrainian pianist and composer
- 1962 – Julio Salinas, Spanish footballer
- 1963 – Dave Bidini, Canadian singer-songwriter and guitarist
- 1964 – Ellis Burks, American baseball player
- 1964 – Victor Wooten, American jazz-fusion, funk, and bluegrass bass guitarist and producer
- 1965 – Bashar al-Assad, Syrian politician, 21st President of Syria
- 1965 – Paul Heyman, American wrestling promoter, manager, and journalist
- 1965 – Moby, American singer-songwriter, musician, and DJ
- 1967 – Maria Bartiromo, American financial journalist and television personality
- 1967 – Harry Connick Jr., American singer-songwriter, pianist, actor, and talk show host
- 1967 – Sung Jae-gi, South Korean activist, founded Man of Korea (died 2013)
- 1968 – Allan Alaküla, Estonian journalist
- 1970 – Antonio Gómez Medina, Mexican wrestler
- 1970 – Ted Leo, American singer and musician
- 1970 – Taraji P. Henson, American actress and singer
- 1971 – Richard Ashcroft, English singer-songwriter and musician
- 1974 – DeLisha Milton-Jones, American basketball player and coach
- 1975 – Juan Cobián, Argentinian footballer
- 1975 – Pierre Issa, South African footballer
- 1976 – Tomáš Enge, Czech racing driver
- 1977 – Jonny Buckland, Welsh guitarist
- 1977 – Ludacris, American rapper and producer
- 1977 – Matthew Stevens, Welsh snooker player
- 1977 – Tobias Zellner, German footballer
- 1978 – Dejan Stanković, Serbian footballer and manager
- 1979 – Eric Abidal, French footballer
- 1979 – Frank Francisco, Dominican baseball player
- 1979 – David Pizarro, Chilean footballer
- 1979 – Ariana Richards, American actress and artist
- 1980 – Mike Comrie, Canadian ice hockey player
- 1980 – Greet Daems, Belgian politician
- 1981 – Charles Kelley, American singer and musician
- 1981 – Dylan Klebold, American mass murderer, responsible for the Columbine High School massacre (died 1999)
- 1981 – Michael Sukkar, Australian politician
- 1982 – Elvan Abeylegesse, Ethiopian-Turkish runner
- 1982 – Sviatlana Tsikhanouskaya, Belarusian politician
- 1983 – Vivian Cheruiyot, Kenyan runner
- 1985 – Shaun Livingston, American basketball player
- 1986 – Chiliboy Ralepelle, South African rugby player
- 1986 – LaToya Sanders, American basketball player
- 1986 – Ben Scrivens, Canadian ice hockey player
- 1987 – Robert Acquafresca, Italian footballer
- 1987 – Elizabeth Henstridge, English actress
- 1987 – Tyler Hoechlin, American actor
- 1990 – Jo Inge Berget, Norwegian footballer
- 1991 – Jordan Ayew, Ghanaian footballer
- 1991 – Kygo, Norwegian DJ
- 1994 – Teuvo Teräväinen, Finnish ice hockey player
- 1994 – Nicky Case, Canadian game developer
- 1996 – Ross Colton, American professional ice hockey player
- 1997 – Harmony Tan, French tennis player
- 2000 – Leandro Bolmaro, Argentine-Italian basketball player
- 2000 – Zay Flowers, American football player
- 2001 – Joseph Fahnbulleh, Liberian-American sprinter
- 2001 – Nicholas Robertson, American ice hockey player
- 2006 – Oliver Peake, Australian cricketer

== Deaths ==
=== Pre-1600 ===
- 883 – Kesta Styppiotes, Byzantine general
- 1063 – Béla I of Hungary (born 1016)
- 1161 – Melisende, Queen of Jerusalem (born 1105)
- 1185 – Stephen Hagiochristophorites, Byzantine courtier (born 1130)
- 1279 – Robert Kilwardby, English cardinal (born 1215)
- 1297 – Hugh de Cressingham, English Treasurer
- 1298 – Philip of Artois, Lord of Conches, Nonancourt, and Domfront (born 1269)
- 1349 – Bonne of Luxembourg, spouse of John II of France (born 1315)
- 1569 – Vincenza Armani, Italian actress (born 1530)
- 1599 – Beatrice Cenci, Italian noblewoman (born 1577)

=== 1601–1900 ===
- 1677 – James Harrington, English philosopher and author (born 1611)
- 1680 – Emperor Go-Mizunoo of Japan (born 1596)
- 1721 – Rudolf Jakob Camerarius, German botanist and physician (born 1665)
- 1733 – François Couperin, French organist and composer (born 1668)
- 1760 – Louis Godin, French astronomer and academic (born 1704)
- 1823 – David Ricardo, English economist and politician (born 1772)
- 1843 – Joseph Nicollet, French mathematician and explorer (born 1786)
- 1846 – José Núñez de Cáceres, Dominican politician and writer, leader of the Independence movement of the Dominican Republic (born 1772)
- 1851 – Sylvester Graham, American minister and dietary reformer, namesake of the graham cracker (born 1794)
- 1865 – Christophe Léon Louis Juchault de Lamoricière, French general (born 1806)
- 1888 – Domingo Faustino Sarmiento, Argentinian journalist and politician, 7th President of Argentina (born 1811)
- 1896 – Francis James Child, American scholar and educator (born 1825)
- 1898 – Nikoline Harbitz, Norwegian author (born 1841)

=== 1901–present ===
- 1911 – Louis Henri Boussenard, French explorer and author (born 1847)
- 1915 – William Sprague IV, American businessman and politician, 27th Governor of Rhode Island (born 1830)
- 1917 – Georges Guynemer, French captain and pilot (born 1894)
- 1921 – Subramania Bharati, Indian journalist, poet, and activist (born 1882)
- 1926 – Matsunosuke Onoe, Japanese actor and director (born 1875)
- 1932 – Stanisław Wigura, Polish pilot and businessman, co-founded the RWD Company (born 1901)
- 1932 – Franciszek Żwirko, Polish soldier and pilot (born 1895)
- 1935 – Charles Norris, American coroner (born 1867)
- 1939 – Konstantin Korovin, Russian-French painter and set designer (born 1861)
- 1941 – Christian Rakovsky, Bulgarian physician, journalist, and politician, Soviet Ambassador to France (born 1873)
- 1941 – Aleksandra Izmailovich, Belarusian revolutionary (born 1878)
- 1941 – Maria Spiridonova, Russian revolutionary (born 1884)
- 1948 – Muhammad Ali Jinnah, Pakistani lawyer and politician, 1st Governor-General of Pakistan (born 1876)
- 1949 – Henri Rabaud, French composer and conductor (born 1873)
- 1950 – Jan Smuts, South African field marshal and politician, 2nd Prime Minister of South Africa (born 1870)
- 1956 – Billy Bishop, Canadian colonel and pilot (born 1894)
- 1957 – Mary Proctor, American astronomer (born 1862)
- 1958 – Camillien Houde, Canadian politician, 34th Mayor of Montreal (born 1889)
- 1958 – Robert W. Service, English-French poet and author (born 1874)
- 1959 – Paul Douglas, American actor (born 1907)
- 1964 – Gajanan Madhav Muktibodh, Indian poet and critic (born 1917)
- 1965 – Ralph C. Smedley, American educator, founded Toastmasters International (born 1878)
- 1966 – Collett E. Woolman, American businessman, co-founded Delta Air Lines (born 1889)
- 1967 – Tadeusz Żyliński, Polish engineer and academic (born 1904)
- 1968 – René Cogny, French general (born 1904)
- 1971 – Nikita Khrushchev, Russian general and politician (born 1894)
- 1973 – Salvador Allende, Chilean physician and politician, 29th President of Chile (born 1908)
- 1973 – Neem Karoli Baba, Indian philosopher and guru
- 1974 – Lois Lenski, American author and illustrator (born 1893)
- 1978 – Mike Gazella, American baseball player and manager (born 1895)
- 1978 – Georgi Markov, Bulgarian author and playwright (born 1929)
- 1978 – Janet Parker, English photographer (born 1938)
- 1978 – Ronnie Peterson, Swedish racing driver (born 1944)
- 1982 – Albert Soboul, French historian and academic (born 1914)
- 1983 – Brian Lawrance, Australian bandleader and singer (born 1909)
- 1984 – Jerry Voorhis, American politician (born 1901)
- 1985 – William Alwyn, English composer, conductor, and educator (born 1905)
- 1985 – Henrietta Barnett, British Women's Royal Air Force officer (born 1905)
- 1985 – Eleanor Dark, Australian author (born 1901)
- 1986 – Panagiotis Kanellopoulos, Greek academic and politician, 138th Prime Minister of Greece (born 1902)
- 1986 – Noel Streatfeild, English author (born 1895)
- 1987 – Lorne Greene, Canadian actor (born 1915)
- 1987 – Peter Tosh, Jamaican singer-songwriter and guitarist (born 1944)
- 1987 – Mahadevi Varma, Indian poet and educator (born 1907)
- 1988 – Roger Hargreaves, English author and illustrator (born 1935)
- 1990 – Myrna Mack, Guatemalan anthropologist and activist (born 1949)
- 1993 – Antoine Izméry, Haitian businessman and activist
- 1993 – Erich Leinsdorf, Austrian-American conductor (born 1912)
- 1993 – Mary Jane Reoch, American cyclist (born 1945)
- 1994 – Luciano Sgrizzi, Italian harpsichordist, pianist, and composer (born 1910)
- 1994 – Jessica Tandy, English-American actress (born 1909)
- 1995 – Anita Harding, English neurologist and academic (born 1952)
- 1997 – Camille Henry, Canadian ice hockey player and coach (born 1933)
- 1997 – Hannah Weiner, American poet (born 1928)
- 1998 – Dane Clark, American actor (born 1912)
- 1999 – Belkis Ayón, Cuban painter and lithographer (born 1967)
- 1999 – Gonzalo Rodríguez, Uruguayan racing driver (born 1972)
- 2001 – Alice Stewart Trillin, American author and educator (born 1938)
- 2001 – Henry Herbert, 7th Earl of Carnarvon, British peer and racing manager to Queen Elizabeth II (born 1924)
- 2001 – Casualties of the September 11 attacks: see Category:Victims of the September 11 attacks
- 2002 – Kim Hunter, American actress (born 1922)
- 2002 – Johnny Unitas, American football player and sportscaster (born 1933)
- 2003 – Anna Lindh, Swedish politician, 39th Minister of Foreign Affairs for Sweden (born 1957)
- 2003 – John Ritter, American actor (born 1948)
- 2004 – Fred Ebb, American songwriter (born 1928)
- 2004 – Patriarch Peter VII of Alexandria (born 1949)
- 2006 – William Auld, Scottish poet and author (born 1924)
- 2006 – Joachim Fest, German journalist and author (born 1926)
- 2007 – Ian Porterfield, Scottish footballer and manager (born 1946)
- 2007 – Jean Séguy, French sociologist and author (born 1925)
- 2007 – Joe Zawinul, Austrian keyboard player and songwriter (born 1932)
- 2009 – Jim Carroll, American author, poet and musician (born 1949)
- 2009 – Pierre Cossette, Canadian producer and manager (born 1923)
- 2009 – Larry Gelbart, American director, producer, and screenwriter (born 1928)
- 2009 – Yoshito Usui, Japanese author and illustrator (born 1958)
- 2010 – Harold Gould, American actor (born 1923)
- 2010 – Kevin McCarthy, American actor (born 1914)
- 2011 – Christian Bakkerud, Danish racing driver (born 1984)
- 2011 – Ralph Gubbins, English footballer (born 1932)
- 2011 – Andy Whitfield, Welsh actor and model (born 1971)
- 2012 – Finn Bergesen, Norwegian civil servant and businessman (born 1945)
- 2012 – Tomas Evjen, Norwegian cinematographer and producer (born 1972)
- 2012 – J. Christopher Stevens, American lawyer and diplomat, 10th United States Ambassador to Libya (born 1960)
- 2013 – Francisco Chavez, Filipino lawyer and politician, Solicitor General of the Philippines (born 1947)
- 2013 – Albert Jacquard, French geneticist and biologist (born 1925)
- 2013 – Andrzej Trybulec, Polish mathematician and computer scientist (born 1941)
- 2014 – Antoine Duhamel, French composer and conductor (born 1925)
- 2014 – Donald Sinden, English actor (born 1923)
- 2016 – Alexis Arquette, American actress, musician and cabaret performer (born 1969)
- 2019 – B. J. Habibie, 3rd President of Indonesia (born 1936)
- 2020 – Toots Hibbert, Jamaican singer and songwriter (born 1942)
- 2020 – Swami Agnivesh, an Indian social activist and the founder of Arya Sabha, a political party based on the principles of Arya Samaj (born 1939)
- 2021 – Abimael Guzmán, Peruvian philosopher and academic (born 1934)
- 2022 – Javier Marías, Spanish novelist, journalist and translator (born 1951)
- 2022 – John W. O'Malley, American academic, Catholic historian, and Jesuit priest (born 1927)
- 2022 – Joyce Reynolds, British classicist and academic (born 1918)
- 2024 – Kenneth Cope, British actor (born 1931)
- 2024 – Alberto Fujimori, Peruvian politician, professor, and engineer, President of Peru (born 1938)
- 2024 – Chad McQueen, American actor and race car driver (born 1960)
- 2024 – Joe Schmidt, American football player and coach (born 1932)
- 2025 – John D. Petersen, American chemist, educator, and academic administrator (born 1947)
- 2026 – Princess Astrid, Mrs. Ferner, Norwegian princess (born 1932)

== Holidays and observances ==
- Battle of Tendra Day (Russia)
- Christian feast days:
  - Blessed Francesco Bonifacio
  - Blessed Bonaventura Gran
  - Deiniol
  - Felix, Regula, and Exuperantius
  - Harry Burleigh (Episcopal Church)
  - John Gabriel Perboyre (one of Martyr Saints of China)
  - Leudinus (Bobo)
  - Our Lady of Coromoto
  - Paphnutius of Thebes (Roman Catholic Church)
  - Patiens of Lyon
  - Protus and Hyacinth
  - Sperandia
  - Theodora of Alexandria
  - September 11 (Eastern Orthodox liturgics)
- Death Anniversary of Quaid-e-Azam Muhammad Ali Jinnah (Pakistan)
- Emergency Number Day (United States)
- Enkutatash falls on this day if it is not a leap year. Celebrated on the first day of Mäskäräm. (Ethiopia, Eritrea, Rastafari)
- National Day (Catalonia)
- Nayrouz (Coptic Orthodox Church), September 12 on leap years.
- September 11 attacks-related observances (United States):
  - National Day of Service and Remembrance
  - Patriot Day
- Teachers' Day (Argentina)
