= Alexander Gianniris =

Eastern Orthodox bishop (1960–2023)

His Eminence Alexander
- Archbishop of Nigeria, Metropolitan of Nigeria, Niger, Benin, and Togo
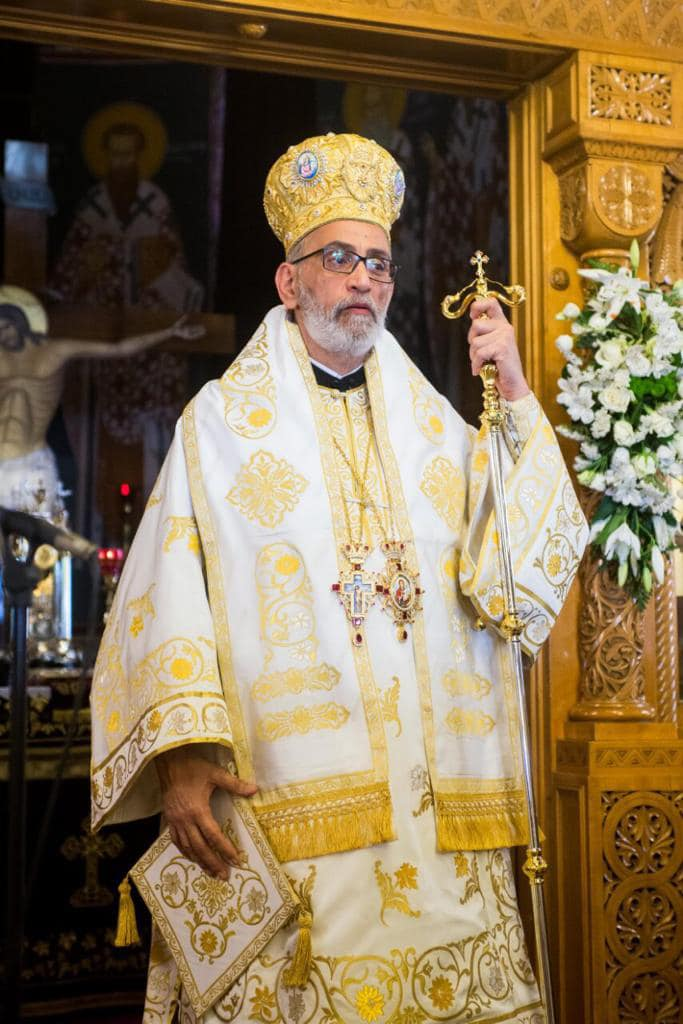
- Archdiocese: Orthodox Archdiocese of Nigeria
- Installed: 27 October 2004
- Term ended: 30 June 2023
- Successor: Nicodemus (Totkas)
- Other posts: Archbishop of Nigeria, Vicar and Exarch of the lands of Guinea Gulf

Orders
- Ordination: 1988 (Holy Diaconate), (Holy Priesthood)
- Consecration: 24 November 1997, 27 October 2004 (elevation to Archbishop and Metropolitan)
- Rank: Metropolitan

Personal details
- Born: Georgios Gianniris; 15 May 1960 Athens, Greece
- Died: 30 June 2023 (aged 63) Athens, Greece
- Denomination: Eastern Orthodox
- Residence: Lagos, Nigeria
- Education: University of Athens; University of Thessaloniki

Metropolitan Alexander (secular name Georgios Gianniris; 15 May 1960 – 30 June 2023) was an Eastern Orthodox Archbishop and Primate of the Orthodox Archdiocese of Nigeria, who held the rank of Metropolitan of Nigeria, Niger, Benin, and Togo, from 2004 till his death in 2023. He was appointed Metropolitan of the Orthodox Archdiocese of Nigeria on 27 October 2004, at Alexandria, Egypt.

== Early life and career ==
George Gianniris was born in Athens on 15 May 1960. He studied Agriculture at the University of Athens in Greece and studied Theology at the University of Thessaloniki in Greece. George also attended the liturgies of the Church of Greece with minor orders.

=== 1988–1997: Tenure as priest ===
On 1 October 1988, George was ordained deacon by Seraphim of Athens with the name of Alexandros (English: Alexander). On 2 October 1988, he was ordained a priest with the dignity of archimandrite. Between the tenures of Patriarchs Pathenios III and Petros VII of Alexandria, Alexander was transferred to the Patriarchate of Alexandria, serving as the Superior at the Patriarchal Church of the Holy Unmercenaries in the Archdiocese of Johannesburg in South Africa under Archbishop Paul (Lyngris) as secretary of the Archdiocese. Archimandrite Alexander was later appointed director of the Private Patriarchal Office in April 1997.

Alexander issued the bilingual magazine Orthodox Approach, and was responsible for the radio programs of the archdiocese.

=== 1997–2023: Tenure as bishop, archbishop, and metropolitan ===
On 23 September 1997, Archimandrite Alexander was elected bishop of the newly-formed Diocese of Nigeria under the Archdiocese of Cameroon and its hierarch, Patriarchal Vicar of Alexandria Theodore Horeftakis, later Patriarch of Alexandria. His consecration took place on 24 November 1997. He was elevated to the rank of Metropolitan Archbishop on 27 October 2004, by the decision of the Holy Synod and Patriarch Theodore II of Alexandria, who was crowned on 24 October 2004.

=== Other activities ===
Metropolitan Alexander was a member of the South African Institute of Byzantine and Modern Greek Studies, and the Holy Synod.

== Personal life ==
On 7 January 2021, the Archbishop tested positive for the COVID-19 a few moments before boarding an airplane from Lagos to Athens. On 26 March 2021 he advised Nigerians via Orthodox Times not to hesitate to get vaccinated.

== Death and burial ==
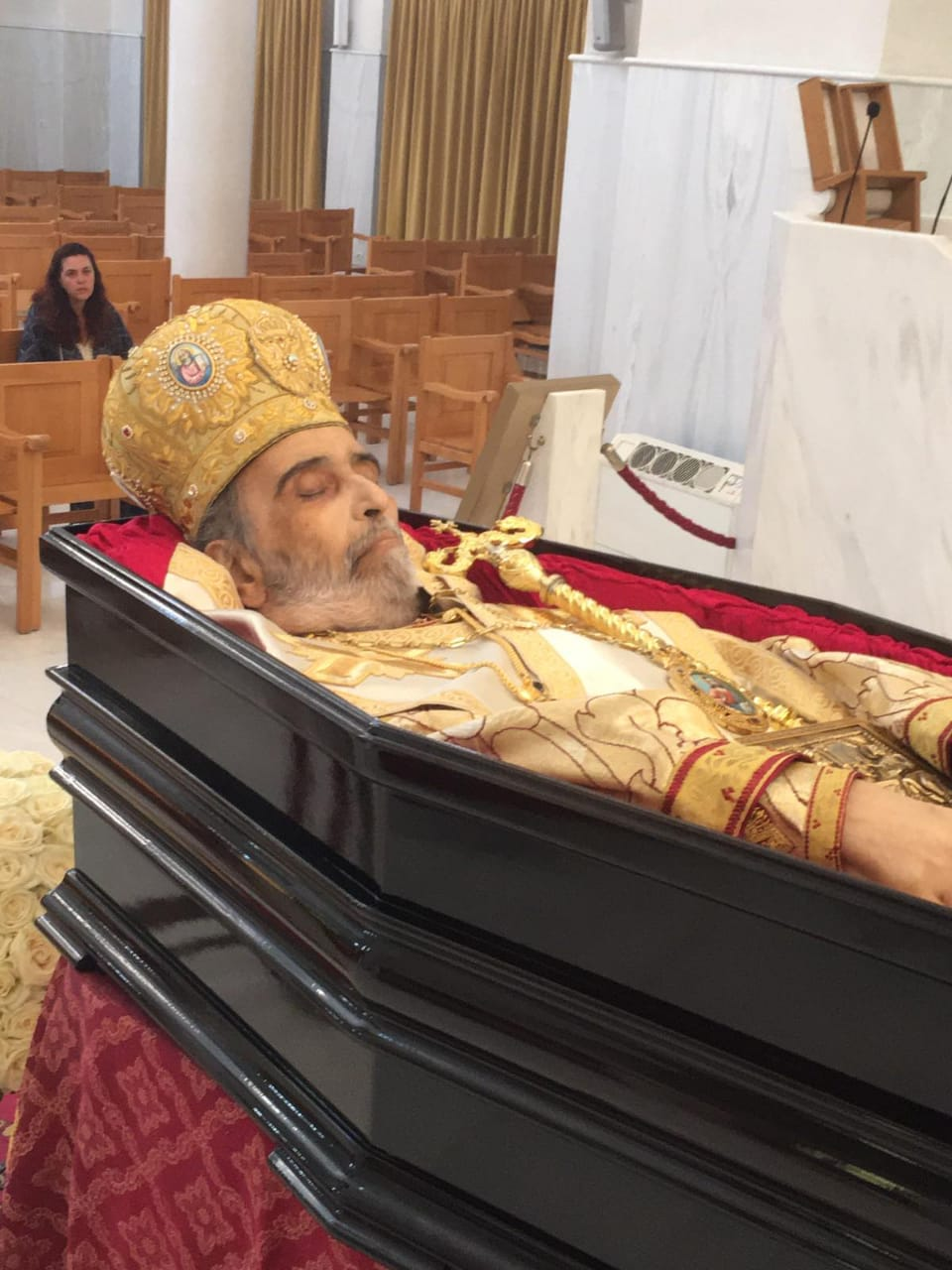
Archbishop Alexander in a coffin

In his final days, the Archbishop was seriously sick, and hospitalised in Greece, where he died on 30 June 2023, aged 63. His funeral was held on 1 July 2023 at the Monastery of St. Porphyrios in Milesi, Attica, Greece. In July 2023, a memorial service was held at the Cathedral in Lagos, Nigeria.

Eastern Orthodox Church titles
Preceded by	Bishop of Nigeria; 1997–2004	Succeeded by Nicodemus (Totkas)
Preceded by	Metropolitan Archbishop of Nigeria; 2004–2023	Succeeded by Nicodemus (Totkas)
