= Han Seung-oh =

Korean rights activist

Han Seung-oh (Korean: 한승오; Hanja: 韓昇旿; born 1978) was a South Korean civil activist and patriarchal advocate. He was one of founding members of Man of Korea (남성연대) also 2nd leader of Man of Korea, July 29, 2013 until August 14.

Han was born in Seoul. In 2008 he was a founding member of Man of Korea, also May 1, 2012, he was appointed to one Leader of General Affairs Team for Sung Jae-gi. On July 8 and July 22 he was Participation of Visit protest for Jecheon Women's Library with Sung Jae-gi. 8 month later, he was appointed to Secretary General of Man of Korea.

On July 25, 2013, he was nominated as successor to Sung Jae-gi, before his death. On July 26, 2013 Han was witness of Sung Jae-gi's suicide. He did not discourage him. After four days of investigation, the Seoul city police determined cleared him of any charge.

From July 26 to August 14, Han was Sung Jae-gi's funeral and case settled. but this did not rectify infighting so there was demand resignation from some member of Man of Korea. On August 21, 2013, he resigned.

== See also ==
- Sung Jae-gi
- Han Chi-hwan

Preceded by Sung Jae-gi	2nd Head of Korean male Association; July 29, 2013 – August 14, 2013	Succeeded by Kim In-seok (Acting)
