= Angry young man =

Angry young man or angry young men may refer to:

== Movements ==
=== China ===
- Fenqing, a Chinese slang term for young nationalists, literal translation "angry young men"

=== India ===
- Angry young man (India), refers to a series of film movements in Indian cinema that originated in Hindi cinema of the 1970s, and eventually spread to Tamil cinema, Telugu cinema, and Kannada cinema
- Angry Young Men (miniseries), 2024 Indian documentary about Salim-Javed.

=== Korea ===
- Idaenam (lit. 'man in his twenties'), anti-feminist young men in South Korea

=== United Kingdom ===
- Angry young men, a journalistic catchphrase applied to some British writers of the mid-1950s
- The Angry Young Men (book), a 2002 book about these writers by Humphrey Carpenter
- British New Wave or Angry Young Man Cinema, period of British cinema of the 1960s
- Kitchen sink realism, refers to a British cultural movement of plays, films, and novels centered around "angry young men"

== Songs ==
- "Fooling Yourself (The Angry Young Man)", a song by Styx
- "Prelude/Angry Young Man", a 1976 song/single by Billy Joel

== See also ==
- Angry man (disambiguation)
- Angry white male
