= Angry man =

Angry man may refer to:

- Angry white man
- Angry black man
- Angry Asian Man

== See also ==
- Angry black woman
- One Angry Man (disambiguation)
- Angry young man (disambiguation)
