= Orthodox Archdiocese of Nigeria =

Greek Orthodox Church of Nigeria

Greek Orthodox Church of Nigeria
- Greek Orthodox Church of Alexandria in Nigeria

Location
- Country: Nigeria
- Territory: Nigeria; Niger; Benin; Togo
- Ecclesiastical province: Greek Orthodox Church of Alexandria

Information
- Denomination: Greek Orthodox
- Established: 24 November 1997
- Cathedral: Resurrection of the Lord
- Patriarch: Theodore II
- Metropolitan Archbishop: Nicodemus (Totkas)

Website
- http://orthodoxnigeria.org/

The Orthodox Archdiocese of Nigeria (Greek: Ιερά Μητρόπολη Νιγηρίας), alternatively known as the Greek Orthodox Archdiocese of Nigeria, is an archdiocese of the Greek Orthodox Patriarchate of Alexandria in Nigeria with jurisdiction over Nigeria, Niger, Benin, and Togo. It was established in Lagos in 1997. The current Metropolitan Archbishop is Nicodemus Totkas.

== History ==
(left) Russian Cross and (right) Greek Cross

In 1966, the Orthodox Archdiocese of Nigeria was established as the first Orthodox community in Nigeria by Anastasios George Leventis. In the years thereafter, Leventis led construction of the first Orthodox Church, named Anastasios (Greek for “Resurrection”). On 24 November 1997, it became a diocese and was called “Resurrection of the Lord parish”.

The Greek Orthodox Church Nigeria is led by the Metropolitan, Archbishop Alexander Gianniris of Nigeria, Niger, Benin, and Togo. On 11 December 1998, the church became a registered entity of the Corporate Affairs Commission of Nigeria. In 1999, the Greek community handed over the parish to the Greek Orthodox Patriarch of Alexandria and all Africa.

The church was later demolished and rebuilt in 2017. On 30 June 2023, the Metropolitan, Archbishop Alexander Gianniris passed on and was buried on 1 July 2023, at the Monastery of St. Porphyrios in Milesi Attica, Athens, Greece. The Vicar General, Rev Fr. James Nwaba, in a statement released by the church, is to hold a memorial service in respect of the passing of the Archbishop.

On Wednesday, 5 July 2023, the Pope and Patriarch of Alexandria and All Africa, Theodore II appoint Metropolitan George of Guinea as temporary vicar, to lead the Orthodox Archdiocese of Nigeria, with its jurisdiction in West Africa, including Niger, Benin, and Togo. (Note: Pope and Patriarch of Alexandria and All Africa Theodore II, appoints Metropolitan George (Vladimirou) of Guinea as temporary vicar.) On 7 February 2024, the Patriarch of Alexandria Theodore II visited Nigeria. On 15 February 2024, the Holy Synod of the Patriarchate of Alexandria and All Africa, elected Nicodemus Totkas as the new Metropolitan Archbishop of the Archdiocese of Nigeria. (Note: the Holy Synod of the Patriarchate of Alexandria and All Africa, appoints a New Metropolitan for Nigeria.)

== Administrative structures ==
=== Archbishop ===
- Bishop, later Metropolitan Alexander (Gianniris) (1997–2023)
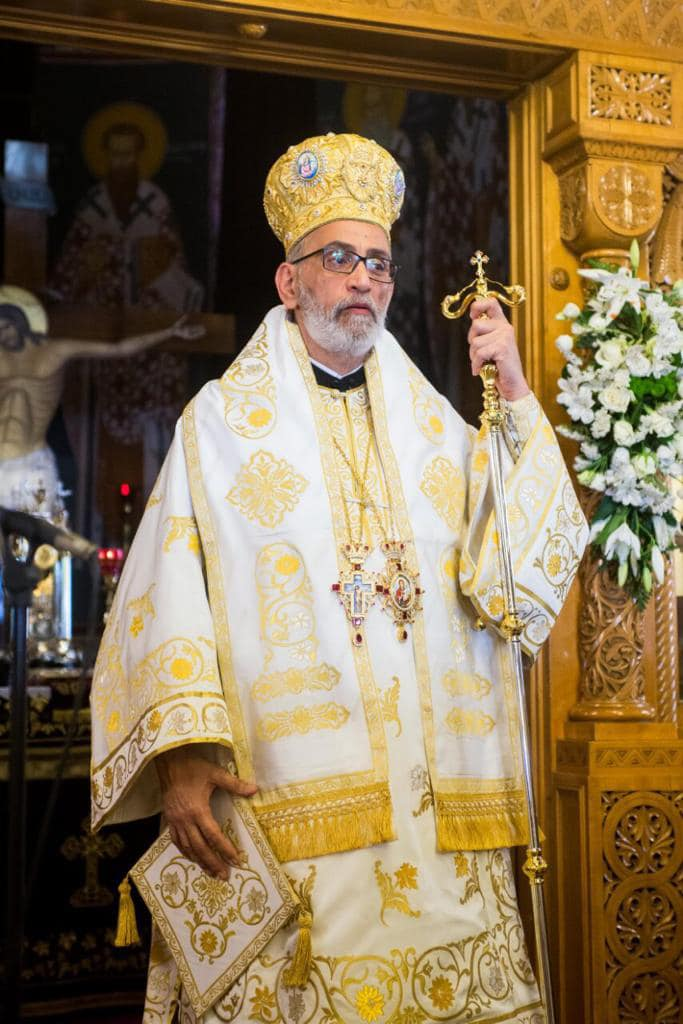
  Alexander Gianniris
- Metropolitan Nicodemus (Totkas) (2024–present)

== See also ==
- Russian Orthodox Church of Nigeria.
