= Nicodemus (Totkas) =

Eastern Orthodox bishop (born 1975)

His Eminence Nikodemus
- Archbishop of Nigeria
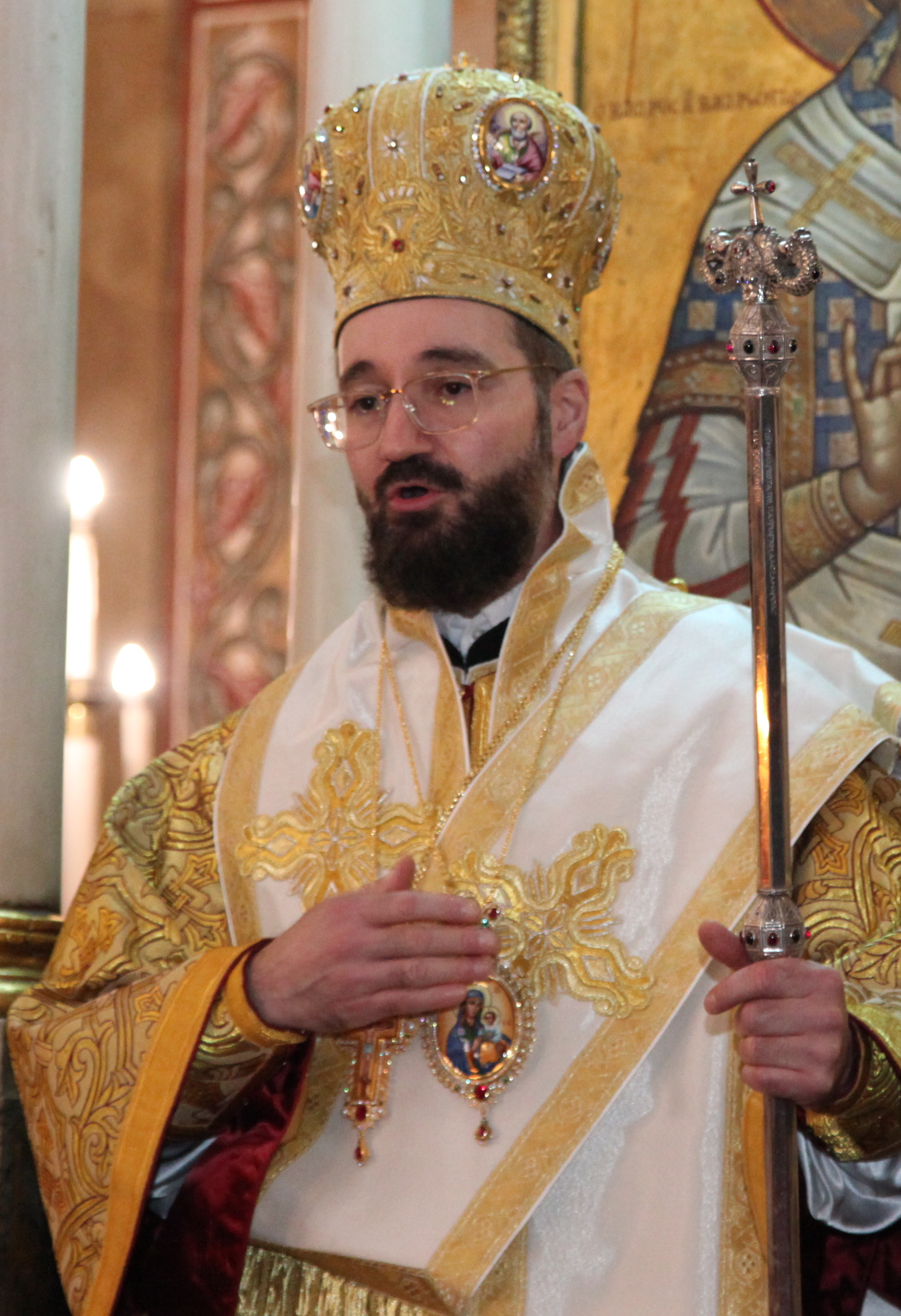
- Archdiocese: Orthodox Archdiocese of Nigeria
- Installed: 30 June 2024
- Predecessor: Alexander (Gianniris)
- Other post: Bishop of Nilopolis

Orders
- Ordination: 1999 (Holy Diaconate), (Holy Priesthood)
- Consecration: 15 February 2024
- Rank: Metropolitan Archbishop

Personal details
- Born: Dimitrios Totkas; 1975 (age 50–51) Berlin, Germany
- Denomination: Eastern Orthodox
- Parents: Kontantine Totkas (father); Eftychia Totkas (mother)
- Education: Berlin University of the Arts; National and Kapodistrian University of Athens

Metropolitan Nicodemus (born Dimitrios Totkas in 1975) is an Eastern Orthodox Archbishop, Vicar, and Primate of the Orthodox Church in West Africa, who currently holds the rank of Metropolitan of Nigeria since 2024. He formally served as the Auxiliary bishop of Nilopolis, titled The Once Glorious Bishop of Nilopolis, from 2022 to 2024. He was appointed Metropolitan Archbishop of the Orthodox Archdiocese of Nigeria on 15 February 2024, in Egypt. On 30 June 2024, he was enthroned with the Staff of office in Lagos, Nigeria.

== Early life and career ==
Dimitrios Totkas was born in Berlin, Germany in 1975, to Kontantine Totkas and Eftychia Totkas. He completed his elementary and high school in the German Schools. He graduated from the Berlin University of the Arts and holds a degree from the Department of Social Theology of the Theological Faculty of the National and Kapodistrian University of Athens.

=== 1999–2022: Tenure as Priest ===
Dimitrios was tonsured as a Monk and ordained Deacon in 1999, with the name Nikodemus by the late Metropolitan Ioannis (Papalis) of Sidirokastro. In 2004, he was ordained a Priest with the dignity of Archimandrite by His Eminence Macarius Metropolitan of Sidirokastro. In 2005, Nicodemus was transferred to the Holy Metropolis of Dimitriada and Almyros. Thereafter, he was seconded to the Holy Metropolis of Germany, where he served as Parish Priest of the Parishes of Berlin, Leipzig, and Aachen. In 2015, His Beatitude Theodoros II, elevated him to the Holy Metropolis of Johannesburg and Pretoria, where he served as Parish Priest at the Hellenic Community of Klerksdorp, South Africa. In January 2019, Nicodemus was invited by His Beatitude Theodoros II, to the See of the Patriarchate and joined the Clergy of the Patriarchal Court.

=== 2022–present: Tenure as Auxiliary bishop, Bishop, Archbishop, and Metropolitan ===
On 12 January 2022, following a proposal of His Beatitude, Theodoros II, Archimandrite Nicodemus was elected by the Holy Synod as an Auxiliary bishop, with the title of Bishop of Nilopolis.

In May 2022, at the direction of His Beatitude Pope and Patriarch Theodore II of Alexandria and All Africa, he was assigned to South Africa, where he served as Assistant Bishop of the Holy Metropolis of Johannesburg and Pretoria, while also carrying out missionary work in the Republic of Botswana.

On 30 June 2023, following the passing of Metropolitan Alexander Gianniris of the Orthodox Archdiocese of Nigeria, the Holy Synod of the Patriarchate of Alexandria and All Africa, elected Bishop Nicodemus Totkas as the new Metropolitan Archbishop of the Archdiocese of Nigeria. On 30 June 2024, Archbishop Nicodemus was enthroned with the Staff of office in Lagos, Nigeria.

=== Other activities ===
From 2004 to 2005, Nicodemus served as Dean of the Holy Metropolitan Church of St George in Sidirokastro. He was also in charge of Youth and collaborator of the camps of the Holy Metropolis of Sidirokastro. On 2 February 2019, following a proposal by the Alexandrian Primate, he was promoted and served as the Director of the Private Patriarchal Office. On 21 April 2019, he was appointed Chief Secretary of the Holy Synod.

Eastern Orthodox Church titles
Preceded by Alexander Gianniris	Bishop of Nigeria; 2024-present	Succeeded by
Preceded by Alexander Gianniris	Metropolitan Archbishop of Nigeria; 2024-present	Succeeded by
