= Mapo Bridge =

Bridge in Seoul, South Korea

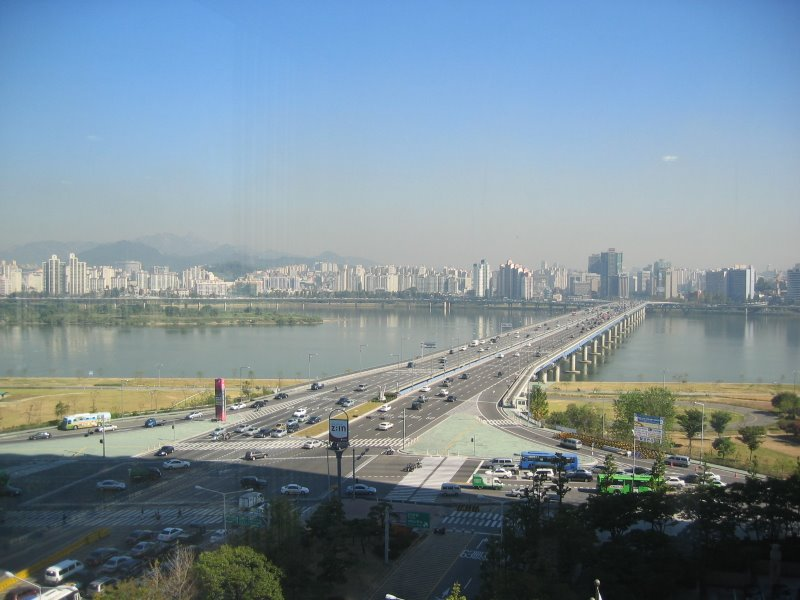
- Mapo Bridge
- Coordinates: 37°32′01″N 126°56′11″E
- Carries: 10 lanes of National Route 46
- Crosses: Han River
- Locale: Seoul, South Korea

Characteristics
- Design: Girder bridge
- Total length: 1,389 metres (4,557 ft)

History
- Construction end: 1970

Location
- Interactive map of Mapo Bridge

- Mapo Bridge
- Hangul: 마포대교
- Hanja: 麻浦大橋
- RR: Mapo daegyo
- MR: Map'o taegyo

The Mapo Bridge (Korean: 마포대교) crosses the Han River in South Korea and connects the Mapo District and the Yeongdeungpo District in the city of Seoul. Seoul Subway Line 5 also passes directly underneath the bridge through an underwater tunnel.

== History ==
The bridge started construction on February 29, 1968, and was opened on May 16, 1970, with the name of Seoul Bridge. The bridge's name was changed to the current Mapo Bridge on November 13, 1984. The bridge's traffic eventually increased leading to severe traffic jams, which spurred the construction of the neighboring Wonhyo Bridge, which then led to the further development of Yeouido.

The bridge was originally designed to be able to carry up to 32 metric tons per vehicle, but as vehicular traffic across Seoul increased, vehicles weighing over 40 tons were starting to use the bridge. This put significant pressure on the bridge's structure, and cracks on the deck slab and efflorescence of the concrete. Due to this, plans were set in 1993 for the bridge to be repaired.

However, the collapse of the Seongsu Bridge in 1994 led to every bridge on the Han River being inspected and repaired, and it was also decided that a new bridge would be constructed adjacent to the old bridge before it would be repaired. Construction of the new bridge commenced in December 1996 and was completed on June 30, 2000, with vehicular traffic being allowed starting from July 3rd of the same year. With the opening of the new bridge, the old bridge was closed for repairs that included reconstructing the entire upper portion, and it was re-opened on October 17, 2005, as the 2nd Mapo Bridge.

== Suicides ==
The suicide rate is very high in South Korea and bridge jumping is common. Mapo Bridge has a reputation of jumpers with over 100 attempts between 2007 and 2012.

On July 26, 2013, Sung Jae-ki jumped off Mapo Bridge in an attempt to draw attention to gender inequality against men and a plea to accrue needed funds for "Men of Korea". Although rescue work began almost immediately after he fell and a widespread search of the Han River was conducted, it took three days to retrieve his body.

In September 2012, Samsung Life Insurance and Cheil Worldwide attempted to deter suicides on the bridge by adding pictures, words, and a statue that were intended to foster an encouraging atmosphere. For instance, the bridge's handrails were equipped with motion sensors to sense movement, lighting up with short phrases, written with the help of suicide prevention groups, also showing photos of happy families among other things. The bridge was given the nickname "Bridge of Life". Suicide attempts increased in the following years, from 11 attempts in 2011 (before installation) and 15 in 2012 (the year it was installed) to 184 in 2014, due in part to heightened publicity. However, deaths remained steady at 5-6 each year.

Such measures were deemed to be a failure in 2015. Samsung eventually replaced the lights with barriers in a return to a more physical approach to suicide prevention by October. Some slogans remained until 2019, which included phrases that featured "questionable choices of words like, 'Try it, then' and 'Hahahahahaha.'"

The existing 1.5m tall barriers were extended by another meter in 2016, and in 2022, AI monitoring was introduced. Following the extension of barriers, the number of attempts decreased in 2017, and all were prevented or rescued in 2022.

== Gallery ==
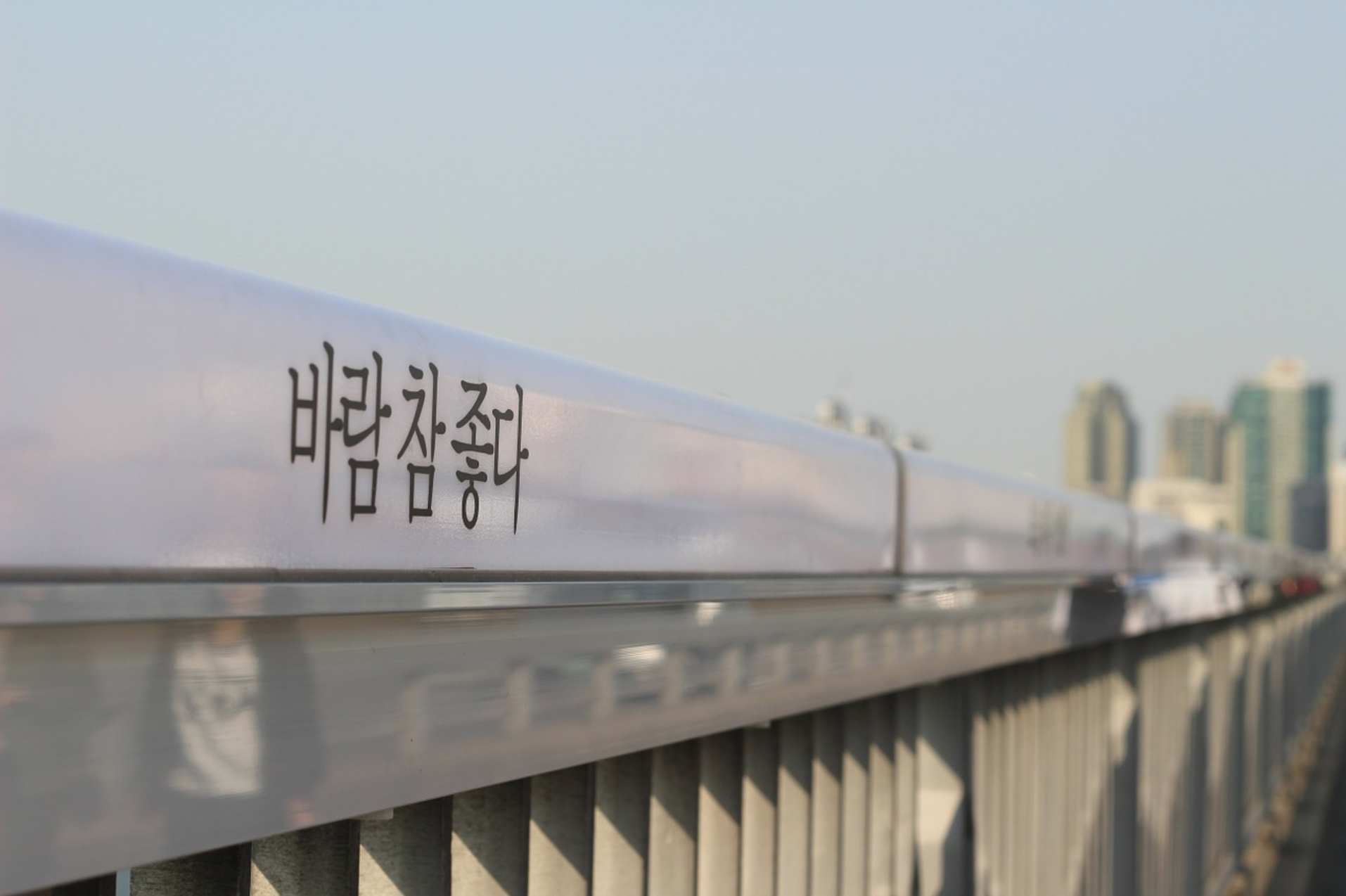
The phrase on the handrail pictured reads "the wind is really nice."

== See also ==
- Sung Jae-ki
