= The Inklings (book) =

1978 book by Humphrey Carpenter

The Inklings: C.S. Lewis, J.R.R. Tolkien, Charles Williams, and Their Friends
- Author: Humphrey Carpenter
- Publisher: George Allen and Unwin
- Publication date: 1978
- Pages: 287
- ISBN: 0048090115

The Inklings: C.S. Lewis, J.R.R. Tolkien, Charles Williams, and Their Friends is a collective biography by Humphrey Carpenter, published in 1978 by George Allen and Unwin. It is an account of the Inklings, a literary discussion group associated with the University of Oxford of which J.R.R. Tolkien, C.S. Lewis, and Charles Williams were prominent members.

== Contents ==
In the book, Carpenter argues that what brought and kept the group together for nearly six years was each member's personal friendship with C.S. Lewis, rather than a shared interest in Christianity, myth, and literature. As such, much of the book is organised around the life of Lewis, with less discussion of J. R. R. Tolkien, whom Carpenter had previously covered in-depth in J. R. R. Tolkien: A Biography. A central premise is that the Inklings' meetings at Magdalen College and local pubs, and their complex personal relationships, helped to shape major literary works, including The Lord of the Rings and Lewis's writings.

The book includes writings by Tolkien and other group members, such as a Tolkien poem to Charles Williams or letters by Williams.

Chapter listing:

- Part One
  - "Oh for the people who speak one's own language"
  - "What? You too?"
  - Mythopoeia
  - "The sort of thing a man might say"
- Part Two
  - C.W.
  - "A tremendous flow of words"
- Part Three
  - "They are good for my mind"
  - "We had nothing to say to one another"
  - Thursday evenings
  - "A fox that isn't there"
  - "Hwaet! we Inclinga"
- Part Four
  - "No one turned up"
  - Till We Have Faces
- Appendices
  - A. Biographical notes
  - B. Bibliography
  - C. Sources of quotations
  - D. Acknowledgements

== Publication history ==
UK editions

- George Allen and Unwin hardcover (1978), pp. 287. ISBN 978-0-04-809011-9
- Unwin Paperbacks paperback (1981), ISBN 978-0-04-809013-3
- HarperCollins paperback (1997), ISBN 978-0-261-10347-4
- HarperCollins paperback (2006), ISBN 978-0-00-774869-3
- HarperCollins paperback (2024) ISBN 978-0-00-774869-3

== Reception ==
=== Reviews ===
Upon the book's release, reviews of The Inklings by literary critics and scholars were positive. Most reviewers praised Humphrey Carpenter's efforts to provide a balanced portrait of the group's members – describing their "virtues", while also exploring the nuances of their socially conservative, apolitical, and controversial views about modern writers and women.

In his 1997 review for The Guardian, Nicholas Lezard wrote that "Carpenter [...] pulls off the remarkable feat of keeping you interested in the company of men one would not, perhaps, have chosen as friends in real life". Lezard described Carpenter's chapter depicting an imaginary Inklings session in Part III as "an imagined, but plausible, reconstruction of one of their evenings" – a section which scholar Margaret Hannay, in a separate review, called "brilliant".

In his 1979 New York Times review, literary critic Christopher Ricks said, "The last 20 pages of this book brought tears to my eyes, which was the last thing I had expected." Describing Carpenter as "open-minded and open-handed", he commended the author's "fresh eye for the small comedies and the even smaller tragedies of university life, of college collusion and faculty fracas". He praised the book's insights into academic politics and the Inklings' influence on curricular "reforms" at Oxford, which had resulted in the exclusion of post-1830 literature from the syllabus. More generally, Ricks said that Carpenter succeeded in evoking "a whetted interest in the lives and characters of this notable set of right-wing Christians", placing Lewis at the center of the "mutual-admiration society" and offering anecdotes, many of which "worked to confirm a distrust of the Inklings". Turning to the book's final section, which recounts C. S. Lewis's late-in-life marriage to Joy Davidman, Ricks describes Carpenter's description of Lewis' unexpected love, happiness, and bereavement as deeply affecting, arguing that it provides readers with "an extraordinary change of perspective".

Also in 1979, Margaret Hannay reviewed The Inklings for Christianity & Literature. She described the book as "remarkable for its graceful handling of complex material and for its generally balanced presentation of these men who are usually either revered or reviled". According to Hannay, "The most surprising revelation is the darker side of Charles Williams", including his fascination with power, the occult, and "inflicting pain". Carpenter, she wrote, dispels the depiction of Williams' marriage to Florence Conway as "idyllic" by putting his "magnificently romantic letters" to her side by side with letters he wrote to his young female admirers, which paint a "profoundly disturbing" picture. At the same time, she credited Carpenter for also describing Williams' virtues, going as far as to argue that Lewis himself was such an avid champion of Williams, it made Tolkien jealous. While pointing out that the book's claim that it is based "largely on unpublished material" is slightly exaggerated, she acknowledged that "it does present significant material not yet available in print elsewhere", but lamented the work's lack of any secondary bibliography.

In 1980, David Greenwood reviewed The Inklings for the National Forum, noting that Carpenter used unpublished letters of Charles Williams, personal recollections, and archival materials to give the book an immediacy and authority unavailable in earlier accounts. According to Greenwood, Carpenter was particularly strong in tracing the complex personal relationships within the group, especially the mutual influence between Lewis and Tolkien and the distinctive role played by Charles Williams. Greenwood acknowledged that some of Carpenter's interpretations—particularly his assessments of Lewis's later literary success and his comparative evaluation of Williams—would likely be controversial. Despite these reservations, he concluded that The Inklings is a persuasive and engaging portrait of the group and an important contribution to Tolkien and Lewis studies.

In 2001 Wojciech Chudziński, reviewing the Polish translation of The Inklings for Świat Gier Komputerowych, described the importance of the group's meetings during which they read and discussed drafts of their works, offering critiques and encouragement in an atmosphere of friendship and shared imagination. According to Chudziński, these gatherings helped shape works such as Tolkien's Middle-earth legendarium and Lewis's Chronicles of Narnia. Chudziński highlighted Carpenter's credentials as a biographer of Tolkien and praised the book for its insights into the creative processes, personal relationships, and mutual influences within the group. He recommended The Inklings as a valuable contribution to understanding of how literary friendship and collaboration contributed to some of the most influential fantasy literature of the twentieth century.

=== Awards ===
In 1978 it won the Somerset Maugham Award for Best Biography. Few years later, in 1982, Humphrey Carpenter won a Mythopoeic Award for this book.

== See also ==
- J.R.R. Tolkien: A Biography
