= Han Chi-hwan =

Han Chi-hwan (Korean: 한지환; Hanja: 韓志煥; born October 28, 1984) is a South Korean human rights activist and civil rights activist, liberalist, and masculism activist. He is one of South Korea's anti-feminists.

He is one of the commentators opposing the "abolition of military bonus points" (군 가산점, 軍加算點) and woman's gender quota systems (여성 할당제, 女性割當制) in South Korea, along with Sung Jae-ki and Chung Chae-ki.

== Life ==
Han Chi-hwan was born in Mokdong in Seoul. During his early years, Han was an internet netizen engaged in columnist activity. In the 2000s he was an anti-feminist and fought discrimination based on sex with Sung Jae-ki, Chung Chae-ki and Kim Jae-kyong. He also opposed radical feminism and female chauvinism.

In 1999, he was opposed to the abolition of military bonus points. He argued that woman are able to perform military service. "Denied women's military service" is "gender discrimination" in his eyes. In 2003, he was joint and appointed to the club of military service Gender equality (남녀공동 병역의무 추진위원회). but he left one year later. In 2004, he was engaged in ideological study and became a successor of Chung Chae-ki.

In the early 2000s he opposed the movement to form a "woman's gender quota system" (여성 가산점) in South Korea. Han was said to more repeatedly point out, women have equal abilities and conditions like men have and develop the same abilities when educated. In 2004 to January 2005, he was favouring abolition of the hoju system, because he regarded it a vestige of Korean patriarchy.

== Books ==
- "Feminism for the Masculism and Men's Rights Movements" (페미니즘에 대한 남성학과 남성운동; 2007)

== See also ==
- Jeon Won-chak
- Angry young man (South Korea)

== Sources ==
- 이젠 남성학에 대해 이야기할 차례다 세계일보 2007.07.13
- 절름발이 페미니즘과 성별 이데올로기 덕성여대신문 2010.01.05
- 남자들은 모른다고? 여자들이 모르는 것도 많아! 조선일보 2007.07.17
- [언니 페미니즘] 남성들이 보내는 편지 경향신문 2007-07-12
- 남성권익운동, 필요惡 논란만 키웠다 아시아경제 2013.07.31
- [자유여론] 시간과 인력을 낭비한 절름발이 여론조사 – 한지환(법학ㆍ2) 숭실대학교 학보 [981호] 2008년 10월 14일자
