= Humphrey Carpenter =

English writer and broadcaster (1946–2005)

- Born: Humphrey William Bouverie Carpenter; 29 April 1946; Oxford, England
- Died: 4 January 2005 (aged 58); Oxford, England
- Education: Keble College, Oxford
- Occupations: Writer, biographer and broadcaster
- Writing career
- Notable works: J. R. R. Tolkien: A Biography; Mr Majeika

Humphrey William Bouverie Carpenter (29 April 1946 – 4 January 2005) was an English biographer, writer, and radio broadcaster. He is known especially for his biographies of J. R. R. Tolkien and other members of the literary society the Inklings. He won a Mythopoeic Award for his book The Inklings in 1982.

== Early life ==
Humphrey Carpenter was born in the city of Oxford, England. His father was Harry Carpenter, Bishop of Oxford. His mother was Urith Monica Trevelyan, who had training in the Fröbel teaching method. As a child, he lived in the Warden's Lodgings at Keble College, Oxford, where his father served as warden until his appointment as Bishop of Oxford. He was educated at the Dragon School, Oxford and Marlborough College. He returned to Oxford to read English at Keble College.

== Broadcasting ==
Carpenter began his broadcasting career at BBC Radio Oxford as a presenter and producer. They jointly produced A Thames Companion in 1975. He hosted Radio 3's arts discussion programme Night Waves and acted as a regular presenter of other programmes on the network including Radio 3's afternoon drivetime programme In Tune and, until it was discontinued, its Sunday request programme Listeners' Choice. Until his death, he presented the BBC Radio 4 biography series Great Lives recorded in Bristol. The last edition recorded before his death featured an interview with the singer Eddi Reader about the poet Robert Burns, the major focus of her creative work. BBC Radio 4 broadcast this programme on New Year's Eve, 2004.

== Jazz music and children's drama ==
Carpenter was an amateur jazz musician who played the piano, the saxophone, and the double-bass, the last instrument professionally in a dance band in the 1970s. In 1983, he formed a 1930s style jazz band, Vile Bodies, which for many years enjoyed a residency at the Ritz Hotel in London. He also founded the Mushy Pea Theatre Group, a children's drama group based in Oxford, which premiered his Mr Majeika: The Musical in 1991 and Babes, a musical about Hollywood child stars.

== Children's books ==
He wrote the Mr Majeika series of children's books; these were later adapted for television. The Joshers: Or London to Birmingham with Albert and Victoria (1977) is a children's adventure book, similar in style to The Railway Children and based on the adventure of taking a working narrowboat up the Grand Union Canal from London to Birmingham.

== Non-fiction works ==
Carpenter's biographies included J. R. R. Tolkien: A Biography (1977; also editing of The Letters of J. R. R. Tolkien), The Inklings: CS Lewis, JRR Tolkien, Charles Williams and their Friends (1978; winner of the 1978 Somerset Maugham Award), W. H. Auden (1981), Ezra Pound (1988; winner of the Duff Cooper Memorial Prize), Evelyn Waugh (1989), Benjamin Britten (1992), Robert Runcie (1997), Dennis Potter, and Spike Milligan (2004). He authored Geniuses Together: American Writers in Paris in the 1920s (1987); his last book was The Seven Lives of John Murray (2008) about John Murray and the publishing house of Albemarle Street; it was published posthumously.

He wrote histories of BBC Radio 3, the British satire boom of the 1960s, Angry Young Men: A Literary Comedy of the 1950s (2002), and a centennial history of the Oxford University Dramatic Society in 1985. Carpenter's account of the period of Edward Lear, Lewis Carroll, A. A. Milne and Frances Hodgson Burnett, Secret Gardens, was published in 1985. He edited The Oxford Companion to Children's Literature (1984) jointly with his wife, Mari Prichard.

== Family life ==
Carpenter married Mari Prichard, daughter of the poet Caradog Prichard, in 1973; the marriage produced two daughters.

He died in 2005 of heart failure, compounded by the Parkinson's disease from which he had suffered for several years. He was buried in Wolvercote Cemetery in Oxford, also the final resting place of J. R. R. Tolkien. A commemorative stained-glass window was installed in St Margaret's Institute, Polstead Road, honouring Carpenter's many accomplishments.

== Selected works ==
- A Thames Companion (with Mari Prichard; Oxford Illustrated, 1975)
- The Joshers; or London to Birmingham with Albert and Victoria: A Story of the Canals (George Allen & Unwin, 1977)
- J. R. R. Tolkien: A Biography (George Allen & Unwin, 1977)
- The Inklings: C. S. Lewis, J. R. R. Tolkien, Charles Williams and Their Friends (George Allen & Unwin, 1978)
- Jesus (Past Masters Series; Oxford University Press, 1980)
- W. H. Auden. A Biography (George Allen & Unwin, 1981)
- The Letters of J. R. R. Tolkien (editor; George Allen & Unwin, 1981)
- The Oxford Companion to Children's Literature (with Mari Prichard; Oxford University Press, 1984)
- O.U.D.S.: A Centenary History of the Oxford University Dramatic Society (Oxford University Press, 1985)
- Secret Gardens: A Study of the Golden Age of Children's Literature (George Allen & Unwin, 1985)
- Geniuses Together: American Writers in Paris in the 1920s (Unwin Hyman, 1987)
- A Serious Character: Ezra Pound (Faber & Faber, 1988)
- The Brideshead Generation: Evelyn Waugh and His Friends (Weidenfeld & Nicolson, 1989)
- Benjamin Britten. A Biography (Faber & Faber, 1992)
- Shakespeare, Without the Boring Bits (Viking Children's Books, 1994)
- The Puffin Book of Classic Children's Stories (Viking Children's Books, 1996)
- Robert Runcie: The Reluctant Archbishop (Hodder & Stoughton, 1996)
- The Envy of the World: Fifty Years of the BBC Third Programme and Radio 3 (Weidenfeld & Nicolson, 1996)
- Dennis Potter. The Authorized Biography (Faber & Faber, 1998)
- That Was Satire That Was: Beyond the Fringe, the Establishment Club, Private Eye and That Was the Week That Was (Gollancz, 2000)
  - (US edition) A Great, Silly Grin: The British Satire Boom of the 1960s (PublicAffairs, 2002)
- The Angry Young Men: A Literary Comedy of the 1950s (Allen Lane, 2002)
- Spike Milligan. The Biography (Hodder & Stoughton, 2003)
- The Seven Lives of John Murray: The Story of a Publishing Dynasty (John Murray, 2008)
