= Hyōgen no jiyū senshi =

Japanese Internet slang

Hyōgen no jiyū senshi (表現の自由戦士, lit. 'Freedom of expression warrior') are netizens in Japan who defend freedom of expression with anti-feminism, anti-left, pro-otaku, pro-pornography ideological leanings.

== Origins ==
The term originated from social justice warriors and was initially used pejoratively to describe those opposed to progressive views. Eventually, influencers, including Aron Seishiki, who was held liable in court for slandering feminist Yumi Ishikawa, began to use the term to refer to themselves.

== Views ==
Hyōgen no jiyū senshi often act as a counter-protester when there are protests on Japanese social media about the representation of women in manga, anime, and games, and they take the side of creators and anime production companies by coming together to express support for freedom of expression. They cite Article 21 of the Japanese Constitution as the basis for their argument, and argue that these media creations, including hentai, should be protected to the maximum extent possible. They call their opponents Twifemi (ツイフェミ, lit. 'Twitter feminists'), mobilize cancel culture against otaku culture, and try to explain why attempts to censor expression are wrong. This controversial movement often escalates into smear campaigns and legal battles against feminists.

They also oppose political correctness and believe that people should speak their true, honest thoughts as human beings. Naoya Fujita, an associate professor at the Japan Institute of the Moving Image, called them freedom of expression fundamentalists.

== History ==
Hyōgen no jiyū senshi have been active since around 2014. They have fought against feminists who claim that advertisements are sexist in cases such as the creation of a poster for No-Rin in Minokamo, Gifu in November 2015, the use of Kizuna AI on the NHK website in October 2018, the depiction of Uzaki-chan Wants to Hang Out! on a poster for the Japanese Red Cross Society in October 2019, the depiction of characters from Love Live! Sunshine!! on a poster in Numazu, Shizuoka in February 2020, and the depiction of characters from Tawawa on Monday on an advertisement in the Nikkei in April 2022. The movement is seen as part of a culture war in Japan.

With Ken Akamatsu in mind, Shuichiro Sarashina said that the Hyōgen no jiyū senshi elected a moe manga artist in order to reflect their views in politics. In 2022 Japanese House of Councillors election, Akamatsu ran on the principle of freedom of expression in his election campaign and won with 528,053 votes from across the country.

== See also ==
- Idaenam
- Netto-uyoku
- Anti-censorship
