= Agarathos Monastery =

Greek Orthodox monastery in Crete

- Μονή Αγκαράθου
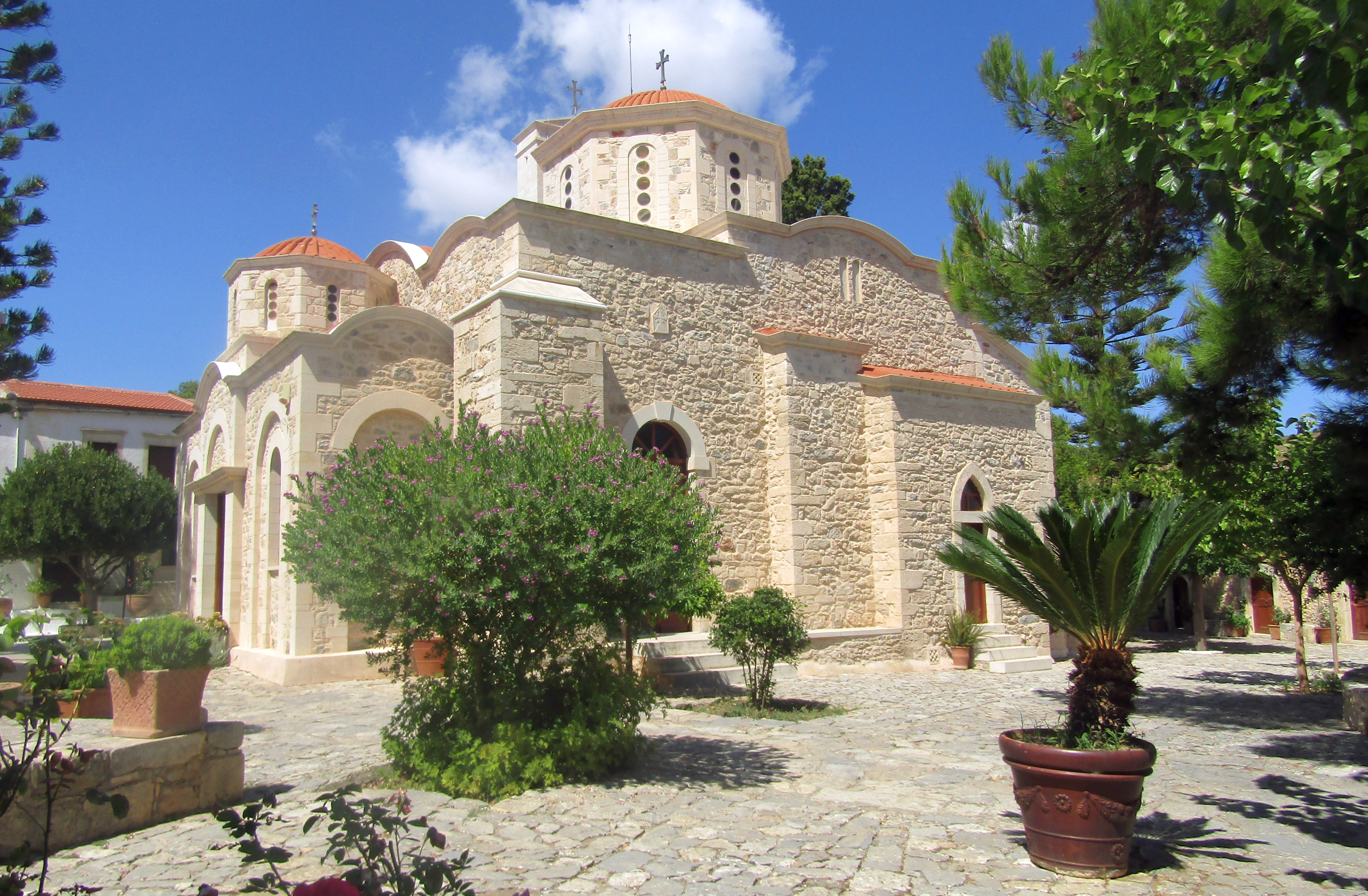

- Location of the monastery in Crete
- Interactive map of Agarathos Monastery

Monastery information
- Full name: Holy Monastery of the Assumption of the Virgin Mary
- Order: Ecumenical Patriarchate of Constantinople
- Denomination: Greek Orthodox
- Dedication: Dormition of the Virgin Mary
- Celebration: August 15: Dormition
- Archdiocese: Church of Crete

Architecture
- Status: Monastery
- Functional status: Active
- Style: Byzantine
- Completion date: c. Second Byzantine period (961–1205)

Site
- Location: Sgourokefali, Episkopi, Heraklion, Crete
- Country: Greece
- Coordinates: 35°13′38″N 25°14′58″E

The Agarathos Monastery (Greek: Μονή Αγκαράθου), officially the Holy Monastery of the Assumption of the Virgin Mary, is a Greek Orthodox monastery situated near the village of Sgourokefali (part of Episkopi municipal unit) in the Heraklion region of central Crete, Greece. It is built in a lush green location that is 538 metres (1,765 ft) above sea level, approximately 24 kilometres (15 mi) east of the city of Heraklion.

== History ==
The Agarathos Monastery is one of the oldest monasteries in Crete; however, its exact date of establishment is not known. Most probably, it was established during the second Byzantine period, between 961 and 1205, and originally belonged to the Kallergis family. According to tradition, it received its name from a Jerusalem sage bush (agarathia in the Cretan dialect), under which an old icon of Virgin Mary was found. The earliest written reference to the monastery dates from 1532 and the Venetian period. During that time, Agarathos was a very wealthy monastery, with many of its monks originating from Kythira. During the Ottoman occupation of Crete, the monastery often served as a local revolutionary center and suffered several retaliatory attacks as a result. Several important figures, among which Cyril Lucaris, Meletius Pegas, Joseph Bryennios, Gerasimos Palaiokapas and Theodore of Alexandria, have been enrolled as monks at Agarathos.

The Agarathos Monastery functions as a male monastery and according to the 2001 census, it had 19 monks. Storerooms and the old olive mill at the monastery were converted into a church museum.

== Architecture ==
Agarathos monastery is built with a fortified architecture. The main building (katholikon) is a two-nave church that was erected on the location of an older one and was inaugurated in 1894. One nave is dedicated to Kimisis and the other to St. Minas. In 1935, the church was declared as a preservable monument. An old church dedicated to St. Raphael is located outside the courtyard.

== Gallery ==
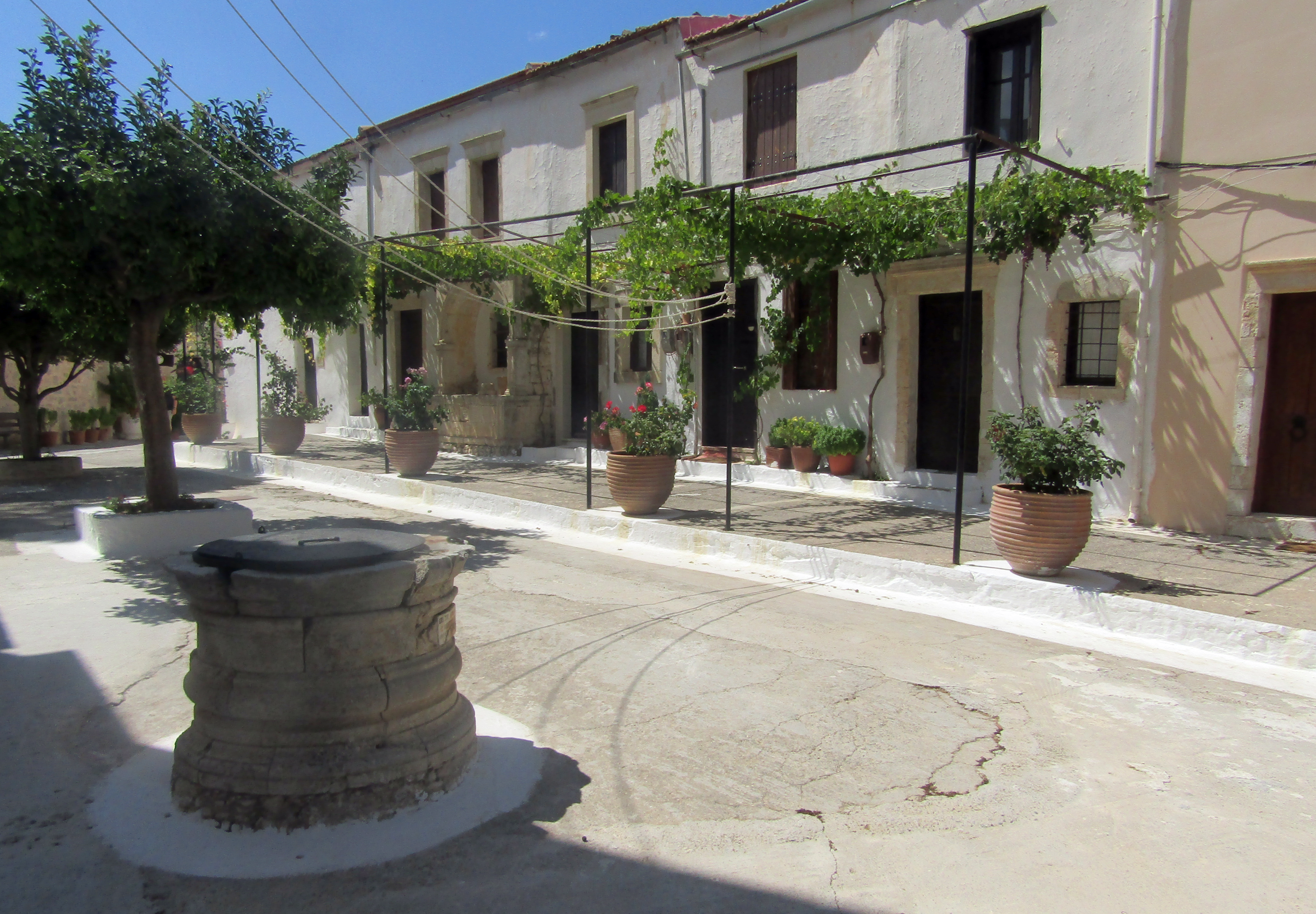
The courtyard with the whell and some monk's cells

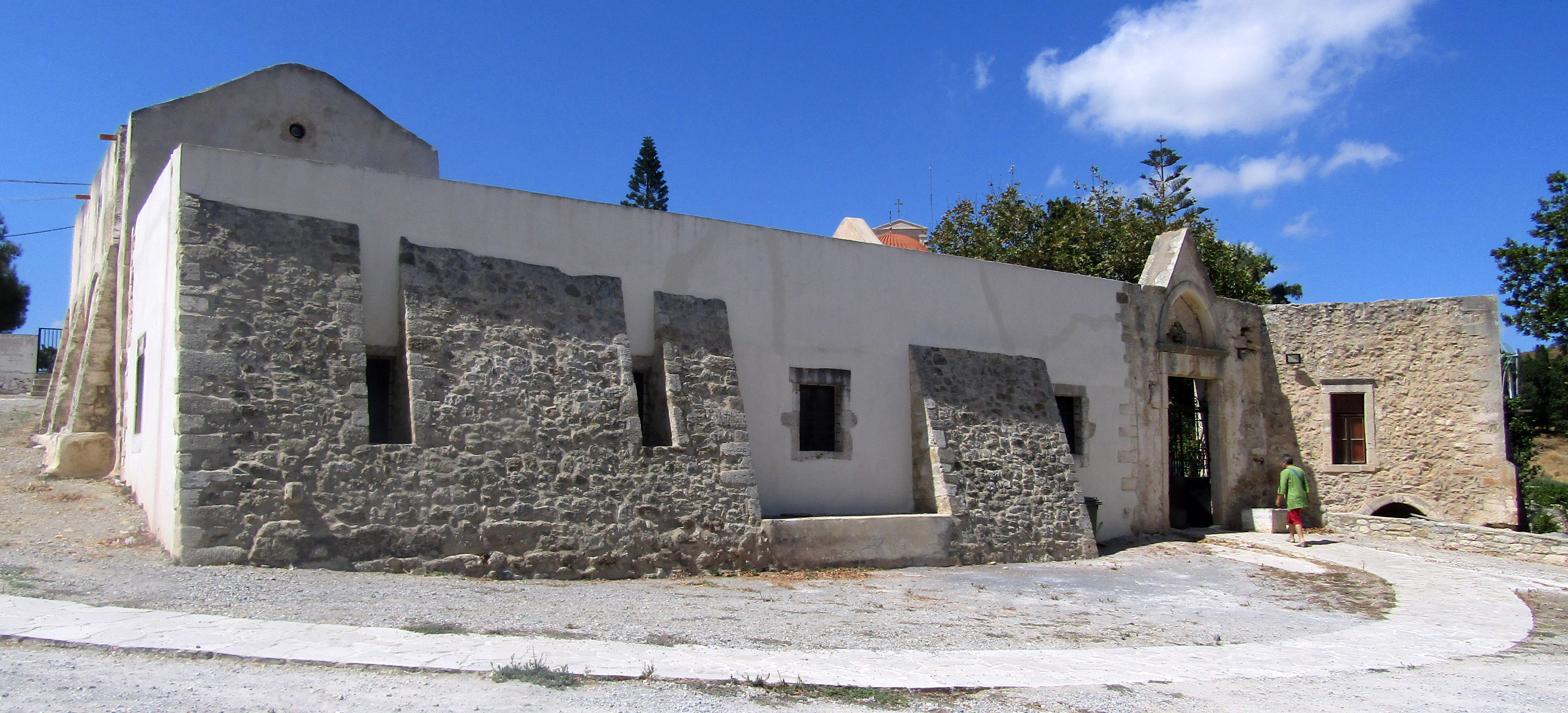
External walls

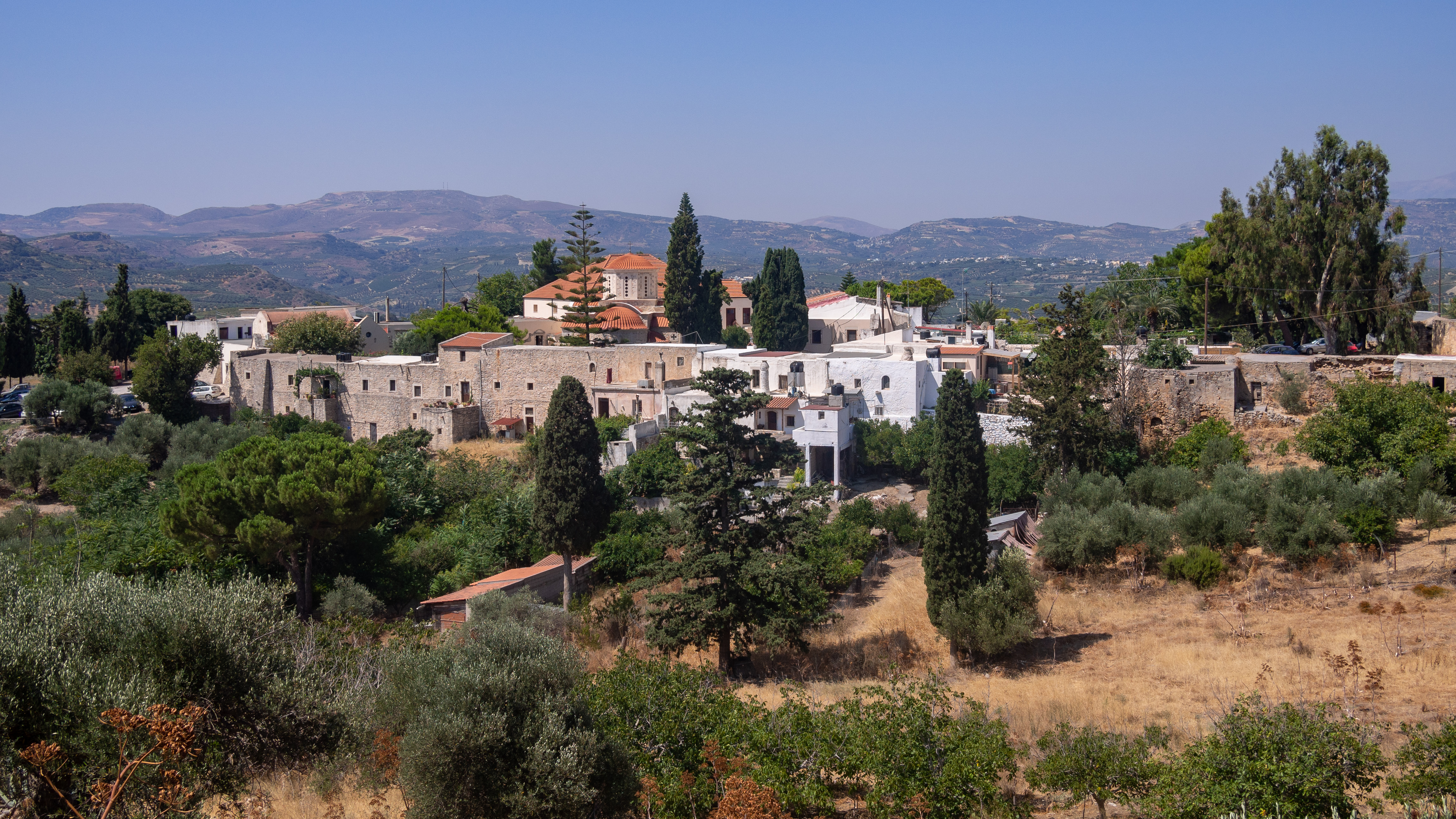
Overall view

== See also ==
- Church of Crete
- List of Greek Orthodox monasteries in Greece
