= The Angry Young Men (book) =

2002 book by Humphrey Carpenter

- Author: Humphrey Carpenter
- Language: English
- Subject: Angry young men
- Publisher: Allen Lane
- Publication date: 2002
- Publication place: United Kingdom
- Pages: 243
- ISBN: 9780713995329

The Angry Young Men: A Literary Comedy of the 1950s is a 2002 book by the English writer Humphrey Carpenter. It is about a group of British writers who came to prominence in the mid to late 1950s, and were referred to as the angry young men. The group included Kingsley Amis, Philip Larkin, John Osborne, Colin Wilson, John Braine, Stan Barstow, John Wain, and Keith Waterhouse.

The subtitle refers to the angry young men as an ephemeral mass-media phenomenon, which largely consisted of a series of farcical anecdotes about the writers who were given the label. According to Carpenter, a major challenge when writing the book was that he remained unsure of whether the group ever existed beyond being a label in the tabloid press.
