= One Angry Man =

One angry Man may refer to:

- One Angry Man (film), a 2010 film starring Jackie Mason and directed by Peter LeDonne and Steven Moskovic
- "One Angry Man", episode 24 in Series 5 of Judge John Deed
- "One Angry Man", season 1, episode 24 of The Dick Van Dyke Show
- "One Angry Man – TRIAL", episode 10 in Ghost in the Shell: S.A.C. 2nd GIG
