= Margaret Hannay =

Margaret P. Hannay (1944–2016) was an American scholar of Elizabethan literature and author of 17 books. She was professor and head of the English department at Siena College, where she taught from 1980 to 2013. Her best known works included Philip's Phoenix: Mary Sidney, Countess of Pembroke (1990) and Mary Sidney, Lady Wroth (2010).

Hannay was also a noted editor of the work of poet and playwright Mary Sidney. In 1985, she published a collection of essays, Silent but for the Word: Tudor Women As Patrons, Translators, and Writers of Religious Works (1985), which was considered "pioneering in its serious treatment of the writings of early modern women". She was the founder and former president of the Society for the Study of Early Modern Women and former president of the International Sidney Society, both of which awarded her lifetime achievement awards.

== Selected works ==
Works as author

- Hannay, Margaret P. (1981). C.S. Lewis. Frederick Ungar Publishing Company. ISBN 978-0804423410.
- Hannay, Margaret P. (2009). C.S. Lewis: A Map of his Worlds. Wipf and Stock. ISBN 978-1606084106.

Works as an editor

- Hannay, Margaret P., ed. (1979). As Her Whimsey Took Her : Critical Essays on the Work of Dorothy L. Sayers. Kent State University Press. ISBN 978-0873382274.
- Hannay, Margaret P., ed. (2001). Teaching Tudor and Stuart Women Writers. Options for Teaching. Modern Language Association of America. ISBN 978-0873523479.
- Hannay, Margaret P., ed. (2004). Ashgate Research Companion to the Sidneys, 1500-1700: Lives. Vol. 1. Routledge. ISBN 978-1032920764.
- Hannay, Margaret P., ed. (2004). Ashgate Research Companion to the Sidneys, 1500-1700: Literature. Vol. 2. Routledge. ISBN 978-1032098395.
- Hannay, Margaret P., ed. (2005). Selected Works of Mary Sidney Herbert, Countess of Pembroke. Arizona State University, Arizona Center for Medieval & Renaissance Studies. ISBN 978-0866983334.
