= Patriarch Peter VII of Alexandria =

Greek Patriarch of Alexandria from 1997 to 2004

His Divine Beatitude Peter VII
- Pope and Patriarch of Alexandria and All Africa
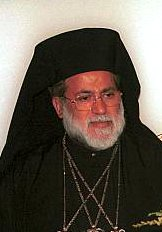
- Church: Greek Orthodox Church of Alexandria
- See: Alexandria
- Installed: 9 March 1997
- Term ended: 11 September 2004
- Predecessor: Parthenius III
- Successor: Theodore II

Orders
- Ordination: 1978
- Consecration: 1983

Personal details
- Born: Petros Papapetrou; 3 September 1949 Sichari, Kyrenia District, Cyprus
- Died: 11 September 2004 (aged 55) Northern Aegean Sea near Mount Athos, Greece

Peter VII (September 3, 1949 – September 11, 2004) was the Greek Orthodox Pope and Patriarch of Alexandria and all Africa from 1997 to 2004. During his reign, Petros VII was credited with reviving the Greek Orthodox churches in Africa by increasing the churches' attendance of about 250,000 people.

== Early life ==
Petros was born Petros Papapetrou (Greek: Πέτρος Παπαπέτρου) in Sichari, Kyrenia District, Cyprus on September 3, 1949. He was the oldest son of a Greek Orthodox family and both his father and grandfather were priests.

== Education ==
At the age of 12, Petros enrolled at the Machairas Monastery. Then at 17, Petros entered the Apostle Barnabas Seminary in Nicosia. He graduated from Barnbas Seminary in 1969 and was ordained as a deacon at the Machairas Monastery.

A year later, Petros was summoned by Patriarch Nicholas VI to Alexandria. He served as a deacon under Nicholas VI while studying at the Averof High Schools. Later on, in 1974, Petros received a scholarship from the Greek Foreign Ministry to attend the School of Theology at Athens University.

== Career ==
=== Work in Africa ===
Upon graduating from Athens University in 1978, Petros was ordained as a priest by Bishop Chrysostomos of Dodonis and left for Cairo, where he was given the title of Patriarchal Vicar. Later, in 1983, Petros was promoted to Bishop of Babylon. Throughout his career, Petros took on multiple posts throughout Africa, ranging from Johannesburg, Accra, Cameroon and Central East Africa. While in Africa, Petros focused on restoring monasteries, such as the Monastery of St. Sawas in Alexandria, and extending his missionary work in East Africa. He was consecrated Bishop of Babylon in 1983 and was subsequently appointed Patriarchal Vicar to Alexandria.

=== Patriarchate of Alexandria ===
Petros assumed the title of Patriarchate of Alexandria on March 9, 1997, following his election by the Holy Synod in February 1997. He had a close rapport with his predecessor, Parthenius III of Alexandria and assumed the latter's post after his death in 1996. Throughout his reign, Petros built relationships with other church organizations and engaged with religious churches outside the Greek Orthodox community. Petros also initiated peaceful relationships between the Muslim and Christian people in the Middle East and interacted with Arab leaders, including Yasser Arafat. Petros reigned as Patriarch of Alexandria for seven years until his death.

=== Missionary work ===
Petros used his position as patriarch to connect Orthodox groups throughout the world and to "spread the voice of Orthodoxy throughout Africa, to people who have never heard of Christ, who are dying from hunger and sicknesses, where there are no schools". In 2002, Petros wrote to George W. Bush in an attempt to prevent the Iraq War. In his letter, Petros stated that invading Iraq would be viewed as an attack on Islam and create future problems on other religions.

== Death ==
On September 11, 2004, Petros VII died in a 17-person helicopter crash alongside three other Church of Alexandria bishops. The Boeing Chinook helicopter carrying the passengers crashed into the Aegean Sea while travelling to the monasteries of Mount Athos. The government declared 3 days of national mourning. In 2007, Boeing was sued by the victims' families for negligence and product liability. The lawsuit was settled out of court.

He was awarded Order of the Yugoslav Crown and Order of Saint Sava.

Eastern Orthodox Church titles
Preceded by Parthenius III	Greek Patriarch of Alexandria; 1996–2004	Succeeded by Theodore II
