= Sung Jae-gi =

South Korean activist (1967–2013)

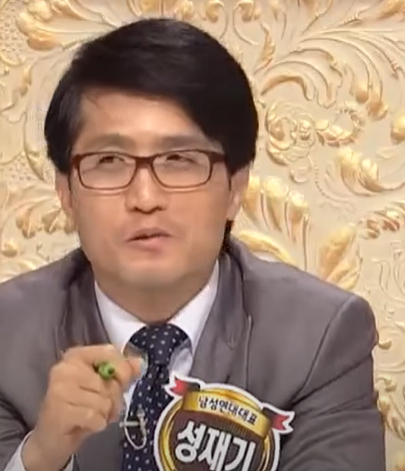
- Sung in 2013
- Born: September 11, 1967; Daegu, South Korea
- Died: July 26, 2013 (aged 45); Seoul, South Korea
- Cause of death: Suicide by drowning
- Other names: Shimheon, Chongjuk, Blue Wolf (pen name)
- Education: Yeungnam University
- Occupation: Writer
- Children: Two daughters

Korean name
- Hangul: 성재기
- Hanja: 成在基
- RR: Seong Jaegi
- MR: Sŏng Chaegi

Sung Jae-gi (Korean: 성재기; [səːŋ dʑɛgi]; September 11, 1967 – July 26, 2013) was a South Korean men's rights activist. Sung was the leader of various masculinist and anti-feminist organizations, including the Association of Anti-Feminism and Male Liberation, Association for the Abolition of the Ministry of Women, and Man of Korea. Sung also ran a shelter for homeless men, male victims of violent crime, teenage runaways, and gay and transgender men.

Near the end of his life Sung was reportedly up to ₩100 million in debt. On July 25, 2013, he posted on the Man of Korea website his intention to die by suicide. The next day, Sung jumped from the Mapo Bridge in Seoul. His body was found four days later.

== Career ==
He spent his early twenties as an insurance salesman, briefly managing his own business. In 2006, he operated a night club in Daegu.

During the early 2000s, Sung joined the South Korean men's rights movement and campaigned for a variety of causes. Sung argued that "The Ministry of Women in Korea is the largest in the world. It has 11 affiliated organizations, and 485 women's civic groups receive government support. However, there's only one men's organization, the Man of Korea." In 2006, he founded the Association of Anti-Feminism for the Liberation of Men (반페미니즘남성해방연대), and in 2007 he founded the Association for the Abolition of the Ministry of Women (여성부폐지운동본부). In 2013, both groups had several thousand members.

Sung founded masculinist organization Man of Korea to address his concerns that men are socially vulnerable and need a platform to voice their opinions.

=== Positions ===
In 1999, Sung opposed abolishing the South Korean military's bonus-points system (군 가산점; 軍 加算點) and military veterans' compensation. In October 2001 the system was found unconstitutional and repealed, with Sung advocating its reconstruction.

On October 3, 2012, he controversially posted on his Twitter account: "You [Korean women] should be ashamed of yourselves. Why are you making such a fuss about menstruating when the nation's birthrate is the lowest in the world?"

Sung opposed restrictions on access to internet pornography until his death, arguing that it reduced the number of sex crimes.

Sung ran a shelter and job placement agency for homeless or unemployed men, including young male runaways, gay, and transgender men.

During the early 2010s, he was an activist for the abolition of women-only facilities.

== Suicide ==
=== Preparation ===
In early July 2013, Sung's wife briefly left him. On July 25, he declared himself a victim of reverse discrimination and announced his intention to die by suicide. Sung jumped from the Mapo Bridge into the Han River, leaving a note saying that he would risk his life to raise ₩100 million (about $94,000) in donations to pay debts owed by Man of Korea.

He posted on the organization's website, "Dear citizens, I plan to jump off a bridge over the Han River. I hope you give us a last chance. Please lend us 100 million won which will be used for paying back debt and seed money of our organization". Sung's announcement was met with indifference. "Ridiculous. He is begging for money and he's holding himself as a hostage", read a post on the Man of Korea homepage. Another read, "Threat fund-raiser? That's creative. Just jump off the bridge like you promised".

Sung later said that he did not intend to die by suicide, but wanted to draw attention to his group; he would jump, whether or not he received the money. He posted on Twitter, "Why do you all assume that jumping off the bridge will kill me? I have complete confidence in my survival", and later said: "Please regard my actions as 'trying to be less pathetic' while asking for money". Some Man of Korea members and other supporters were concerned about the jump.

=== Jump ===
On July 26, 2013, Sung took a taxi from Yeongdeungpo to Mapo District with Han Seung-oh, Lee Ji-hun and five other people. Although he was accompanied by two lifeguards, it had rained heavily that day and the day before. At 3:00 pm, Sung jumped from the Mapo Bridge.

Rescue efforts began at about 3:20 pm, and a broad search of the Han River was conducted. Although about 30 firefighters and a helicopter searched near the Mapo Bridge, he was not found by 9 pm Friday and the search was suspended for the night. About 50 firefighters from the Yeongdeungpo Fire Station, one helicopter and three rescue boats continued the search Saturday and Sunday; six ambulances stood by.

Sung's body was found near the south end of the Seogang Bridge, connecting Yeouido to northern Seoul, on July 29. He was barefoot, and his white shirt and dark-gray pants were what he was wearing when he jumped. On August 1, Sung was cremated and his ashes buried in a crypt in the Gyongsan Park Cemetery (경산 공원 묘원) in Namchon (남천면), Gyeongsan, North Gyeongsang. There was a reported month-long increase in copycat suicides in August 2013.

== See also ==
- Idaenam
- Politics of South Korea
- Na Hye-sok
- Heo Jung-suk
- Han Chi-hwan

Preceded by founding	first Haeder of Korean male Association; November 26, 2006 – July 26, 2013	Succeeded by Han Seoug-oh
