= Patriarch Theodore II of Alexandria =

Greek Patriarch of Alexandria since 2004

His Divine Beatitude Theodore II
- Pope and Patriarch of Alexandria and All Africa
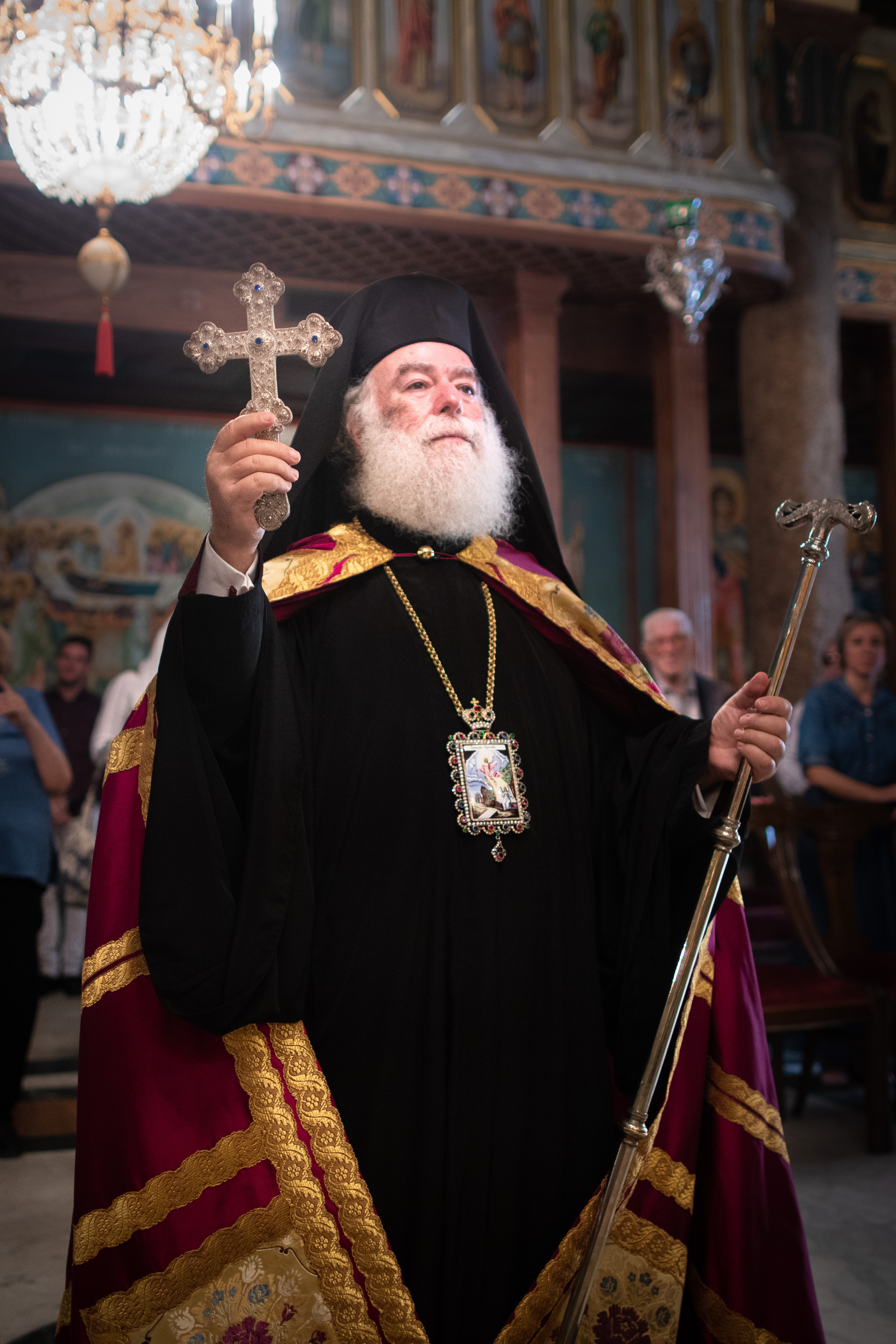
- Theodore II in 2019
- Native name: Θεόδωρος Β΄
- Church: Greek Orthodox Church of Alexandria
- See: Alexandria
- Elected: October 9, 2004
- Installed: October 24, 2004
- Predecessor: Peter VII

Orders
- Ordination: 1975
- Consecration: April 23, 1978

Personal details
- Born: Nikolaos Choreftakis; November 25, 1954 (age 71) Chania Prefecture, Crete, Kingdom of Greece
- Denomination: Eastern Orthodox Church
- Education: Rizarios Ecclesiastical School

Theodore II (Note: Greek: Θεόδωρος Β΄, romanized: Theodoros II) (born Nikolaos Choreftakis, (Note: Greek: Νικόλαος Χορευτάκης) November 25, 1954) is the Eastern Orthodox Patriarch of Alexandria and all Africa. He was previously a monk in the Agarathos Holy Monastery of the Assumption of the Virgin Mary.

== Early life and education ==
Nikolaos Choreftakis was born on the Greek island of Crete in 1954, where he completed his schooling. He is a graduate of the Rizarios Ecclesiastical School in Athens and holds a degree from the Theology Department of the Aristotle University of Thessaloniki. He also studied History of Art, Literature and Philosophy in Odesa.

He was ordained as Deacon in 1975 and Archbishop on 23 April 1978 by Metropolitan of Lambis and Sfakion Theodore Tzedakis. From 1975 to 1985, he served as Archdeacon and Chancellor of the Holy Metropolis of Lambis and Sfakion in Crete, where he developed significant Preaching and Philanthropic activities (hostels for needy youth, etc.). From 1985 to 1990 he served as Patriarchal Exarch in Russia, based in the Ukrainian city of Odesa, during the tenure of Patriarchs Nicholas VI and Parthenios III.

== Years of ministry ==
Theodore established the Institution of Hellenic Culture and the Philiki Eterea Museum with 600 children, where they were taught a thorough knowledge of Greek. In 1990, he was ordained Bishop of Kyrene and was appointed Representative of Patriarch Parthenios in Athens (1990–97). He always accompanied Patriarch Parthenios on his travels throughout Africa and to many international, interfaith and theological conferences.

In 1997, he was appointed Patriarchal Vicar of Alexandria by Patriarch Petros VII to assist him at the outset of his Patriarchate and after ten months he was elected as Metropolitan of Cameroon. He greatly developed missionary activity there. He built churches, schools and hospitals, helping many Africans and local Greeks. In 2002, he was transferred to the Holy Metropolis of Zimbabwe, where he established four missionary centres in Harare, a Hellenic Cultural Centre for 400 delegates, two large missionary centres in Malawi, with a hospital, technical schools and nursery schools. Aided by the Greek Parliament he renovated the Hellenic Square (School-Church-Vicarage) in Beira, Mozambique. He founded churches and contributed to the establishment of the Hellenic Communities of Botswana and Angola.

== Patriarch of Alexandria ==
Following the sudden death of late Patriarch Petros in a helicopter crash, Theodore was unanimously elected on October 9, 2004 by the Synod of the Alexandrian Throne as Patriarch. The enthronement ceremony took place at the Cathedral of Annunciation in Alexandria, on Sunday, October 24, 2004, in the presence of distinguished religious and civilian representatives and a great number of faithful. He is the seventh of Patriarch of Alexandria of Cretan origin after Silvester, Meletius Pigas, Cyrillos Lucaris, Gerasimus Palladas, Gerasimus Spartaliotis and Meletius Metaxakis.

On 8 November 2019, Patriarch Theodore II formally recognised the autocephaly granted by the Ecumenical Patriarchate of Constantinople to the Orthodox Church of Ukraine earlier that year. In response, the Moscow Patriarchate (the ROC) severed eucharistic communion with Patriarch Theodore and the like-minded bishops of his church, a decision that was confirmed by the Standing Holy Synod of the ROC on 26 December 2019.

== Awards ==
- Order of the Holy Equal-to-the-Apostles Grand Prince Vladimir I degree (ROC, 2007)
- Order of Glory and Honor I degree (ROC, 2013)
- Order of the UOC-MP of the Monks Anthony and Theodosius of the Kyiv-Pechersk I degree (2007)
- The Golden Order of St. George (Georgian Orthodox Church, 2008)
- The Patriarch Alexy II Prize "For outstanding activities to strengthen the unity of Orthodox peoples. For the approval and promotion of Christian values in the life of society" (2012)
- Order of the Serbian flag of the I degree (September 26, 2017, Serbia)
- Medal of the Holy Apostle and Evangelist John the Theologian, 1st Degree (December 6, 2017, St. Petersburg Theological Academy)

== Notes ==
Eastern Orthodox Church titles
| Preceded by Peter VII | Greek Patriarch of Alexandria; October 24, 2004 – present | Incumbent |
