= Man of Korea =

South Korean masculist organization

- Hangul: 남성연대
- Hanja: 男性連帶
- Revised Romanization: Namseongyeondae
- McCune–Reischauer: Namsŏngyŏndae

Man of Korea (Korean: 남성연대; literally Solidarity for Men) is a non-profit masculist organization in South Korea. It was founded in 2008, and first leader was Sung Jae-gi.

== History ==
Man of Korea has insisted on the abolition of the Ministry of Gender Equality and Family, otherwise translated as Ministry of Women's Family(여성가족부), by reason of pro-woman on their own terms, and the revival of the Extra Point System for Veterans who served in the military in South Korea. The group has been under financial distress with more than 200 million won debts because it did not get government support.

=== White Stockings Campaign ===
Sung mocked the White Tie Campaign organized by the Ministry of Gender Equality and Family, saying that the campaign supported prostitution. In 2011, Man of Korea launched a "White Stockings Campaign" in an email to members. The email claimed that the campaign was supported by the ministry, but the campaign lampooned the ministry's support program for former prostitutes. Man of Korea claimed that under the ministry plan, former prostitutes would receive job training at support centers and the ministry would give them ₩410,000 per month and legal and medical services for up to three years.

Sung also argued against viewing prostitutes as victims. He stated "We wanted to show that the ministry’s support program for former prostitutes is not effective. The ministry spends about 11-12 billion won per year on the program. But such support is given to any women who claim they were prostitutes, and the ministry is unable to verify whether they were really engaged in the sex trade or not". His view that prostitutes were not victims contrasted with that of South Korean feminists, and he opposed treating female prostitution as a crime.

== See also ==
- Angry young man (South Korea)

== Sources ==
- Kim Yong-suk: The Ddanji December, 2012. The ddanji group, 2012, EAN 4808989299141
