= Parthenius III of Alexandria =

Greek Patriarch of Alexandria from 1986 to 1996

Parthenius III (Greek: Παρθένιος Γ΄; 30 November 1919 – 23 July 1996) served as the Greek Orthodox Patriarch of Alexandria between 1986 and 1996.

He was distinguished for his theological knowledge and his manifold activity in the ecumenical movement and the Theological Dialogues.

He worked tirelessly for the spread of Orthodox Missions, especially in Uganda, where he established the Metropolis of Kampala, and in Kenya.

Patriarch Parthenius III died 23 July 1996 of a heart attack, during his vacations in the Greek islands. The government declared three days of national mourning.

Preceded by Nicholas VI	Greek Orthodox Patriarch of Alexandria; 1986–1996	Succeeded by Peter VII
