= Idaenam =

Term for anti-feminist young men in South Korea

Idaenam (Korean: 이대남; Hanja: 二代男), abbreviated from isipdae namseong (20대 남성; 二十代男性; lit. 'man in his twenties'), is a term used in South Korea to refer to men in their 20s. The term first emerged in the late 2010s to refer to men who have voting rights but recently it is often used to refer to men with negative tendencies toward feminism. Its political and social antonym is idaenyeo (이대녀; 二代女), abbreviated from Isipdae yeoseong (20대 여성; 二十代女性; lit. 'woman in her twenties').

== Background ==
At the end of 2018, the term idaenam began to emerge after a poll rating the Moon Jae-In administration's first-year plunged. In particular, media began to pay attention to the large gender gap in a poll of 20s. Moon Jae In's approval rating among Korean men in their 20s fell below 30%. The figure is the lowest among all age groups, including the elderly with strong conservative tendencies. On the other hand, the approval rating of President Moon among women in their 20s was 63.5%, the highest among men and women by age group.

In researcher Han Gui Young's analysis examining the phenomenon of idaenam, men in their 20s were the most conservative in subjective ideological orientation and evaluation of presidential performance. The use of the word idaenam exploded as the proportion of Oh Se-hoon's votes among men in their 20s exceeded 70% during the Seoul mayoral election of the 2021 by-elections.

== Views ==
Idaenam have a negative tendency toward feminism. They have been compared to "Angry Young Men" in Susan Faludi's 1991 book Backlash. Idaenam are strongly opposed to misandry ('남성혐오' or '남혐').

In 2021, a survey by National Human Rights Commission of Korea found that 70 percent of men in their twenties opposed affirmative action for women. Many idaenam believe that the gender quotas are discriminatory. In addition, according to statistics from 2021, men in their twenties and thirties were less receptive to LGBT rights than men in their 40s and 50s ("386 Generation male"), but more than men above the age of sixty.

== In South Korean politics ==
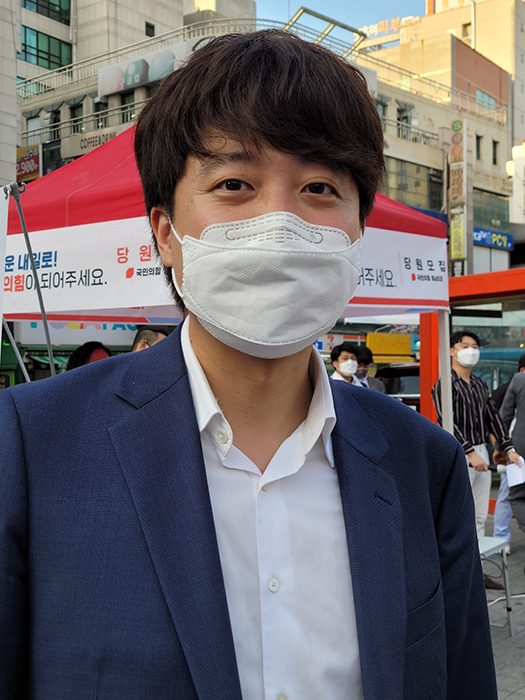
Lee Jun-seok is one of the most representative idaenam politicians of South Korea.

The idaenam phenomenon often leads to political conservatism or populism (Including both left and right sides). The JoongAng, a South Korean centre-right publication, reported that Lee Jun-seok, the then leader of the People Power Party, used anti-feminist investigations to win the votes of idaenam.

South Korea's liberal Moon Jae-in government implemented a more feminist policy than the previous conservative government, and men in their 20s had severe antipathy against it. Yoon Suk-yeol of right-wing conservative People Power Party and Lee Jae-myung of liberal Democratic Party of Korea, who were the main candidates for the 2022 South Korean presidential election, took a negative attitude toward feminism to win the votes of idaenam.

Centrist conservative-liberal People Party's Ahn Cheol Soo criticized Yoon and Lee for promoting misogyny to pander to sexist idaenam.

In 2024, during the martial law crisis, the protests against Yoon invoking martial law were marked by a lack of turnout from young men. Yoon was then impeached, and during the next presidential election held in 2025, the gender/age divisions persisted, as also Lee Jun-seok ran as a third-party, Reform Party candidate, and received a plurality (37.2%) of the votes of men aged 18–29, beating out People Power Party candidate Kim Moon-soo by a mere 0.3%. The support for Lee Jae-myung, who ran again and this time won the election, was once again the lowest amongst men aged 18–29, at just 24%; while people in their 40s and 50s, regardless of gender, again backed Lee Jae-Myung by about 70%.

== See also ==
- Finger-pinching conspiracy theory, a discredited conspiracy theory believed by South Korean men
- Feminism in South Korea
- Ilbe Storehouse, internet forum
- Sung Jae-gi, South Korean men's rights activist

General:

- Antifeminism
- Reverse discrimination
- Backlash (sociology)
- Identity politics
- Incel
- Manosphere
- Politics of resentment
- Angry young man (disambiguation)
- Hyōgen no jiyū senshi
