= Patriarch Nicholas VI of Alexandria =

Greek Patriarch of Alexandria from 1968 to 1986

Nicholas VI (February 1913 – 10 July 1986) served as Greek Orthodox Patriarch of Alexandria between 1968 and 1986.

| Preceded by Christopher II | Greek Orthodox Patriarch of Alexandria; 1968–1986 | Succeeded by Parthenius III |
