= List of bishops of the Polish National Catholic Church =

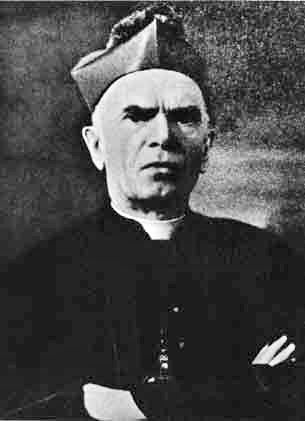
Francisk Hodur - first Bishop and founder Polish National Catholic Church

This is a list of bishops of the Polish National Catholic Church (PNCC), with links to the bishops who consecrated them. Despite its name, the Polish National Catholic Church is located in the US. The PNCC is not in communion with the Catholic Church. The PNCC was founded in 1897 in Pennsylvania, by Franciszek Hodur who was also the PNCC's first bishop.

The number references the sequence of consecration. "Diocese" refers to the diocese over which the bishop presided or, if he did not preside, the diocese in which he served as coadjutor bishop or auxiliary bishop. The ordinal before the diocese name represents where in the sequence that bishop falls; e.g., the fourth bishop of the Central Diocese is written "4th Central". Where a diocese is in bold type, it indicates that the bishop is the current bishop of that diocese. The consecrator listed first represents the principal consecrator.

== Chart of episcopal succession ==
- (*) Prime Bishop
- (‡) Current Diocesan bishop
- (&) Current Coadjutor bishop
- Current Auxiliary bishop

| No. | Name of bishop | Consecrators | Date of consecration | Installation as bishop | End of tenure | Diocese |
|---|---|---|---|---|---|---|
| 1 | Franciszek Hodur^{*} | Gerardus Gul | September 29, 1907 | 1904 | 1953 | 1st Prime Bishop |
| 1 | Franciszek Hodur^{*} | Gerardus Gul | September 29, 1907 | 1907 | 1949 | 1st Central |
| 2 | Leon Grochowski^{*} | Francis Hodur | August 17, 1924 | 1953 | 1968 | 2nd Prime Bishop |
| 2 | Leon Grochowski^{*} | Francis Hodur | August 17, 1924 | November 1954 | July 17, 1969 | 3rd Central |
| 2 | Leon Grochowski^{*} | Francis Hodur | August 17, 1924 | 1926 | 1955 | 1st Western |
| 3 | Francis Bonczak | Francis Hodur | August 17, 1924 | August 17, 1924 | 1928 | 1st Polish |
| 4 | Valentine Gawrychowski | Francis Hodur | August 17, 1924 | 1925 | February 1, 1934 | 1st Eastern |
| 5 | John Gritenas | Francis Hodur | August 17, 1924 | August 17, 1924 | December 28, 1928 | 1st Bishop of the Lithuanian National Catholic Church |
| 6 | John Zenon Jasinski | Francis Hodur; Valentine Gawrychowski; Leon Grochowski | June 7, 1928 | June 7, 1928 | April 28, 1951 | 1st Buffalo-Pittsburgh |
| 7 | Władysław Faron | Francis Hodur; Leon Grochowski; John Zenon Jasinski | January 30, 1930 | 1929 | September 2, 1931 | 2nd Polish |
| 8 | John Misiaszek | Franciszek Hodur; Leon Grochowski; John Zenon Jasinski | August 26, 1936 | 1949 | November 1954 | 2nd Central |
| 9 | Józef Padewski | Francis Hodur | August 26, 1936 | August 26, 1936 | May 10, 1951 | 3rd Polish |
| 10 | Joseph Lesniak | Franciszek Hodur; Leon Grochowski; John Zenon Jasinski; John Misiaszek | November 16, 1937 | November 16, 1937 | September 1953 | 2nd Eastern |
| 10 | Joseph Lesniak | Franciszek Hodur; Leon Grochowski; John Zenon Jasinski; John Misiaszek | November 16, 1937 | June 3, 1951 | September 1953 | 2nd Buffalo-Pittsburgh |
| 11 | Joseph Soltysiak | Leon Grochowski; Francis Bonczak; Joseph Lesniak; John Misiaszek; G. Ashton Oldham (Episcopal Diocese of Albany) | April 23, 1952 | 1951 | July 9, 1973 | 3rd Eastern |
| 12 | Thaddeus F. Zielinski^{*} | Leon Grochowski; Joseph Lesniak; Joseph Soltysiak; John Misiaszek | September 2, 1954 | September 2, 1954 | 1969 | 3rd Buffalo-Pittsburgh |
| 12 | Thaddeus F. Zielinski^{*} | Leon Grochowski; Joseph Lesniak; Joseph Soltysiak; John Misiaszek | September 2, 1954 | 1969 | 1978 | 3rd Prime Bishop |
| 13 | Joseph Kardas | Leon Grochowski | September 2, 1954 | 1955 | July 8, 1958 | 2nd Western |
| 14 | Francis Carl Rowinski^{*} | Leon Grochowski | May 9, 1959 | 1959 | 1978 | 3rd Western |
| 14 | Francis Carl Rowinski^{*} | Leon Grochowski | May 9, 1959 | October 3, 1978 | 1990 | 5th Buffalo-Pittsburgh |
| 14 | Francis Carl Rowinski^{*} | Leon Grochowski | May 9, 1959 | October 3, 1978 | 1985 | 4th Prime Bishop |
| 15 | Eugene Magyar | Leon Grochowski | June 29, 1963 | June 29, 1963 | October 19, 1968 | 1st Bishop of the Slovak National Catholic Church |
| 16 | Joseph Nieminski | Leon Grochowski; Thaddeus F. Zielinski; Joseph Soltysiak | June 26, 1968 | June 26, 1968 | September 20, 1992 | 1st Canadian |
| 17 | Walter Slowakiewicz | Leon Grochowski | June 26, 1968 | 1972 | October 19, 1978 | 4th Eastern |
| 18 | Anthony Rysz | Leon Grochowski; Thaddeus F. Zielinski; Francis Carl Rowinski | June 26, 1968 | June 26, 1968 | July 1969 | Coadjutor Central |
| 18 | Anthony Rysz | Leon Grochowski; Thaddeus F. Zielinski; Francis Carl Rowinski | June 26, 1968 | October 18, 1970 | 1999 | 4th Central |
| 19 | Daniel Cyganowski | Thaddeus Zielinski | November 30, 1971 | November 30, 1971 | 1977 | 4th Buffalo-Pittsburgh |
| 20 | Thomas Gnat | Francis Carl Rowinski; Anthony Rysz; Joseph Nieminski | November 30, 1978 | 1978 | 2011 | 5th Eastern |
| 21 | Joseph Zawistowski | Francis Carl Rowinski | November 30, 1978 | 1978 | April 19, 1994 | 4th Western |
| 22 | John Swantek^{*} | Francis Carl Rowinski; Thaddeus F. Zielinski; Anthony Rysz; Joseph Nieminski | November 30, 1978 | 1985 | 2002 | 5th Prime Bishop |
| 23 | Thaddeus Peplowski | Leon Grochowski; Thaddeus F. Zielinski; Joseph Soltysiak | November 30, 1990 | 1990 | 2012 | 6th Buffalo-Pittsburgh |
| 24 | Robert M. Nemkovich^{*} | John Swantek; Thomas Gnat | October 18, 1993 | 1994 | 2003 | 5th Western |
| 24 | Robert M. Nemkovich^{*} | John Swantek; Thomas Gnat | October 18, 1993 | October 8, 2002 | 2010 | 6th Prime Bishop |
| 24 | Robert M. Nemkovich^{*} | John Swantek; Thomas Gnat | October 18, 1993 | December 9, 2005 | November 30, 2006 | 6th Central |
| 25 | Joseph Tomczyk | John Swantek; Thomas Gnat | October 18, 1993 | October 18, 1993 | October 4, 1995 | 2nd Canadian |
| 26 | Casimir Grotnik | John Swantek; Thomas Gnat; Robert Nemkovich; Antonius Jan Glazemaker; Hans Gerny; Wiktor Wysoczański | November 30, 1999 | November 30, 1999 | December 2005 | 5th Central |
| 27 | Jan Dawidziuk | John Swantek; Thomas Gnat; Robert M. Nemkovich | November 30, 1999 | 2003 | June 5, 2009 | 6th Western |
| 28 | Sylvester Bigaj | Robert M. Nemkovich; Thomas Gnat; Thaddeus Peplowski; Jan Dawidziuk; John Swantek; Anthony Rysz | November 30, 2006 | May 26, 2007 | January 7, 2013 | 3rd Canadian |
| 29 | Anthony Kopka | Robert M. Nemkovich; Thomas Gnat; Thaddeus Peplowski; Jan Dawidziuk; John Swantek; Anthony Rysz | November 30, 2006 | July 1, 2009 | 2011 | 7th Western |
| 30 | John E. Mack^{‡} | Robert Nemkovich; Thomas Gnat; Thaddeus Peplowski; Jan Dawidziuk; John Swantek; Anthony Rysz | November 30, 2006 | February 1, 2011 | August 14, 2012 | 8th Central |
| 30 | John E. Mack^{‡} | Robert Nemkovich; Thomas Gnat; Thaddeus Peplowski; Jan Dawidziuk; John Swantek; Anthony Rysz | November 30, 2006 | August 15, 2012 | present | **7th Buffalo-Pittsburgh** |
| 31 | Anthony Mikovsky^{*} | Robert M. Nemkovich; Thomas Gnat; Thaddeus Peplowski; Jan Dawidziuk; John Swantek; Anthony Rysz | November 30, 2006 | November 30, 2006 | January 31, 2011 | 7th Central |
| 31 | Anthony Mikovsky^{*} | Robert M. Nemkovich; Thomas Gnat; Thaddeus Peplowski; Jan Dawidziuk; John Swantek; Anthony Rysz | November 30, 2006 | 2010 | present | **7th Prime Bishop** |
| 32 | Paul Sobiechowski^{‡} | Anthony Mikovsky; Sylvester Bigaj; Thomas Gnat; Anthony Kopka; John E. Mack; Thaddeus Peplowski | October 18, 2011 | December 2011 | present | **6th Eastern** |
| 33 | Stanley Bilinski | Anthony Mikovsky | September 14, 2012 | 2012 | November 2, 2018 | 8th Western |
| 34 | Bernard Nowicki^{‡} | Anthony Mikovsky | September 14, 2012 | September 14, 2012 | present | **9th Central** |
| 35 | Jarosław Rafałko | Anthony Mikovsky; John E. Mack; Paul Sobiechowski; Bernard Nowicki; John Swantek | September 14, 2020 | October 3, 2020 | July 13, 2023 | 9th Western |

== See also ==
- Polish National Catholic Church
- Central Diocese of the Polish National Catholic Church
- St. John's Cathedral (Toronto)
- Union of Scranton
