= Thomas Gnat =

American prelate

The Right Reverend Thomas J. Gnat
- Bishop of the PNCC
- Diocese: Eastern Diocese of the Polish National Catholic Church
- Elected: November 30, 1978
- Term ended: 2011
- Predecessor: Walter Slowakiewicz
- Successor: Paul Sobiechowski

Orders
- Ordination: September 18, 1958 by Leon Grochowski of the Polish National Catholic Church
- Consecration: November 30, 1978 by Francis Carl Rowinski, Anthony Rysz, and Joseph Nieminski of the Polish National Catholic Church

Personal details
- Born: December 2, 1936
- Died: June 21, 2017 (aged 80)
- Buried: Saint Stanislaus Cathedral PNCC Cemetery in Scranton, PA

Thomas J. Gnat (December 2, 1936 - June 21, 2017) was a bishop of the Eastern Diocese of Polish National Catholic Church. He was born in Milwaukee, Wisconsin and attended Savonarola Theological Seminary in Scranton, Pennsylvania. Gnat was ordained a priest on September 18, 1958 by Bishop Leon Grochowski in the historic cathedral of St. Saint Stanislaus in Scranton, PA, and from 1958 to 1959 he was a pastor in Scranton. From 1959, he was the parish priest of the Holy Trinity Parish in Washington, PA, where, in addition to his clerical duties, he represented the Polish National Catholic Church in contacts with state administration offices. In 1970, he was appointed as Administrative Senior for a deanery within the Polish National Catholic Church.

Gnat was elected bishop by the 15th Synod of the Polish National Church, and he was consecrated on November 30, 1978 in the cathedral of St. Saint Stanislaus in Scranton. He received episcopal consecration from the hands of Prime Bishop Francis Rowinski, with the participation of retired Prime Bishop Thaddeus Zielinski and bishops Anthony Rysz and Joseph Nieminski. After his episcopal ordination, he was the Bishop Ordinary of the Eastern Diocese of the Polish National Catholic Church from 1978 to his retirement in 2011. He died on June 21, 2017 in Scranton, and was buried on June 27, 2017 at Saint Stanislaus Cathedral PNCC Cemetery in Scranton, PA.

From 1964 he was married to Katarzyna Stańkowicz, with whom he had a son, Joseph Walenty Gnat.
