= John Mack =

John Mack may refer to:

- John Martin Mack (1715–1784), Moravian bishop
- John Mack (Serampore) (1797–1845), Baptist missionary in India
- John Mack (Medal of Honor recipient) (1843–1881), American Civil War sailor and Medal of Honor recipient
- John J. Mack (coach) (1870–1923), Yale University track coach
- John Sephus Mack (1880–1940), president of the G. C. Murphy Company
- John Mack (British politician) (1899–1957), Labour Member of Parliament for Newcastle-under-Lyme 1942–1951
- John Mack (musician) (1927–2006), American oboist
- John E. Mack (1929–2004), American psychiatrist known for his interest in alien abduction
- John Givan Davis Mack (1867–1924), American engineer
- John Mack (civic leader) (1937–2018), president of the Los Angeles Urban League
- John J. Mack (born 1944), former CEO and chairman of the board of Morgan Stanley
- John C. Mack (born 1976), American photographer
- John L. Mack (fl. 1956–1993), American sound engineer
- John E. Mack (bishop), bishop of the Polish National Catholic Church
- John M. (Jack) Mack, one of the founding brothers of Mack Trucks
- John Mack (anthropologist) (born 1949), British social anthropologist and art historian
- John Mack (athletic director), director of athletics for Princeton University

== See also ==
- Jack Mack (1881–1960), Australian rules footballer
- Johnny Mac (disambiguation)
