= Joseph Lesniak =

- Bishop of the PNCC
- Diocese: Eastern Diocese of the Polish National Catholic Church
- Elected: November 16, 1937
- Term ended: September 1953
- Predecessor: Valentine Gawrychowski
- Successor: Joseph Soltysiak

Orders
- Consecration: November 16, 1937 by Francis Hodur, Leon Grochowski, John Zenon Jasinski, and John Misiaszek of the Polish National Catholic Church

Personal details
- Born: July 20, 1890
- Died: July 1979

Joseph Lesniak (July 20, 1890 - July, 1979) was a bishop of the Polish National Catholic Church. He was consecrated on November 16, 1937, by Franciszek Hodur with the assistance of Bishop Leon Grochowski, Bishop John Zenon Jasinski and John Misiaszek. He was elected the diocesan bishop for the Eastern Diocese in 1937, and served as bishop from 1937 to 1953. He then was appointed the diocesan bishop for the Buffalo-Pittsburgh Diocese from 1951 to 1953. He retired in September 1953.
