= Joseph Soltysiak =

(Leo) Joseph Sołtysiak (September 29, 1895 in Poland - July 9, 1973) was a Polish-born bishop of the Eastern Diocese of the Polish National Catholic Church, based in Manchester, New Hampshire, United States. After studies at Savonarola Theological Seminary, he was ordained to the priesthood in June 1917. He was consecrated on April 23, 1952, in Scranton, Pennsylvania, by Leon Grochowski, Francis Bonczak, Joseph Lesniak and John Misiaszek, in addition to G. Ashton Oldham of the Episcopal Diocese of Albany.
