= St. Stanislaus Cathedral (Scranton, Pennsylvania) =

- St. Stanislaus Cathedral Polish Catholic Church
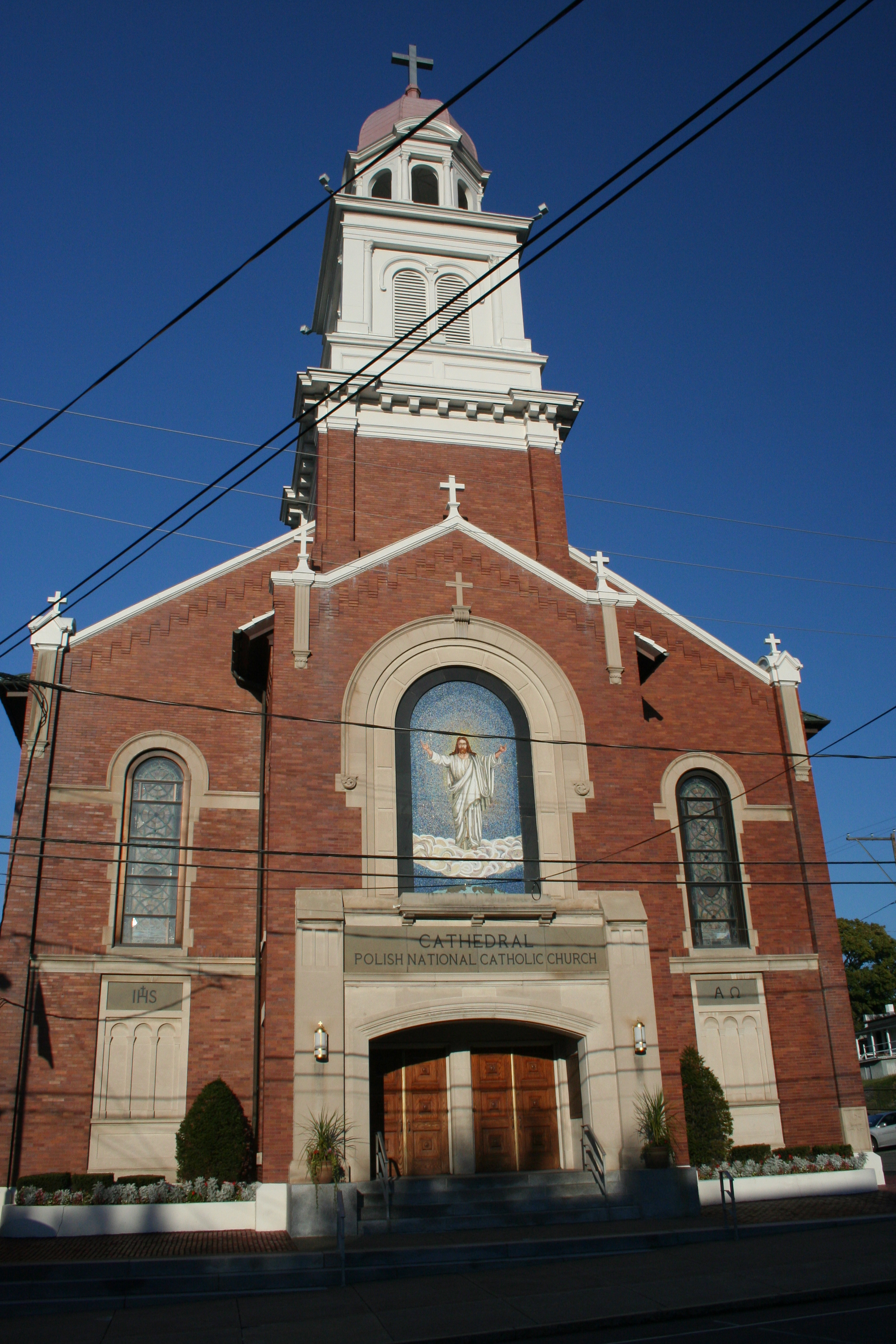
- St. Stanislaus Cathedral
- 41°23′37.5″N 75°40′10.1″W
- Location: 529 E Locust St, Scranton, Pennsylvania
- Country: United States
- Denomination: Polish National Catholic Church
- Website: http://saintstanislauspncc.org/

History
- Founded: 1895
- Consecrated: 1897

Specifications
- Capacity: 600

Administration
- Diocese: Central Diocese (PNCC)

Clergy
- Bishop: Anthony Mikovsky

Saint Stanislaus Cathedral is the headquarters and one of the first churches built of the Polish National Catholic Church. It is named after Stanislaus of Szczepanów.

== History ==
=== Establishment ===
Establishment of the parish of St. Stanislaus occurred due to a dispute between the Roman Catholic priest and Polish parishioners at the Heart of Jesus and Mary Parish in Scranton over the parish finances and laity involvement. For many years the Polish Catholic in the area had been unsatisfied with the Catholic administration, who were mostly non-Poles. In 1895, an incident occurred when the parishioners would not let the priest say mass, resulting in the priest expelling them and many Polish families leaving the parish and establishing their own church. Soon the new congregation broke with the Roman Catholic church and established their own denomination. On March 14, 1897, the parish assembly elected Franciszek Hodur, a Polish-American Catholic priest as its pastor. Hodur was consecrated as a bishop in 1907 in Utrecht, Netherlands, by three Old Catholic bishops. The Polish National Catholic Church considers him to be the founder and first bishop of their denomination. In 1898 Hodur and others who had been excommunicated burned their excommunication letters from Rome and tossed them in the river. In 1900 Hodur broke with tradition by chanting the Christmas Eve midnight mass in Polish rather than Latin.

=== Modern day ===
On November 21, 2010 Anthony Mikovsky was installed as prime bishop of the Polish National Catholic Church by bishop emeritus Robert M. Nemkovich. The Roman Catholic bishop of Scranton Joseph Bambera and bishop emeritus James Timlin also attended the event.

In December 2016 the church announced that St. Stanislaus Elementary School, which had been run by the cathedral for over 120 years, would close in June 2017, citing a steep decline in enrollment for the past 5 years.

== Building ==
The parish operates St. Stanislaus cemetery, where Michael Sevensky, a parishioner at the cathedral and member of Merrill's Marauders, is buried. The cathedral also operates Saint Stanislaus Youth Center in Scranton.

== Function ==
The Cathedral is today the seat of central diocese of the Polish National Catholic Church which goes from Albany, N.Y., to Washington, D.C. and serves around 25,000 members.
