= Eastern Diocese of the Polish National Catholic Church =

Polish National Catholic diocese in the US

Location
- Country: United States
- Territory: New Hampshire, Massachusetts, Connecticut, Rhode Island
- Episcopal conference: Union of Scranton
- Coordinates: 42°59′47.5″N 71°27′26.4″W

Statistics
- Parishes: 17
- Members: ~3000

Information
- First holder: Valentine Gawrychowski
- Rite: Roman Rite (Old Catholicism)
- Established: 1925
- Diocese: Eastern
- Cathedral: Holy Trinity Cathedral, Manchester, New Hampshire
- Secular priests: 14

Current leadership
- Bishop: Paul Sobiechowski

Website
- Eastern Diocese of the Polish National Catholic Church Official Website

The Eastern Diocese of the Polish National Catholic Church is one of the 5 dioceses of the Polish National Catholic Church in the United States and Canada, with its seat in Manchester, New Hampshire. Paul Sobiechowski is the current bishop ordinary of the Eastern Diocese, being consecrated in 2011. He succeeded Thomas Gnat, who was consecrated a bishop in 1978. The constitution and laws of the Polish National Catholic Church provide for the mandatory retirement of bishops at the age of 75.

== Parishes of the Eastern Diocese ==
Prime Bishop of the Polish National Catholic Church: The Most Rev. Anthony Mikovsky
Eastern Diocese of the Polish National Catholic Church (17 parishes)
Diocesan Cathedral: Holy Trinity Cathedral - Manchester, NH
Diocesan Bishop: Rt. Rev. Paul Sobiechowski

- Blessed Trinity Parish - Fall River, MA
- Saint Casimir's Parish - Lowell, MA
- Holy Cross Parish - Central Falls, RI
- Our Saviors Parish - Woonsocket, RI
- Holy Cross Parish - Ware, MA
- Holy Mother of the Rosary Parish - Chicopee, MA
- Holy Name Of Jesus Parish - South Deerfield, MA
- Holy Trinity Parish - Webster, MA
- Saint Joseph's Parish - Westfield, MA
- Saint Valentine's Parish - Northampton, MA
- Divine Providence Parish - Norwich, CT
- Holy Savior Parish - Union City, CT
- Holy Trinity Parish - Plantsville, CT
- Saint Casimir's Parish - Wallingford, CT
- Saint John the Baptist Parish - Manchester, CT
- Saint Joseph's Parish - Stratford, CT
