= John Jasinski =

John Jasinski may refer to:

- John Jasinski (academic administrator), president of Northwest Missouri State University
- John Jasinski (politician), member of the Minnesota Senate
- John Zenon Jasinski, bishop of the Polish National Catholic Church
