= Peplowski =

Peplowski is a surname that is primarily found in the United States. Notable people with the surname include:

- Anna Peplowski (born 2002), American competitive swimmer
- Ken Peplowski (1959–2026), American jazz clarinetist and tenor saxophonist
- Mike Peplowski (born 1970), American basketball player
- Thaddeus Peplowski (1936–2018), American bishop of the Polish National Catholic Church
- Werner Peplowski (born 1944), German former trade union leader

== See also ==
- Joe Peploski (1891–1972), American baseball player
- Anne Pellowski (1933–2023), Kashubian American educator, folklorist, and author
