= Order of Port Royal =

Old Catholic religious order

Coordinates: 47.873393°N 10.5738286°E

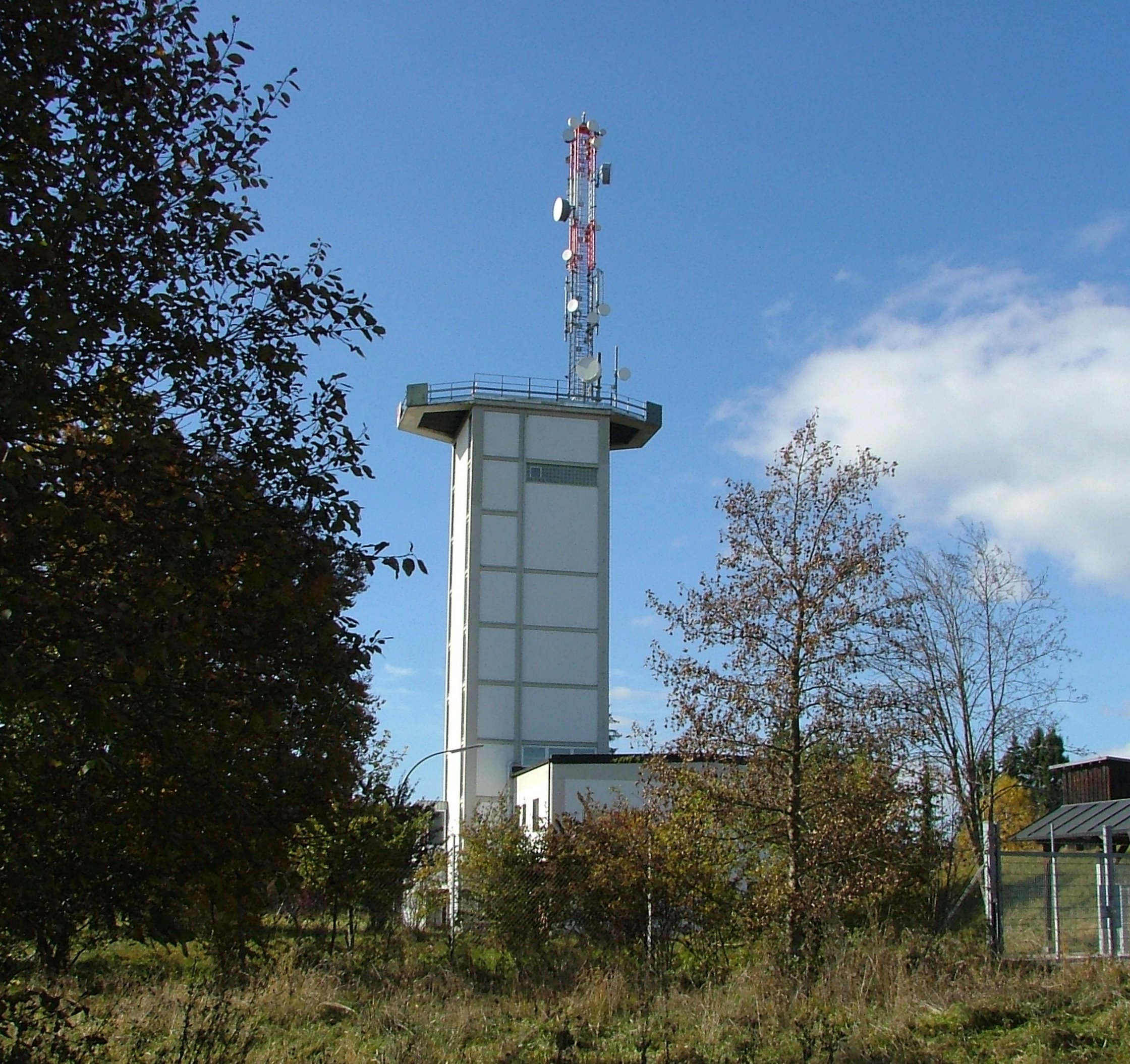
The radar station which has been converted into St. Severin's Abbey

The Order of Port Royal (German: Orden von Port Royal) is an Old Catholic religious order in the Cistercian tradition whose motherhouse is St. Severin's Abbey in Kaufbeuren, Germany. Professed monks use the post-nominal letters OPR. At Kaufbeuren there are four resident monks, one hermit, one nonresident sister, and several lay oblates. The order has no other abbeys, but has at various times claimed individual friars in Ebenweiler, Dresden and Korschenbroich in Germany; Port-au-Prince, Haiti; Brownwood, Texas; Kumbo, Cameroon; and Karlskrona, Sweden.

== Origins ==
The order was founded in Budapest in 1946 by Thomas Fehérváry (1917–1984), who had been ordained a priest (1939) and bishop (1945) by the Polish-based Mariavite Church and was head of the "Hungarian Christian Catholic Church". The order's name reflects Fehérváry's view of it as a revival of the French abbey of Port-Royal-des-Champs, which was suppressed in 1709 for Jansenism and some of whose supporters emigrated to the Old Catholic Archdiocese of Utrecht. Fehérváry originally established two abbeys of the order in Hungary. After the 1956 Hungarian uprising, the Hungarian People's Republic suppressed Fehérváry's church and he went underground, using the alias Julius Czernohorsky. In the 1950s Max Rademacher, a priest of the German diocese of the Union of Utrecht, founded St. Severin's as an enclosed abbey. Rademacher ordained others after 1962, when Fehérváry ordained him as bishop. In 1964 Fehérváry emigrated to Montreal where he founded the "Traditional Christian Catholic Church" for Hungarian Old Catholic émigrés. Also in 1964, St. Severin's disaffiliated from its diocese to become autocephalous. It went into decline after 1967, when Rademacher left for the Roman Catholic Church. In the 1990s Peter Falk, St. Severin's last priest, instigated a "renewal".

== History since 1990s ==
In consultation with local "religious seekers", Falk changed the abbey's mission from enclosed contemplation to public ministry; revived the designation "Order of Port Royal"; and had himself ordained as a bishop. The abbey relocated several times in the vicinity of Kaufbeuren, moving in 1999 from Buchloe to Neugablonz, in 2002 to Leinau in Pforzen, and in 2010 to a decommissioned Bundeswehr radar station overlooking Oberbeuren and Friesenried. Falk was succeeded as bishop-abbot by Klaus Schlapps, whose other interests included the revival of the 19th-century Abbey-Principality of San Luigi. The order rejoined the German Union of Utrecht diocese in 2004, removing references to Fehérváry from its publicity; its priests were conditionally (re-)ordained by the diocese. This allowed OPR members outside Europe to receive support from the local Anglican Communion bishop under the 1931 Bonn Agreement. The abbey left the diocese again in 2010, in part in opposition to diocese's ordination of women. Former OPR members in Dresden and Korschenbroich stayed with the diocese rather than St. Severin's; the Dresden member self-designated as a member of "Ordre de Port-Royal, Communitas Divini Salvatoris".

In 2011–2012, OPR and other former German Old Catholic priests founded the "Christian Catholic Church in Germany" (CKK; Christ-Katholische Kirche in Deutschland), whose name reflects its Hungarian progenitor but incurred protests from the Swiss Christian Catholic Church which is in the Union of Utrecht. In 2012 the CKK joined the Nordic Catholic Church, a church of high-church Lutheran origin which is in turn a member of the Union of Scranton.

In 2017–2018, the "Swedish Province of the Order of Port Royal" was established when Nordic Catholic Church priest Franciskus Urban Sylvan became prior (and sole monk) of the "Priory of St. Stephanus" in Karlskrona. St. Severin's Abbey was thenceforth in the "German Province" of the OPR. In 2018 the CKK left the Nordic Catholic Church and is no longer recognised by the Union of Scranton, although Union-affiliated bishops participated in a 2019 ordination of CKK bishops. In 2019, Franciskus Urban Sylvan was removed from office by the Nordic Catholic Church after being fired as a folk high school teacher for anti-LGBT rhetoric.
