= Joseph Nieminski =

The Right Reverend Joseph Nieminski
- Bishop of the PNCC
- Successor: Joseph Tomczyk

Orders
- Consecration: June 26, 1968 by Leon Grochowski of the Polish National Catholic Church

Personal details
- Born: May 22, 1926 Hazleton, Pennsylvania, US
- Died: September 20, 1992 (aged 66) Toronto, Ontario, Canada
- Education: Savonarola Theological Seminary

Joseph Ignatius Nieminski (May 22, 1926 - September 20, 1992) was the first bishop of the Toronto-based Canadian Diocese of Polish National Catholic Church. He was born in Hazleton, Pennsylvania and ordained to the priesthood in 1946 after studies at Savonarola Theological Seminary in Scranton. He was consecrated in 1968, and served on the Polish National Catholic Church's dialogue commission with the Roman Catholic Church. While in Toronto with oversight for Canadian PNCC parishes, he also organized a Croatian National Catholic Church. Nieminski died in Toronto.

Polish National Catholic Titles
| Preceded by Office Established | Bishop Ordinary of the Canadian Diocese of the Polish National Catholic Church; June 26, 1968 – September 20, 1992 | Succeeded by Joseph Tomczyk |
