= Zawistowski =

Zawistowski (feminine: Zawistowska; plural: Zawistowscy) is a Polish surname. Notable people with the surname include:

- Antoni Zawistowski (1882–1942), Polish priest
- Daria Zawistowska (born 1995), Polish handball player
- Joseph Zawistowski (1918–2001), American bishop
- Kazimiera Zawistowska (1870–1902), Polish poet
- Paweł Zawistowski (born 1984), Polish footballer
- Sophie Zawistowska, 1979 novel Sophie's Choice and 1982 film character
- Tadeusz Józef Zawistowski (1930–2015), Polish bishop
- Tami Zawistowski, American politician
- Weronika Zawistowska (born 1999), Polish footballer
