= Eugene Magyar =

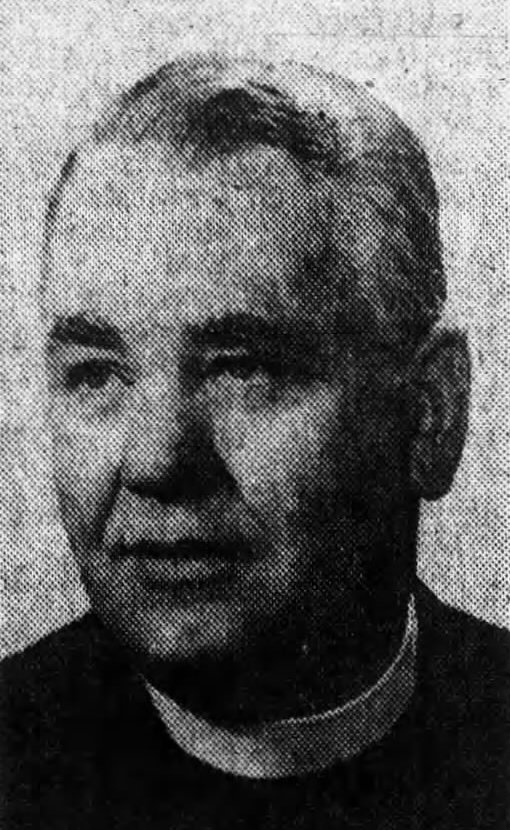
Eugene Magyar

Eugene W. Magyar (July 17, 1909 - October 19, 1968) was the first and only bishop of the Slovak National Catholic Church, a mission of the Polish National Catholic Church (PNCC) to Slovak Americans in New Jersey, Ohio, Pennsylvania, and New York. Born in Pittsburgh, Pennsylvania and educated through high school in Hungary, Magyar was a graduate of the University of Pittsburgh, Columbia University, the General Theological Seminary of the Episcopal Church, and Savonarola Theological Seminary in Scranton, Pennsylvania. He was ordained to the priesthood on May 14, 1933 and appointed PNCC dean of Slovak parishes in 1958. He was consecrated by Prime Bishop Leon Grochowski on June 29, 1963 for a small diocese based at Most Holy Name of Jesus Slovak National Catholic Cathedral in Passaic, New Jersey. Magyar was pastor of the Passaic congregation from 1938 until his death. In addition to pastoral and ecumenical work, he was a seminary professor, liturgical printer, newspaper editor, and cellist. Bishop Magyar died in New York City at Beth Israel Hospital.

== See also ==
- Slovak National Catholic Church
- Polish National Catholic Church
