= John Zenon Jasinski =

Bishop of the Polish National Catholic Church (1887-1951)

- Bishop of the PNCC
- Native name: Jan Zenon Jasiński
- Diocese: Buffalo-Pittsburgh Diocese of the Polish National Catholic Church
- Elected: June 7, 1928
- Predecessor: Office established
- Successor: Joseph Lesniak

Orders
- Consecration: June 7, 1928 by Francis Hodur, Leon Grochowski, and Valentine Gawrychowski of the Polish National Catholic Church

Personal details
- Born: July 17, 1887
- Died: April 28, 1951 (aged 63)

John Zenon Jasinski (July 17, 1887 - April 28, 1951) was a bishop of the Polish National Catholic Church.

== Biography ==
He was born on July 17, 1887, in Poland. He was consecrated on June 7, 1928, in Scranton, Pennsylvania by Franciszek Hodur with the assistance of Bishop Leon Grochowski and Bishop Valentine Gawrychowski. He died on April 28, 1951.

Polish National Catholic Titles
Preceded by Office Established	Bishop Ordinary of the Buffalo-Pittsburgh Diocese of the Polish National Catholic Church; June 7, 1928 – April 28, 1951	Succeeded by Joseph Lesniak
