= Valentine Gawrychowski =

Polish Catholic bishop

- Bishop of the PNCC
- Native name: Wałenty Gawrychowski
- Diocese: Eastern Diocese of the Polish National Catholic Church
- Elected: August 17, 1924
- Successor: Joseph Lesniak

Orders
- Ordination: 1893 by Wincenty Teofil Popiel of the Roman Catholic Church
- Consecration: August 17, 1924 by Francis Hodur of the Polish National Catholic Church

Personal details
- Born: March 16, 1870
- Died: February 1, 1934 (aged 63)
- Buried: Holy Mother of the Rosary Parish Cemetery, Chicopee, MA

Valentine Gawrychowski, was born March 16, 1870, in Gawrychy, Poland, and was a professor and a Roman Catholic priest, before becoming a priest of the Independent Polish Roman Catholic Church, and later of the Polish National Catholic Church. He was a bishop. He was consecrated on August 17, 1924, by Prime Bishop Francis Hodur, in Scranton, Pennsylvania. He died, aged 63, on February 1, 1934, in the Holy Mother of the Rosary Parish.

== Early life and education ==
He was the son of John and Julia Wierzbocki Gawrychowski and had three brothers and two sisters. Two of his brothers were Roman Catholic priests in Poland, and the third a professor in a high school in Warsaw. His parents were community leaders in Gawrychy, a town named after his family. As a child, he was educated in the grammar and high schools of the town of Suwalki, Poland. In later years he graduated from the academy and seminary in Warsaw. He was ordained a priest of the Roman Catholic Church in Warsaw in 1893 by Archbishop Popiel.

== Career ==
His first sermon, delivered with the ardor of a young and virile youth, was directed against the oppressive rule of Poland by the Russian Czar and the German Emperor. A gendarme of the Czar, attending the service, sought to effect the arrest of the young priest for seditious utterances against the Czar. However, his friends spirited him away and he was taken aboard a ship bound for America to escape exile to Siberia that would have followed his arrest.

In America, he first served as a professor in the Roman Catholic Seminary at Orchard Lake, Michigan. But in 1896, two years after his arrival in the United States, he renounced his vows as a Roman Catholic priest. He became a priest of the Independent Polish Roman Catholic Church and later of the Polish National Catholic Church.

Gawrychowski organized twenty-five parishes, one of which was Holy Mother of the Rosary Parish in Chicopee. He organize, or was pastor of, the churches at Dickson City, Pennsylvania; Buffalo, New York; Chicago, IL.; Baltimore, MD; Bayonne, NJ; Philadelphia, PA.; Central Falls, Rhode Island; Woonsocket, Rhode Island; Bridgeport, Connecticut; and other cities. Adept in organizational ability, Father Gawrychowski was able, in a short period of time, to stabilize a given parish so that the parish could receive a pastor. He would leave to aid other parishes or to organize potential parishes. He was the vice-president of the First General Synod of the Polish National Catholic Church and an active co-worker of Bishop Francis Hodur.

Gawrychowski was elected as a candidate for bishop at the Third General Synod of the Polish National Catholic Church in 1914. He was consecrated in Scranton, Pennsylvania on August 17, 1924, by Prime Bishop Francis Hodur, and was appointed diocesan bishop of the newly formed Eastern Diocese. He returned to Chicopee, Massachusetts, as diocesan bishop in 1925 and assumed the pastorate of Holy Mother of the Rosary Parish. Nearly all of his adult life had been devoted to the organization of new parishes in eastern United States.

When World War I ended and Poland emerged as an independent republic, Gawrychowski was sent to Poland several times on missionary work to establish parishes of the Polish National Catholic Church there. In 1931 Gawrychowski was assigned as Bishop Ordinary of the Polish National Catholic Church in Poland, and fulfilled this temporary assignment until a permanent assignment was made for that position.

== Death ==
Gawrychowski died on February 1, 1934, in the rectory of Holy Mother of the Rosary Parish, 26 Bell Street, Chicopee. He was buried at Holy Mother of the Rosary Parish Cemetery. The cemetery altar, which was constructed in 1961 in his memory and in memory of the organizers of Holy Mother of the Rosary Parish, was built such that his remains are located under the altar steps.

Polish National Catholic Titles
Preceded by Office Established	Bishop Ordinary of the Eastern Diocese of the Polish National Catholic Church; 1925 – February 1, 1934	Succeeded by Joseph Lesniak
Preceded by Władysław Faron	Bishop Ordinary of the Polish Diocese of the Polish National Catholic Church; 1931 - February 1, 1934	Succeeded by Józef Padewski
