= Jan Dawidziuk =

Jan Dawidziuk (December 17, 1937 – March 6, 2012) was the sixth diocesan bishop of the western diocese of the Polish National Catholic Church (which in his time included parishes in the states of Illinois, Wisconsin, Minnesota, Michigan, Indiana, Ohio, Florida, Missouri, and Washington).

Dawidziuk was born in Kolczyn, Poland. He was consecrated bishop in November 1999.

The offices of the diocesan bishop are located in the Chancery of the Western Diocese in Park Ridge, Illinois and the cathedra or chair of the bishop is located at All Saints Cathedral Polish National Catholic Church in Chicago.

He served as diocesan bishop from 2003 to 2009. His immediate predecessor was Robert M. Nemkovich, who was diocesan bishop from 1994 until 2003, and his successor is Anthony D. Kopka, who assumed the office on July 1, 2009.

Dawidziuk died in Parma, Ohio, on March 6, 2012, of heart problems.
