= Toronto Cathedral =

Toronto Cathedral may refer to:

- the Anglican Cathedral of St James
- the Roman Catholic Cathedral of St Michael
- the Polish National Catholic Cathedral of St John
- the Macedonian Orthodox Cathedral of St Clement of Ohrid
- the Ukrainian Orthodox Cathedral of St Vlodymyr
