= Padewski =

Padewski (feminine: Padewska) is a Polish-language toponymic surname which literally means "from Padua", "of Padua" (Polish: z Padwy). For example, saint Anthony of Padua is called "Antoni Padewski" in Polish. Notable people with the surname include:

- Józef Padewski (1894–1951), bishop of Polish National Catholic Church
- Stanislaw Padewski (1932–2017), Roman Catholic bishop
