= Walter Slowakiewicz =

American Polish Catholic priest

Walter Andrew Slowakiewicz (May 20, 1911 – October 19, 1978) was born in Shenandoah, Pennsylvania. He was ordained to the priesthood in the Polish National Catholic Church by Leon Grochowski on March 3, 1933, in Scranton, Pennsylvania. He was consecrated bishop on June 26, 1968, and served as fourth bishop of the Eastern Diocese of the Polish National Catholic Church based in Manchester, New Hampshire from 1972 until his death.
