= John E. Mack (bishop) =

American bishop of the Polish National Catholic Church

John Mack (born September 15, 1955 in Detroit, MI) is an American clergyman of Polish descent and a bishop of the Buffalo-Pittsburgh diocese in the Polish National Catholic Church (PNCC).

== Biography ==
Educated as a musician and musicologist, he took piano lessons and earned a degree in the history of music from the University of Michigan in Dearborn, MI. From 1976 to 1983, he served as an organist at his family's parish in Detroit.

In 1983, he married and entered the Girolamo Savonarola Theological Seminary in Scranton. On December 11, 1985, he received priestly ordination from Bishop Francis Carl Rowinski. He served as a pastor in Ware, MA (1985-1989), Carnegie, PA (1989-2000), Washington, PA (2000-2011), and at the cathedral parish in Scranton, PA (2011-2012). Since 2012, he has been the pastor of the cathedral parish in Lancaster, PA.

In 2006, the XXII Synod of the Polish National Catholic Church in Manchester elected him Bishop-elect of the Polish National Catholic Church. He received episcopal consecration on November 30, 2006, in Scranton. He served as an auxiliary bishop in the Buffalo-Pittsburgh diocese of the Polish National Catholic Church. From 2011 to 2012, he was the bishop of the Central Diocese of the Polish National Catholic Church. Since 2012, he has been the bishop of the Buffalo-Pittsburgh diocese of the Polish National Catholic Church.

On behalf of the Union of Scranton, he oversees the Old Catholic mission in Italy (Deanery of the PNCC in Italy).
