= Joseph Kardas =

Joseph E. Kardas (September 22, 1898 – July 8, 1958) was a Polish-born bishop of the Polish National Catholic Church in the United States. He was ordained to the priesthood by Franciszek Hodur on July 24, 1932, in Scranton, Pennsylvania. He was consecrated bishop at Holy Mother of the Rosary Cathedral in Buffalo, New York on September 2, 1954, and served as diocesan Bishop of the Western Diocese of the Polish National Catholic Church from 1955 until his death.
