= Stanley Bilinski =

American bishop (1953–2018)

Stanley M. Bilinski Jr. (Stanisław Biliński, July 11, 1953 - November 2, 2018) was a bishop of the Western Diocese of Polish National Catholic Church, based in Chicago, Illinois. He studied at Wayne State University, Savonarola Theological Seminary in Scranton, and the College of St. Rose in Albany before ordination to the priesthood on May 2, 1979. He was consecrated on September 14, 2012, in St. Stanislaus Cathedral, Scranton.
