= Slovak National Catholic Church =

The Slovak National Catholic Church was an American denomination affiliated with the Polish National Catholic Church. In 1968 the church had "about 6000 members." In February 1963, a synod was held that appointed Eugene Magyar as bishop. In 2015 there were 7000 people affiliated with the church.

== Congregations ==
There were a number of independent congregations. From 1909 to 1926 there was a parish in Masontown, Pennsylvania. There were parishes in Cleveland (St. John the Baptist) in 1917 and in Youngstown, Ohio.

A congregation was formed in Palmerton, Pennsylvania during World War I, as a result of ethnic tensions between Slovaks and Hungarians.

In 1922 parishioners of St. Mary's Assumption Roman Catholic Parish in Passaic, New Jersey were upset when the Bishop of Newark, John J. O'Connor, decided to send their pastor, Imrich Jeczusko, back to Košice, Slovakia. They decided to establish Holy Name of Jesus Slovak National Parish. In 1927 the parish joined the Polish National Catholic Church. The parish celebrated its fiftieth anniversary in 1972. The parish church was eventually made a cathedral. In 2005 the parish membership was "about 160 people from 95 families".

From the 1930s to the 1950s there were Slovak National parishes in Braddock, Pennsylvania, and in McKeesport, Pennsylvania.
