= Casimir J. Grotnik =

American bishop (1935-2016)

Casimir J. Grotnik (1935–2005) was a priest and bishop of the Polish National Catholic Church (PNCC).

Casimir Grotnik was born in 1935 in Jeziorzany, Poland, to Franciszek and Apolonia Jablonski Grotnik. He was ordained a priest on April 20, 1958, by the bishop of Lublin, Piotr Kalawa. Grotnik immigrated to the United States in 1969 and served as a priest in the Central Diocese of the Polish National Catholic Church. In 1996, Grotnik received a doctorate in Old Catholic historical theology at the Christina Theological Academy in Warsaw, Poland. He was consecrated a bishop in November 1999. From that point, he served as the bishop ordinary of the Central Diocese and the pastor of St. Stanislaus Polish National Catholic Cathedral in Scranton, Pennsylvania, until his death on December 9, 2005.

As the bishop ordinary of the Central Diocese, Grotnik was preceded by Bishop Anthony Rysz, and succeeded by Bishop Anthony Mikovsky.

== Works ==
- A Fifty Year Index to Polish American Studies, 1944–1993, East European Monographs, 1998, ISBN 978-0-88033-392-4
- The Polish National Catholic Church, East European Monographs, 2002, ISBN 978-0-88033-501-0
- The Polish National Catholic Church of America: Minutes of the Supreme Council, 1904–1969, East European Monographs, 2004, ISBN 978-0-88033-561-4
- Synods of the Polish National Catholic Church, East European Monographs, 1993, ISBN 978-0-88033-269-9

== Notes ==
Preceded by Anthony Rysz	Bishop of the Central Diocese; 1999–2005	Succeeded by Anthony Mikovsky
