= Józef Padewski =

Polish bishop (1894–1951)

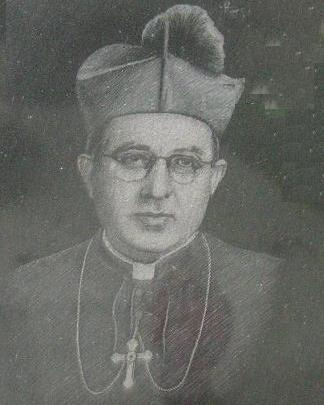
Józef Padewski

Józef Padewski (18 February 1894, in Antoniów, Masovian Voivodeship – 10 May 1951, in Warsaw) was the bishop of the Polish Diocese of the Polish National Catholic Church (PNCC) (a church based in the United States).

== Early life ==
In 1913, he finished secondary school in Krasnystaw, Lublin Voivodeship and, along with a wave of Polish workers, emigrated to Detroit, where he completed his secondary education and learned the English language. While in Detroit, he established contact with the Polish National Catholic Church. In 1916, he began studies at the Savonarola Theological Seminary of the Polish National Catholic Church in Scranton, Pennsylvania. On 16 December 1919, he was admitted to the clergy at the hands of Franciszek Hodur, the Prime Bishop of the PNCC. In 1931, he returned to Poland in order to help to build the PNCC in his homeland. He was initially helped by Bishop Leon Grochowski.

== Bishop of the PNCC ==
In January 1933, during a meeting of the Church Council in Warsaw, held under the leadership of Bishop Franciszek Hodur, Padewski became the chairman of the Church Council and the administrator of the PNCC in Poland. He was chosen as bishop during the second PNCC synod in 1935 and was ordained as bishop on 26 August 1936, in Scranton.

During World War II, he participated in the defence of the PNCC and in the conference that admitted the PNCC to the Union of Utrecht of Old Catholic Churches.

In early September 1942, Padewski was arrested by the occupying forces and was imprisoned in Kraków. He was moved to Tittmoning, Bavaria, where the future Roman Catholic Pope Benedict XVI had lived ten years previously as a small child. Padewski was released from captivity during an exchange of prisoners of war organised by the Swiss Red Cross.

In 1944, he once again emigrated to the United States.

== Postwar years and death ==
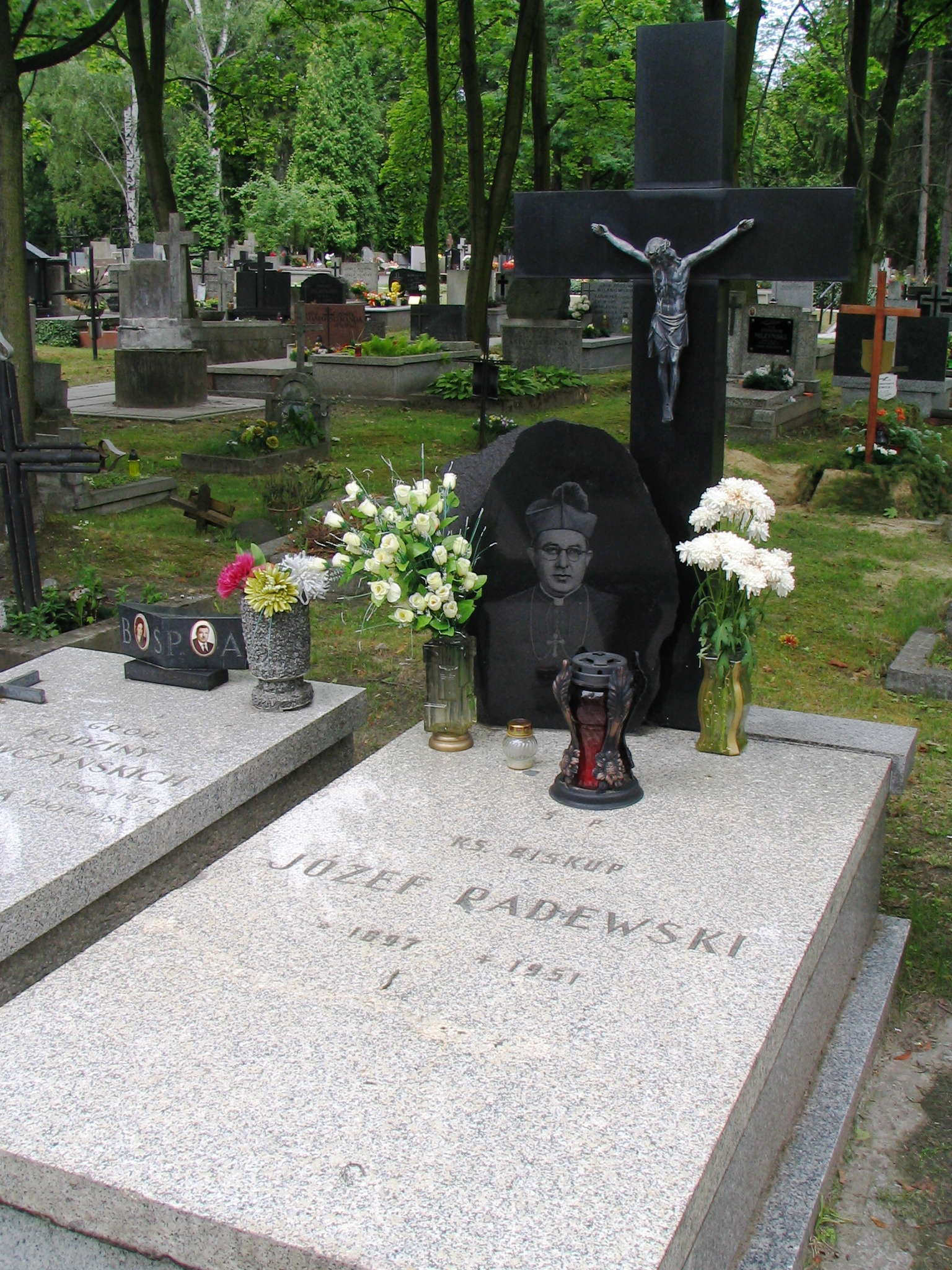
Grave of Padewski at Powązki Military Cemetery

He returned to Poland on 20 February 1946 in order to provide pastoral care to the Polish clergy. He was soon accused of illegally handling foreign currency. However, that was seen as a pretext, and his arrest was viewed as a political plot.

Around this time, Tomasz Kołakowski, one of the priests of the PNCC in Poland, managed to evade the Communist authorities and escape to the United States. There, he revealed the Katyn massacre to the American public. The Communist authorities in Poland then viewed the PNCC in Poland as being taken over by American imperialism.

Padewski was betrayed by clergy within the Polish PNCC anxious to gain favour with the Communist authorities. He was arrested on 17 January 1951.

He was held in a political Mokotów Prison in Warsaw. In this prison, on 10 May 1951, he was tortured to death by officers of the Ministry of Public Security of Poland (MBP). The authorities falsified his autopsy and claimed that he died by natural causes.

His funeral, in the PNCC cemetery in Warsaw, was conducted during the night of 14 May 1951, by a team of his closest colleagues. Officers of the MBP surrounded the area. Padewski is buried at Powązki Military Cemetery in Warsaw.
