= Covenant Presbyterian Church (Chicago) =

- Covenant Presbyterian Church of Chicago
- The White Cathedral
- Katedra Wszystkich Świętych

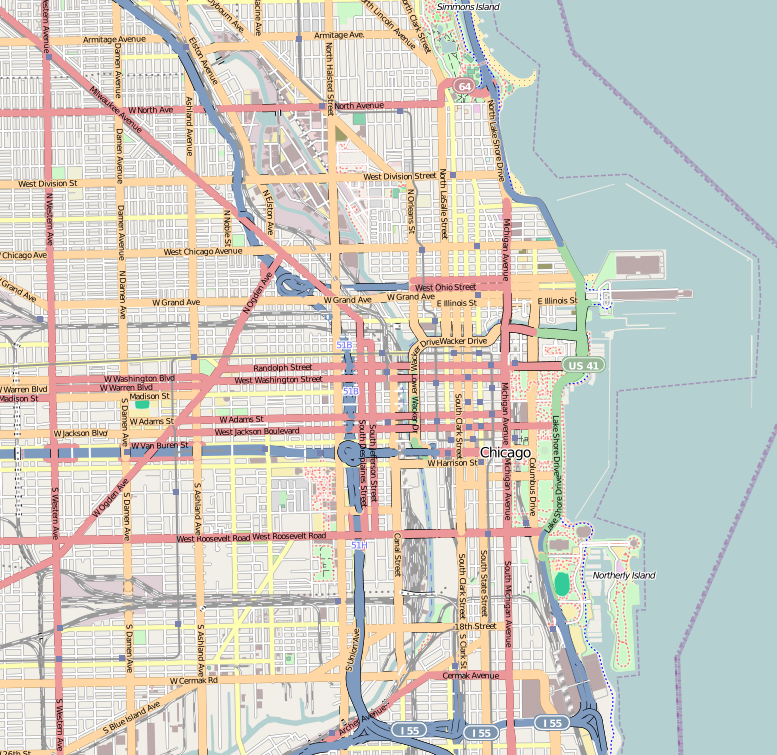
- Location within Central Chicago
- 41°55′10.8″N 87°40′42.1″W
- Location: 2012 W Dickens Avenue, Chicago, Illinois
- Country: United States
- Denomination: Presbyterian Church in America
- Previous denomination: Polish National Catholic Church
- Churchmanship: Evangelical, Reformed
- Website: covenantchicago.org

History
- Former name: All Saints Cathedral
- Founded: 1895 (All Saints Cathedral), 1981 (Covenant Presbyterian)
- Dedicated: June 14, 1931
- Events: Sold to Covenant Presbyterian Church (1993)

Architecture
- Architect: John G. Steinbach
- Architectural type: Cathedral
- Style: Neo-Gothic

Specifications
- Width: 63 feet (19 m)
- Height: 54 feet (16 m)
- Materials: White imitation cement stone

The former Cathedral of All Saints of the Polish National Catholic Church in Chicago, referred to in Polish as Katedra Wszystkich Świętych is a historic church building located in the Bucktown neighborhood of Chicago in Cook County, Illinois, United States. Colloquially referred to as the White Cathedral, it is a prime example of the so-called Polish Cathedral style in both opulence and scale. Along with St. Wenceslaus, St. Mary of the Angels, and Holy Trinity, it is one of the many monumental Polish churches visible from the Kennedy Expressway. Due to the building's high maintenance costs it was sold in December 1993 and now houses Covenant Presbyterian Church of Chicago, a church affiliated with the Presbyterian Church in America. A former chapel at All Saints Polish National Catholic Cemetery on Higgins Avenue and River Road was expanded and now houses the current Cathedral of the Western Diocese of the Polish National Catholic Church.

== All Saints Cathedral ==
The congregation that founded All Saints was formed in 1895 from a group of disgruntled former parishioners of St. Hedwig's which is only three blocks north of the church. Resentful of the dominance of the Resurrectionist Order and dismayed with the Catholic Church hierarchy in the U.S., tensions arose within St. Hedwig's parish. This culminated in the so-called "Pepper Riots", where a crowd of 3,000 protesters broke into the foyer and assaulted the priests. When the police intervened, the protesters notably threw red pepper into their eyes. The result was that shots were fired and dozens were injured, including one policeman who was struck by a hammer. The disgruntled anti-Resurrectionist faction broke off from the parish to form an independent church, which became All Saints Cathedral of the Polish National Catholic Church.

== Covenant Presbyterian ==
The core group of Covenant Presbyterian Church gathered in 1981. This group was officially organized as a church of the Presbyterian Church in America in 1982. Until 1993, the congregation worshiped in rented spaces in the Lincoln Park neighborhood. In December 1993 Covenant PCA purchased the All Saints Cathedral building. In 2007 the church planted its first daughter church in Lincoln Square. Its second daughter church was planted in Oak Park, Illinois in 2017.

== Architecture ==
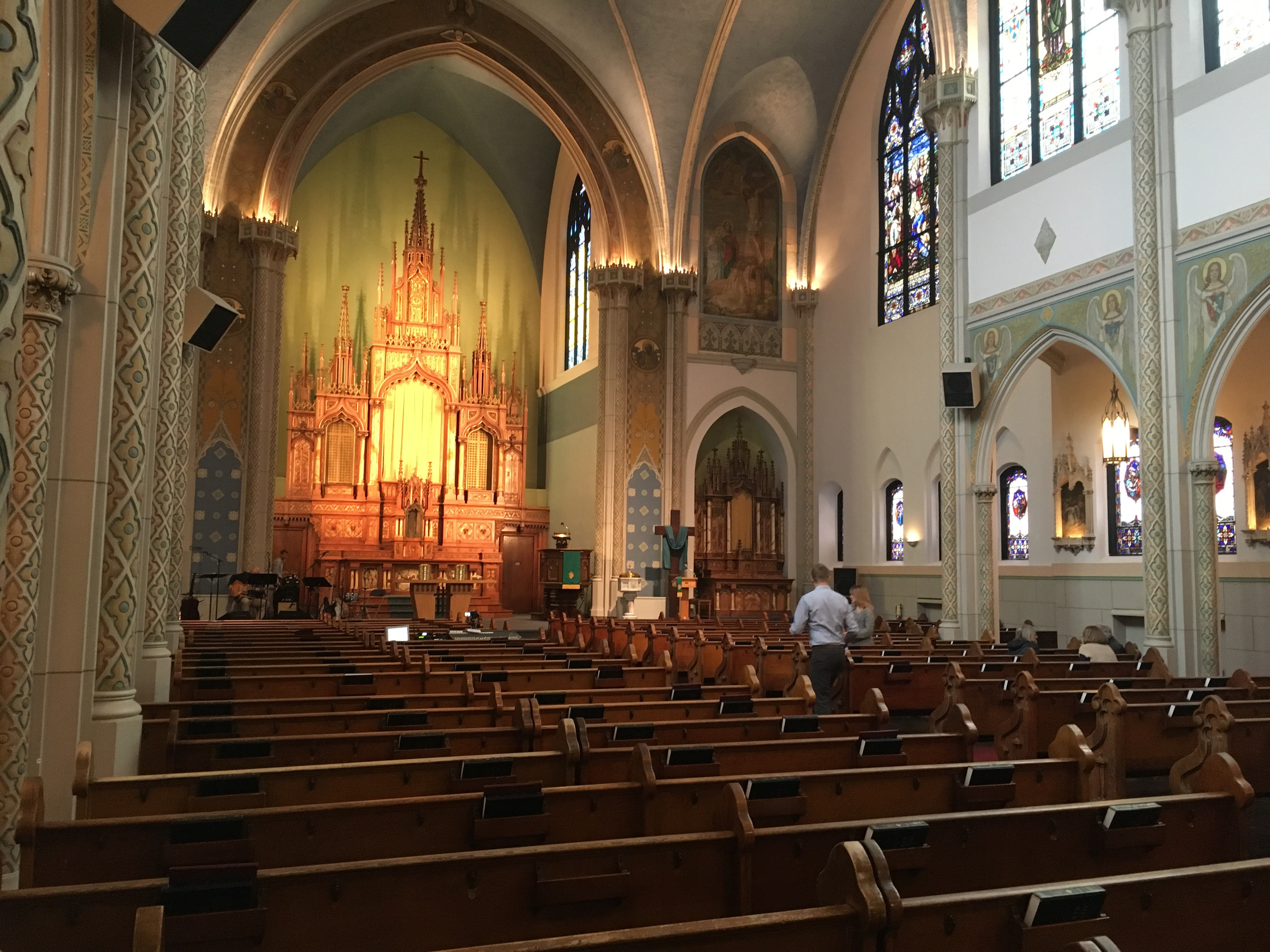
The nave of Covenant Presbyterian Church in Chicago, the former national cathedral of the Polish National Catholic Church.

Dedicated in the midst of the Great Depression on June 14, 1931, the church was designed by John G. Steinbach who later partnered with another local architect to form the noted firm of Worthmann and Steinbach which drew up the architectural plans for many of the Northwest Side's Polish American churches as well as parts of the campus of Loyola University Chicago. Its Gothic architecture clearly differentiates it from the Renaissance style favored by the Resurrectionist Order, representing the more populist nature of the Polish National Catholic Church. Measuring only 63 feet in width, Steinbach's design makes effective use of the site. Built in the form of a cross, its two towers are each 135 feet in height while the center frame reached a height of 54 feet. Like most other Polish Cathedrals, it was originally designed with an exterior of brick and terracotta, which was later changed to white imitation cement stone. Although more expensive than natural limestone, the material is also more durable, giving the church the appearance of Joliet Limestone that decorates such famous Chicago area landmarks such as the Chicago Water Tower or the old Statesville Prison. Set among the intricate carving above the main entrance is the emblem of the Polish National Catholic Church adopted at the Synod of Scranton in 1904 which depicts a book, above which rises the bright sun of freedom, light and warmth, surrounded to the right by the cross and to the left by the palm. Emblazoned on the streamer beneath is an inscription in Polish: Prawdą, Pracą, Walką, which translates into English as "with truth, with work, with struggle", a motto by which Christian values are to be brought into life. The interior decorations are especially suited to All Saints' former status as a cathedral. Dominating the Dickens Avenue facade is a massive stained glass window installed in the early 1940s which portrays Saint Cecilia, the patroness of Music above the shield of the Western Diocese. All the paintings are on canvas and the Gothic motif is reflected throughout in the shrines, altars, Stations of the Cross and the canopies over the doorways. There are strong parallels between the church's internal painting scheme with its art nouveau-like flairs and the painter of many of Kraków's most famous Gothic churches Stanisław Wyspiański, making the church unique in this respect among Chicago's Polish churches. The main altar was imported from Italy, a gift of the ladies rosary sodality, and was originally designed to have its paintings change to reflect the different seasons of the liturgical year, a unique innovation. The Christmas season would have featured Mary and the Child Jesus; Lent, Jesus on the Cross; and Easter, the Resurrected Savior. The hand-carved altar rails, now removed, had portrayed The Passion of the Christ through such powerful symbols as palm, snake, wheat, fish, bread baskets, money bags, chalice, reed and rooster. Several of the other stained glass windows commemorate Polish Saints and writers, while the angels painted along the nave walls carry the crests of cities in Poland where the immigrants hailed from. The small altars along the east and west walls were carved by former parishioner Jan Wellnitz and were originally installed in the 1910 church located next door. While the former Cathedral of All Saints is often overshadowed by its more famous Roman Catholic sister churches such as the Basilica of St. Hyacinth, it is nonetheless highly regarded as a beautiful specimen of Chicago's historic church architecture. The church was featured in the Landmarks Preservation Council of Illinois annual tour of Chicago's historic churches and synagogues, and the site of a lecture delivered by historian Dominic Pacyga as well as Vincent Michael the director of Chicago Programs at the Landmarks Preservation Council of Illinois on its behalf. The Curt Teich Postcard Archives at the Lake County Discovery Museum in Wauconda has among its collection a postcard of the church interior dating from the early 1940s.

== See also ==
- Polish Cathedral style churches of Chicago
- Polish American
- Poles in Chicago
- Roman Catholicism in Poland

== Bibliography ==
- Kozak, Adeline Szymaniak (1996). The history of All Saints Cathedral of the Polish National Catholic Church, Chicago, Illinois. Chicago: All Saints Cathedral Parish.
