= Gromiec =

- Village
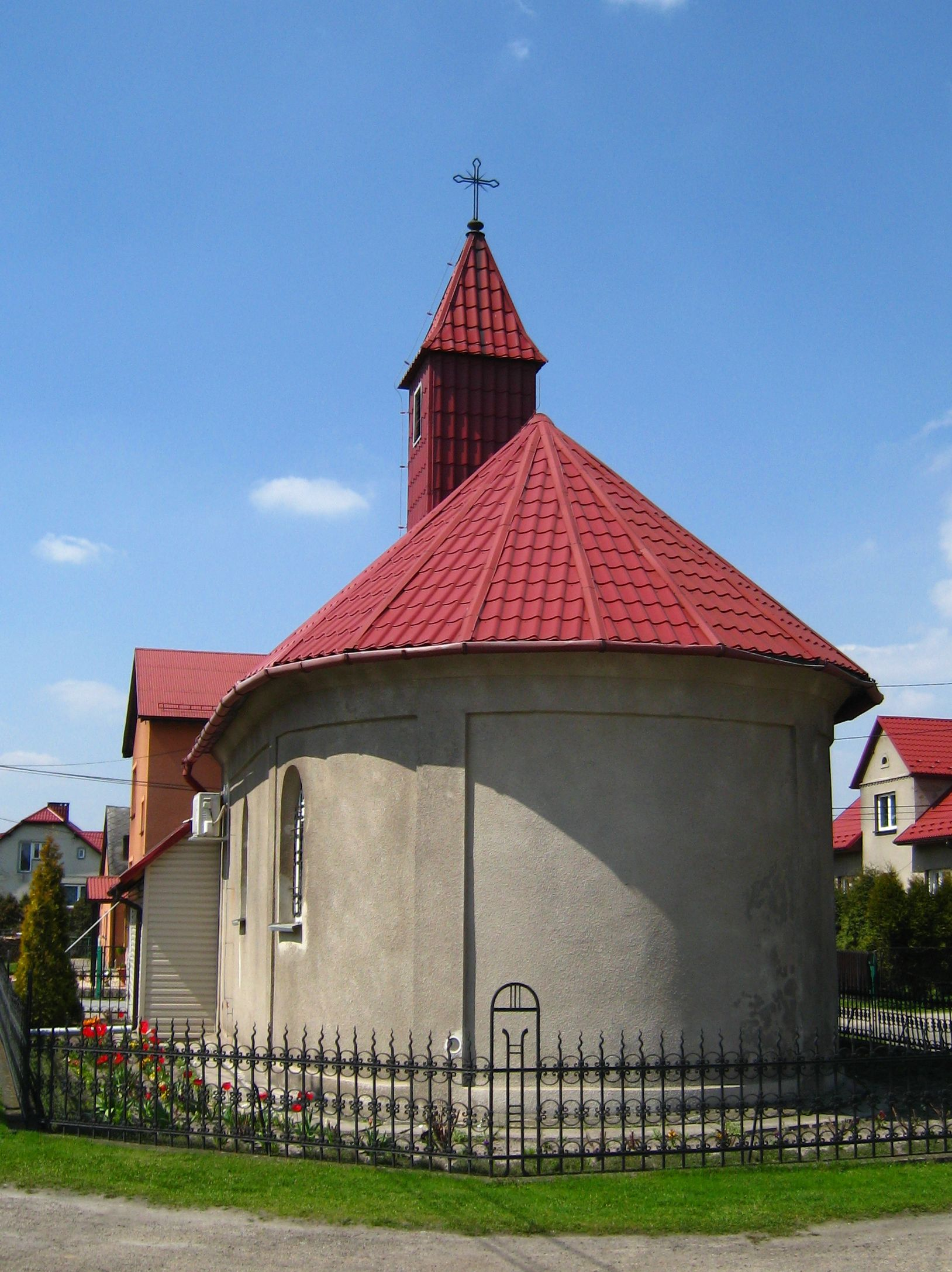
- Catholic church

- Location within Poland
- Coordinates: 50°3′34″N 19°17′40″E
- Country: Poland
- Voivodeship: Lesser Poland
- County: Chrzanów
- Gmina: Libiąż
- Population: 1,700

Gromiec [ˈɡrɔmjɛt͡s] is a village in the administrative district of Gmina Libiąż, within Chrzanów County, Lesser Poland Voivodeship, in southern Poland.
