= John Swantek =

Polish Catholic prelate (1933–2022)

The Most Reverend John Swantek
- Prime Bishop of the Polish National Catholic Church
- Elected: 1985
- Installed: 1986
- Term ended: 2002
- Predecessor: Francis Rowinski
- Successor: Robert M. Nemkovich

Orders
- Consecration: 1978

Personal details
- Born: 15 May 1933; Cheshire, Connecticut, United States
- Died: 7 January 2022 (aged 88); Scranton, Pennsylvania, United States
- Spouse: Arlene Miskiavitch Swantek

John F. Swantek (15 May 1933 – 7 January 2022) was a Polish Catholic prelate who was the prime bishop of the Polish National Catholic Church from 1986 until his resignation in 2002. He died on January 7, 2022, at the age of 88.

Polish National Catholic Titles
Preceded by Francis Rowinski	Prime Bishop; 1985–2002	Succeeded by Robert M. Nemkovich
