= Joseph Zawistowski =

Joseph C. Zawistowski (April 19, 1918 – September 23, 2001) was born in Rochester, New York. He was ordained to the priesthood (as the first son of a priest to be ordained in the Polish National Catholic Church) on January 14, 1948. He was consecrated bishop in Scranton, Pennsylvania on November 30, 1968, and served as Bishop Ordinary of the Western Diocese of the Polish National Catholic Church. He retired on April 19, 1994.
