= John Mack (athletic director) =

American athletic director (born 1977)

Current position
- Title: Athletic director
- Team: Princeton
- Conference: Ivy League

Biographical details
- Education: Princeton University, Northwestern University

Playing career
- 1996–2000: Princeton
- Position: Track and field

Coaching career (HC unless noted)
- 2002–2004: Princeton (assistant)

Administrative career (AD unless noted)
- 2000–2004: Princeton (Assistant director of intercollegiate programming)
- 2004–2006: Big Ten Conference (Associate director of championships)
- 2006–2011: Northwestern (Associate AD)
- 2021–present: Princeton

Accomplishments and honors

Awards
- William Winston Roper Trophy (2000)

John Mack (born 6 December 1977) is the current director of athletics for Princeton University. He previously served as associate athletic director at Northwestern University from 2006 to 2011, before spending 10 years in the legal field as a practicing lawyer. Mack attended college at Princeton University, where he was a sprinter on the school's track and field team, winning the 2000 William Winston Roper Trophy as the university's top male senior athlete. Mack was named athletic director at Princeton University on August 25, 2021.
