= St. John's Cathedral (Toronto) =

- St. John's Cathedral Polish Catholic Church
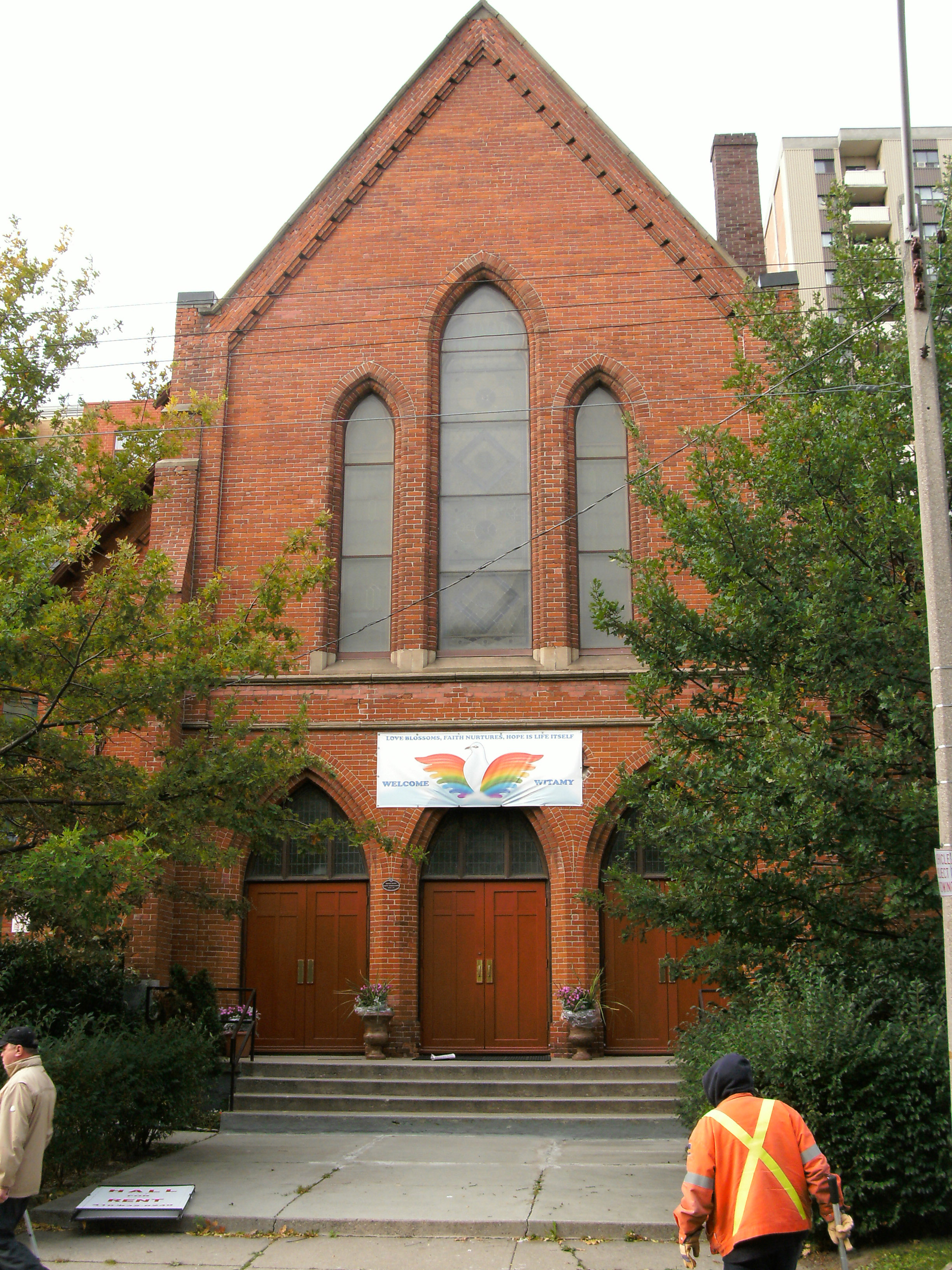
- St. John's Cathedral
- 43°38′23″N 79°25′57.3″W
- Location: 186 Cowan Avenue, Toronto, Ontario
- Country: Canada
- Denomination: Polish National Catholic Church

St. John's Cathedral Polish Catholic Church in the Parkdale area of Toronto, Ontario, is the seat of the Polish National Catholic Church's (PNCC) diocese in Canada.

== History ==
In 2004 some members of the parish asked to be received back into the Utrecht Union, from which the PNCC had seceded when the Union decided to accept the ordination of women and homosexuals. The International Bishops' Conference of the Union in 2004 "decided that the parish would be placed under the direct jurisdiction of the Archbishop of Utrecht until further discussions have taken place." There is now an ongoing litigation between the Polish National Catholic Church on one side and the parishioners who have reconciled with the Union. The matters are pending in the Ontario Superior Court of Justice. Litigation was also commenced against certain members of the Union of Utrecht government in order to restrain their alleged interference in the affairs of the PNCC. St. John's continues to be the seat of the PNCC's Canadian diocese in name, but it continues to be occupied by the former members of the church. The PNCC parishioners worship in a nearby United church.

In 2005, the conference "decided that the parish would be recognised as an Old Catholic parish of the Union of Utrecht." An Old Catholic bishop would be delegated to the parish but the Anglican Bishop of Toronto, the Right Reverend Colin Johnson, would be asked to provide regular episcopal ministry. The conference was not prepared to assume legal or financial responsibility for the parish.

As of May 2009, St. John's Cathedral has reconciled with the Scranton-based Polish National Catholic Church and is once again the official cathedral of the Canadian diocese of the PNCC.
