= Gmina Libiąż =

Gmina Libiąż Libiąż Commune
- Gmina
- Coat of arms
- Interactive map of Gmina Libiąż
- Coordinates (Libiąż): 50°6′N 19°19′E
- Country: Poland
- Voivodeship: Lesser Poland
- County: Chrzanów
- Seat: Libiąż

Area
  - Total: 57.2 km^{2} (22.1 sq mi)

Population (2006)
  - Total: 22,900
  - Density: 400/km^{2} (1,040/sq mi)
  - Urban: 17,604
  - Rural: 5,296
- Website: https://www.libiaz.pl/

Gmina Libiąż is an urban-rural gmina (administrative district) in Chrzanów County, Lesser Poland Voivodeship, in southern Poland. Its seat is the town of Libiąż, which lies approximately 8 kilometres (5 mi) south-west of Chrzanów and 45 km (28 mi) west of the regional capital Kraków.

The gmina covers an area of 57.2 square kilometres (22.1 sq mi), and as of 2006 its total population is 22,900 (out of which the population of Libiąż amounts to 17,604, and the population of the rural part of the gmina is 5,296).

== Villages ==
Apart from the town of Libiąż, the gmina also contains the villages of Gromiec and Żarki.

== Neighbouring gminas ==
Gmina Libiąż is bordered by the towns of Jaworzno and Oświęcim, and by the gminas of Babice, Chełmek, Chrzanów and Oświęcim.
