= Johnny Mac (disambiguation) =

Johnny Mac (John McEnroe, born 1959) is an American retired tennis player.

Johnny Mac may also refer to:

- John McDonald (infielder) (born 1974), American baseball player
- John McDonnell (footballer) (born 1965), Irish football manager and former footballer
