= Bernard Nowicki =

Bishop in Polish National Catholic Church

Bernard Nowicki is bishop of the Central Diocese of the Polish National Catholic Church. An alumnus of the University of Pittsburgh, he was consecrated on September 14, 2012, in succession to Bishop John Mack.

Bishop Bernard Nowicki – Bishop of the Polish National Catholic Church in the USA and Canada with Polish roots, Ordinary of the Central Diocese of PNKK, parish priest in the Cathedral of St. Stanislaw in Scranton.

Bernard Nowicki graduated from the Theological Seminary. The Girolamo Savonaroli in Scranton, then ordained a priest. He was elected bishop during the Extraordinary Synod of the Polish National Catholic Church on June 22, 2012.[1] Bishop's ordination took place on September 14, 2012 in the Cathedral of St. Stanislaw in Scranton. Bishop Nowicki was introduced into office as the ninth Ordinary of the Central Diocese of PNKK, then in November 2012 he additionally took up the parish in the Cathedral of St. Stanislaus in Scranton[2].

Bishop Bernard Nowicki is married, his wife is from Dupont (PA).
