= Thaddeus Zielinski =

Polish Catholic bishop (1904–1990)

The Most Reverend Thaddeus Zielinski D.D.
- Prime Bishop of the Polish National Catholic Church
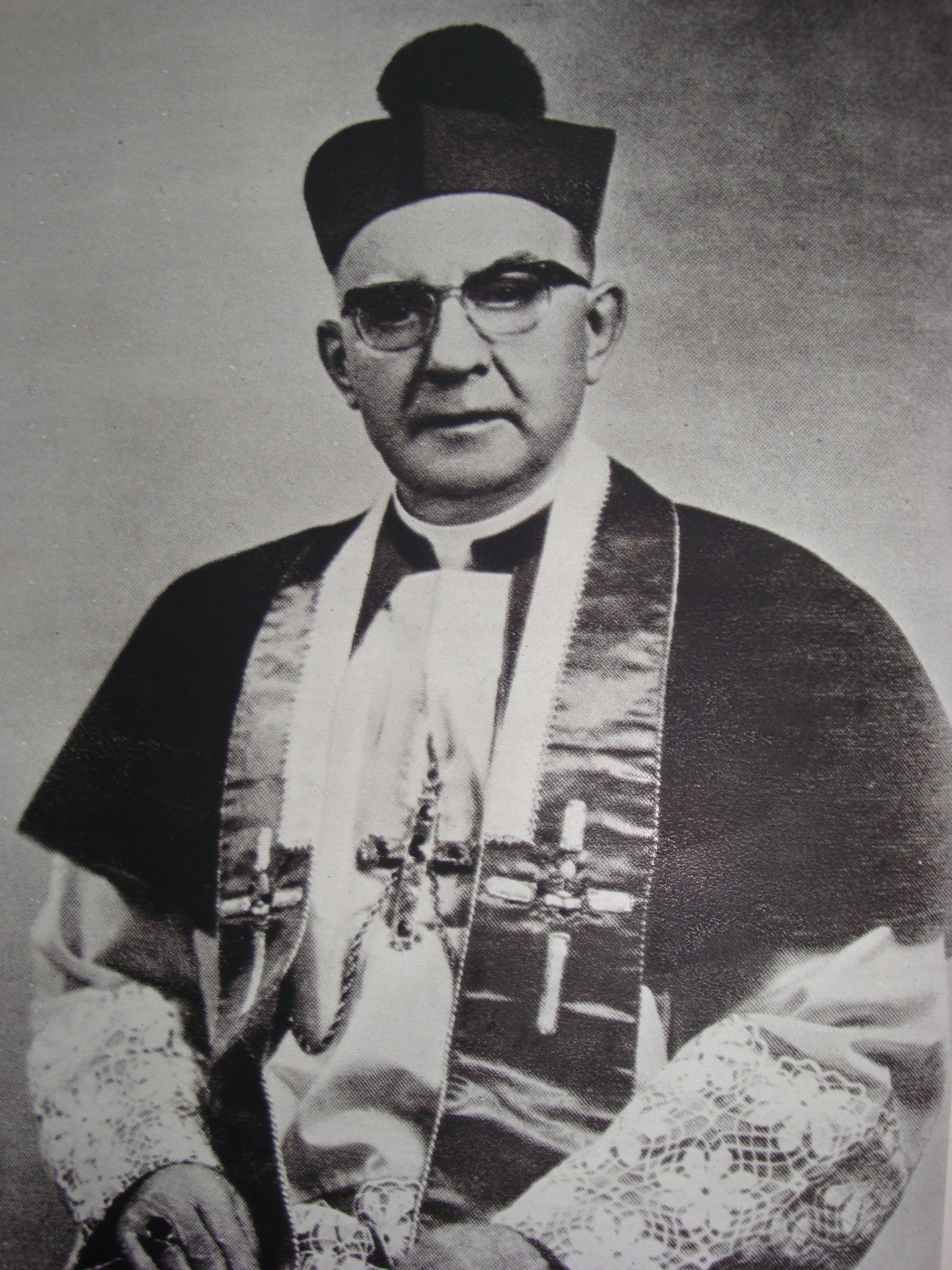
- Zielinski in 1986
- Elected: 1967
- In office: 1969 – 1978
- Predecessor: Leon Grochowski
- Successor: Francis Rowinski

Orders
- Ordination: November 3, 1927
- Consecration: September 2, 1954 by Leon Grochowski

Personal details
- Born: 26 December 1904 Wilkes-Barre, Pennsylvania, United States
- Died: 11 August 1990 (aged 85)
- Buried: Holy Mother of the Rosary Cemetery. Cheektowaga, New York, United States
- Education: Savonarola Theological Seminary

Tadeusz "Thaddeus" F. Zielinski (26 Dec 1904 – 11 Aug 1990) was a bishop of the Polish National Catholic Church (PNCC). Zielinski was born in Wilkes-Barre, Pennsylvania in 1904 to Francis and Mary Kompinski Zielinski. He was consecrated in Buffalo, New York on September 2, 1954 and served as Prime Bishop of the Polish National Catholic Church from 1969 until his retirement in 1978. Zielinski was the first American to serve as a bishop in the PNCC, and likewise, was the first bishop primate born in the United States. Zielinski died on August 11, 1990, at the age of 85 in Scranton, Pennsylvania. During his tenure, the use of the English language, in place of Polish, was popularized with the translation of liturgies and hymns.

Polish National Catholic Titles
Preceded by Leon Grochowski	Prime Bishop; 1969-1978	Succeeded by Francis Rowinski
