= John C. Mack =

American photographer

- Education: Duke University
- Occupations: Photographer, writer

John C. Mack is an American artist, writer, and photographer. In 2021, he founded Life Calling, a not-for-profit organization to help people live fulfilled lives in the digital age while retaining humanity and personal autonomy.

== Career ==
=== Early career ===
Mack served as production assistant in Antarctica on the IMAX documentary film The Endurance: Shackleton's Legendary Antarctic Expedition, and began shooting photography thereafter. In 2002 he moved to Mexico to work, leading to his 2005 collaboration with Susanne Steines as co-author and photographer of the book Xibalbá: Lost Dreams of the Mexican Rainforest.

=== Life Calling Initiative ===
In 2021, Mack founded the Life Calling Initiative, a not-for-profit organization responding to an increasing reliance on technology, and the challenges this reliance presents to people. The organization's mission is to preserve people's humanity by developing educational strategies to avert dangers of the Digital Age. This is achieved through awareness campaigns, education, art, lectures, and programming.

=== A Species Between Worlds ===
One project of the Life Calling Initiative was A Species Between Worlds, an interactive immersive exhibition of artworks by Mack in New York City in 2022. A Species Between Worlds is a gamified examination of the intersection of humanity and technology. Mack was inspired by the Pokémon Go craze and YouTube footage which captured a "Pokémon stampede" in Taipei in 2016. A Species Between Worlds uses augmented-reality (AR) artwork from Pokémon GO spliced with Mack's photography. Mack spent five years photographing the seven wonders of the natural world as well as over 50 national parks. The exhibition used this artwork and an application which guides visitors through a gamified psychological exploration framed by the artifice of the Pokémon Go interface.

=== Revealing Mexico ===
Revealing Mexico was released in 2010 and exhibited in Rockefeller Center's Channel Gardens in New York City that year. Mack photographed everyday Mexican life for its celebrations of 2010, both the bicentennial anniversary of Mexico's independence from Spain and the centennial anniversary of the Mexican Revolution. In addition to the anniversary, given the emphasis in the international press on ongoing violence between the state and narcoterrorism, a need existed to depict a more balanced and holistic impression of the country.

The book includes black-and-white photographs encompassing each of the 31 states and portraits of Mexican writers, business icons, artists, academics and actors.

== Publications ==
- Patient (A John Mack Photo Essay). New York: New York Presbyterian Hospital, 2004.
- Xibalbá, Lost Dreams of the Mexican Rainforest/Los Sueños Perdidos de la Selva Lacandona.
  - Mexico City, Mexico: MVS, 2005.
  - Mexico City, Mexico: MVS, 2008. Second edition.
- Revealing Mexico. Brooklyn, NY: PowerHouse Books, 2010. ISBN 978-1-57687-559-9 . Photographs by Mack, text by Susanne Steines. With a prologue by Teresa del Conde and an interview with Carlos Fuentes.
- At Their Home Marseille. Brooklyn, NY: PowerHouse, 2018. ISBN 978-1576878927. Photographs by Mack.

== Accolades ==
- 2022: Mack was named as one of fifty people "changing the world who the world needs to know about" by The Explorers Club.

== Personal life ==
Mack llives in Seville, Spain.
