= Francis Bonczak =

Francis Bonczak (Franciszek Bończak, December 1, 1881 - September 21, 1967) was a bishop of the Polish National Catholic Church. He was ordained to the priesthood on December 30, 1903, and consecrated on August 17, 1924. He organized Holy Name of Jesus Polish National Catholic Church in Milwaukee, Wisconsin and also served as an organizer of the PNCC in Poland.
