= Thaddeus Peplowski =

American bishop (1936–2018)

Thaddeus Peplowski (Tadeusz Stanisław Pepłowski, November 4, 1936 - January 19, 2018) was bishop of the Buffalo-Pittsburgh Diocese of Polish National Catholic Church from 1990 to 2012.

He was born in Albany, New York and attended Savonarola Theological Seminary. He was ordained to the priesthood on November 11, 1964, and consecrated on November 30, 1990.

Bishop Peplowski was active in the formation of the Nordic Catholic Church and in PNCC theological dialogue with the Orthodox Church and the Roman Catholic Church.

He served twice in the Buffalo, New York area, first as a priest at Holy Mother of the Rosary Cathedral in the 1950s and 1960s, and then from 1990 to 2012 as bishop of the Buffalo-Pittsburgh Diocese.

He died on January 19, 2018.
