= John Misiaszek =

Polish Catholic bishop (1903–1973)

John Misiaszek (June 20, 1903 – 1973) was a bishop of the Polish National Catholic Church. He was consecrated on August 26, 1936, by Franciszek Hodur with the assistance of Bishop Leon Grochowski and Bishop John Zenon Jasinski. He was a major figure in encouraging the use of English in the worship of the PNCC. Misiaszek resigned in 1956 after his marriage to a divorced woman. The Great Council of the Polish National Catholic Church met in Buffalo in September 1956 to examine this matter, and Bishop Misiaszek was succeeded initially by Leon Grochowski.
