= Union of Utrecht (Old Catholic) =

Federation of Old Catholic churches

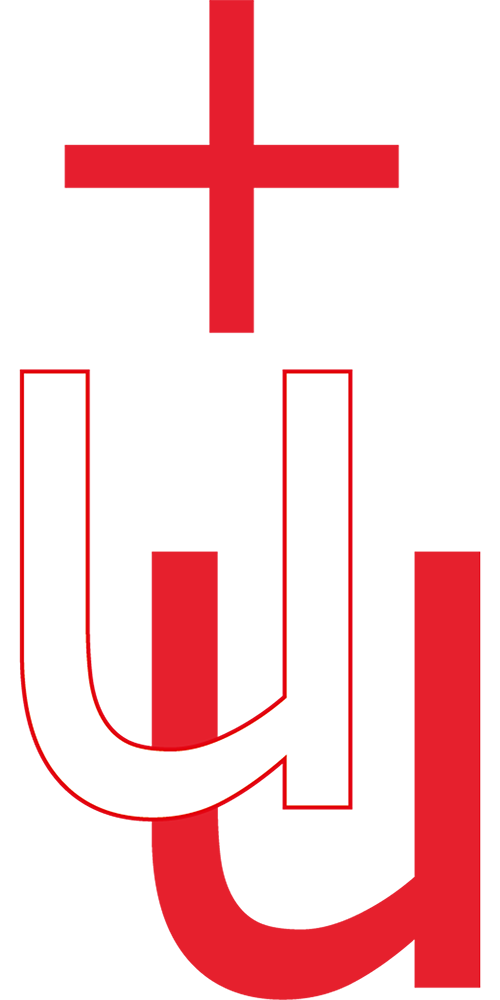
Union of Utrecht of the Old Catholic Churches
- Utrecher Union der Altkatholischen Kirchen
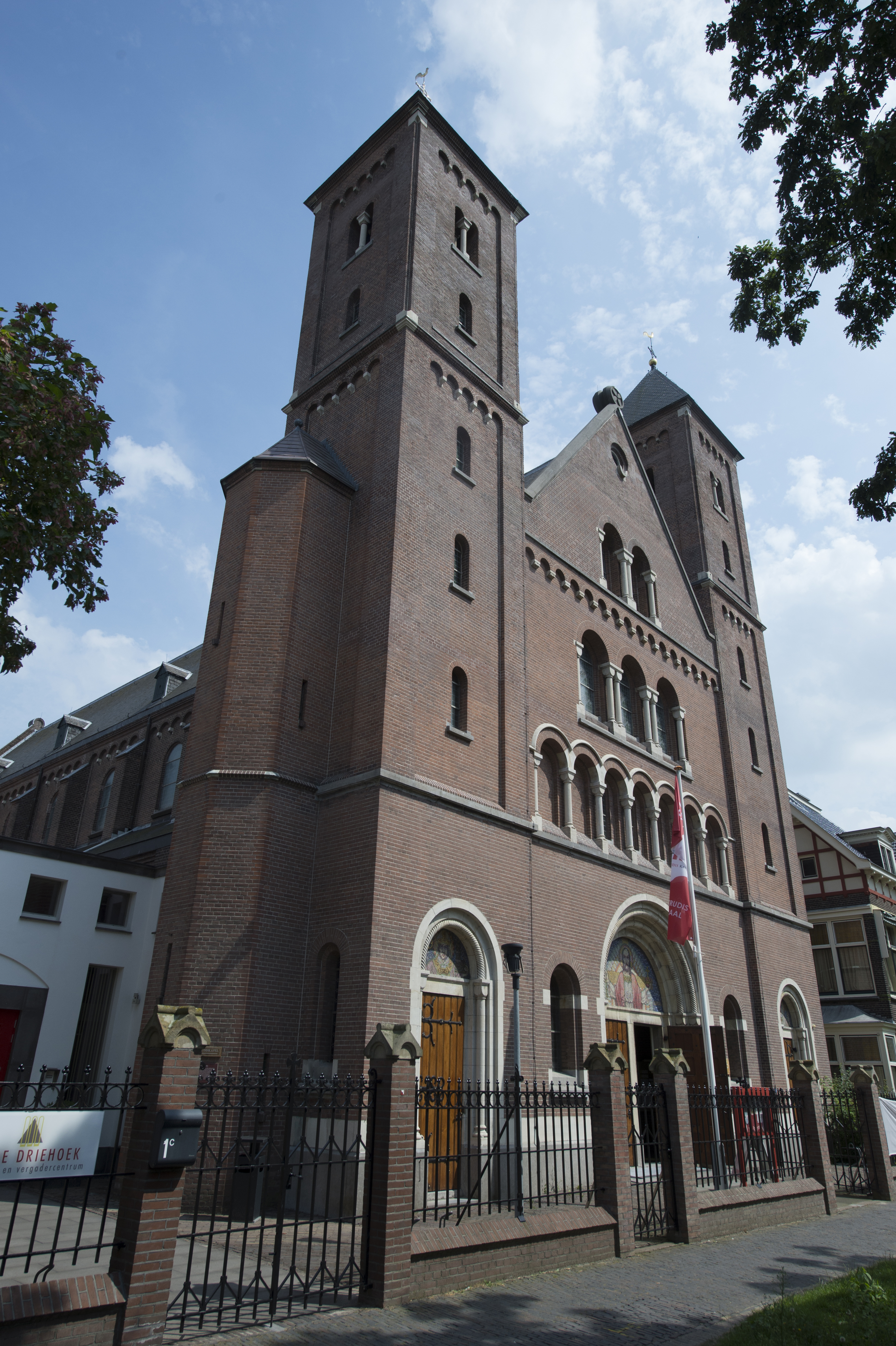
- St. Gertrude's Cathedral is the mother church of the Union, located in Utrecht, Netherlands.
- Abbreviation: UU
- Classification: Old Catholic
- Governance: Episcopal
- Metropolitan of Utrecht: Bernd Wallet
- Associations: World Council of Churches
- Full communion: Anglican Communion; Church of Sweden; Philippine Independent Church; Mar Thoma Syrian Church
- Region: Europe
- Headquarters: Utrecht, Netherlands
- Origin: 1889; Utrecht, Netherlands
- Separated from: Roman Catholic Church
- Separations: Union of Scranton; Old Roman Catholic Churches
- Members: c. 58,806
- Official website: utrechter-union.org/en/welcome/

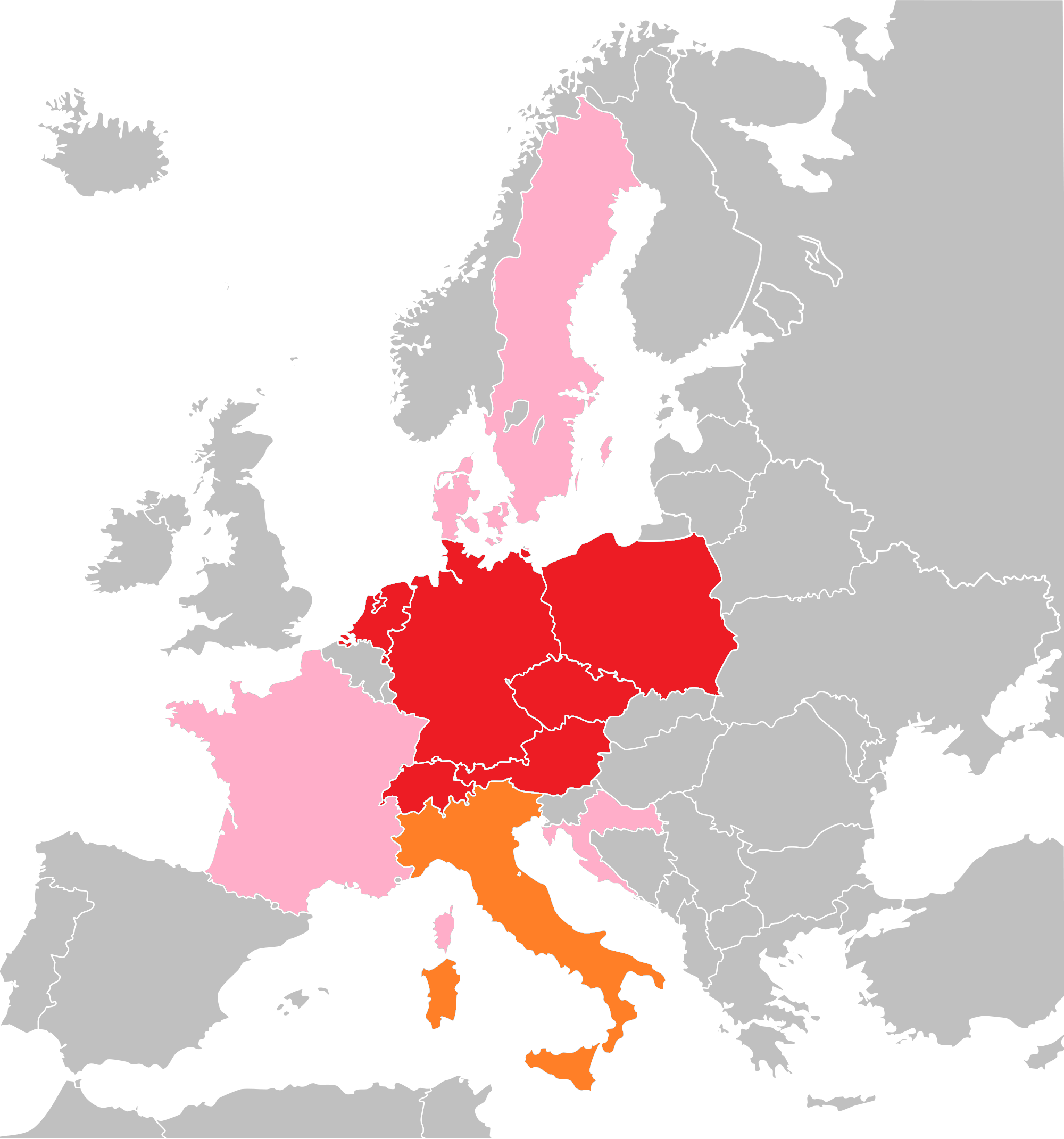
Full members of the Union Dependent jurisdictions Former dependent jurisdictions

The Union of Utrecht of the Old Catholic Churches, most commonly referred to by the short form Union of Utrecht (UU), is a federation of Old Catholic churches, nationally organized from schisms that rejected Roman Catholic doctrines of the First Vatican Council in 1870; its member churches are not in communion with the Roman Catholic Church.

The 1889 Declaration of Utrecht is one of three founding documents together called the Convention of Utrecht. Many provinces of the Union of Utrecht of the Old Catholic Churches are members of the World Council of Churches. The UU is in full communion with the Evangelical Lutheran Church of Sweden; the Anglican Communion through the 1931 Bonn Agreement; the Philippine Independent Church, the Spanish Reformed Episcopal Church, and the Lusitanian Catholic Apostolic Evangelical Church through a 1965 extension of the Bonn Agreement; and the Mar Thoma Syrian Church through the 2024 Thiruvalla agreement.

As of 2016, the UU includes six member churches: the Old Catholic Church of the Netherlands (OKKN), the Catholic Diocese of the Old Catholics in Germany, the Christian Catholic Church of Switzerland, the Old Catholic Church of Austria, the Old Catholic Church of the Czech Republic, and the Polish Catholic Church in Poland. (Note: The organization Polish Catholic Church in Poland, a member church of the UU, is not to be confused with the Catholic Church in Poland or with the Polish National Catholic Church, a former member church of the UU.) The church had approximately 400,000 members in 1992, yet according to statistics from 2016–2025, the Union of Utrecht's current membership was an estimated 58,806 members.

== History ==
=== Foundation and enlargement ===
The mother church, the Old Catholic Church of the Netherlands, was established in the 18th century as a result of tensions between the local Catholic hierarchy and the Roman Curia. The other churches, such as the Catholic Diocese of the Old Catholics in Germany, and the Christian Catholic Church of Switzerland, followed suit after the First Vatican Council, which defined the dogma of papal infallibility. They would become the Union ot Utrecht of the Old Catholic Churches.

=== United States and the British Isles ===
In 1907, Gerardus Gul—seventeenth Utrechter archbishop—consecrated Francis Hodur for the Polish National Catholic Church; and in 1908, Gul consecrated Arnold Harris Mathew for what would later become the Old Roman Catholic Church in Great Britain. Mathew would separate from the Utrechter Old Catholics in 1910, for what he perceived the liberalisation of Continental Old Catholicism.

=== Missionary activity and schisms ===
In the former Yugoslavia, the union had three organized Old Catholic episcopal jurisdictions: Old Catholic Church of Croatia (created in 1922-1923, first bishop Marko Kalojera consecrated in 1924 in Utrecht), Old Catholic Church of Slovenia (with bishops Radovan Jošt and Anton Kovačevič), and Old Catholic Church of Serbia (with bishop Milan Dobrovoljac (1954–1966). Three churches formed "Union of Old-Catholic Churches in Yugoslavia" (1954). This union eventually ceased to exist with break-up of Yugoslavia (1991–1992) and even before that, the Old Catholic bishopric in Serbia was extinguished, and the same happened with bishoprics in Slovenia and Croatia. Finally, remaining Old Catholic parishes in Croatia and other parts of former Yugoslavia were placed under jurisdiction of the Old Catholic Church of Austria.

In 1997, the International Old Catholic Bishops' Conference retracted its 1976 declaration opposing the admission of women into the clergy, allowing the churches to do so and, knowing this would lead to a break in communionship across the member churches, established a 6 year period to restore full communion. In turn, in 1998 the Polish National Catholic Church's general synod put in place a set of guidelines heavily restricting intercommunion with Old Catholic churches that ordained women including forbidding its bishops from being part of consecrations of any bishops from such churches, and vice versa. The conference stated in 2003 that full communion "could not be restored and that therefore, as a consequence, the separation of our Churches follows", which effectively expelled the Polish National Catholic Church.

The Old Catholic Church of Austria approved the blessing of same-sex unions in 1998 without International Old Catholic Bishops' Conference deliberation; in contrast, the Polish National Catholic Church disapproved the blessing of same-sex unions in 2002 and "described homosexual practice as sinful". The Polish National Catholic Church established the Union of Scranton in 2008, and no other North American body has been recognized by the International Old Catholic Bishops' Conference.

The Old Catholic Church of Slovakia was a member church of the Union of Utrecht from 2000 but it was removed from membership in 2004.

In July 2011, the Christian Catholic Church of Switzerland ended its mission to Old Catholic parishes in Italy. "In cooperation with ecumenical partner churches" the parishes were "offered a model that guarantees their continued pastoral care".

== Organization ==
Individual Union of Utrecht member churches maintain a degree of autonomy, similar to the practice of the Anglican Communion. Each diocese of the member churches has a diocesan bishop, and countries with more than one diocese have a bishop who is appointed as "bishop in charge" or a similar title. The primate (primus inter pares leader) of the union is the Archbishop of Utrecht (not to be confused with the Roman Catholic Archbishop of Utrecht). From 2000 to 2020, the archbishop was Joris Vercammen, a former Roman Catholic who served on the central committee of the World Council of Churches. In 2020, Joris Vercammen was succeeded by Bernd Wallet.

== Beliefs ==
The Old Catholic churches reject the universal jurisdiction of the pope, as well as the Roman Catholic dogma of papal infallibility (1870), which was used to proclaim the Roman Catholic dogmas of the Assumption of Mary (1950). While Old Catholics affirm the Real Presence of Christ in the Eucharist, they do not emphasize transubstantiation as the sole dogmatic explanation for this presence. Old Catholics of Utrecht generally refrain from using the filioque in the Nicene Creed and also reject a dogmatic understanding of Purgatory; they also generally do recognize a purification by Christ's grace after death and include prayers for the dead in their liturgy and devotions. They maintain such basic western Catholic practices as baptism by affusion (pouring of water) and the use of unleavened bread in the Eucharist. Additionally, they have many aspects in common with the Orthodox, Lutheran and Anglican churches, such as optional clerical celibacy. Utrechter churches accept the doctrines of the Christian Church before the Great Schism of A.D. 1054.

=== Marriage ===
Some churches support blessings of same-sex marriage. These include the Old Catholic Church of the Netherlands since 2006, Catholic Diocese of the Old Catholics in Germany since 2021, Christian Catholic Church of Switzerland, and Old Catholic Church of Austria since 2022.

== See also ==
- Willibrord Society
