= Union of Scranton =

Old Catholic communion of churches

- Logo
- Classification: Old Catholic
- Governance: Episcopal
- Leader: Anthony Mikovsky
- Region: North America, Europe
- Origin: 2008
- Separated from: Union of Utrecht
- Official website: theunionofscranton.org

The Union of Scranton is a communion of Old Catholic churches established in 2008 by the Polish National Catholic Church (PNCC) of the United States, because the Union of Utrecht began ordaining women and blessing same-sex unions.

== Beliefs ==
The beliefs shared by Union of Scranton-member churches, distinguished from Roman Catholic and Union of Utrecht churches, are described in the Declaration of Scranton. The Declaration of Scranton expands Declaration of Utrecht principles by adding theologically conservative expressions of faith in the sacraments of marriage and holy orders.

In the Declaration of Scranton, the signatories:

- reject the dogma of papal infallibility and the universal episcopate of the Bishop of Rome
- reject the dogmatic pronouncements of the Immaculate Conception and the Assumption of Mary
- reject ordination of women to the priesthood, consecration of women to the episcopate and the blessing of same-sex unions
- affirm a sacrificial understanding of the Eucharist and the real presence.

== Members ==
- Polish National Catholic Church
- Nordic Catholic Church
  - Order of Port Royal (claim)
- (claimed, repudiated) Anglican Reformed Catholic Church

== Relationships ==
The Union of Scranton has been in dialogue with the Free Church of England since February 2013.
