= Żarki, Lesser Poland Voivodeship =

Żarki
- Village
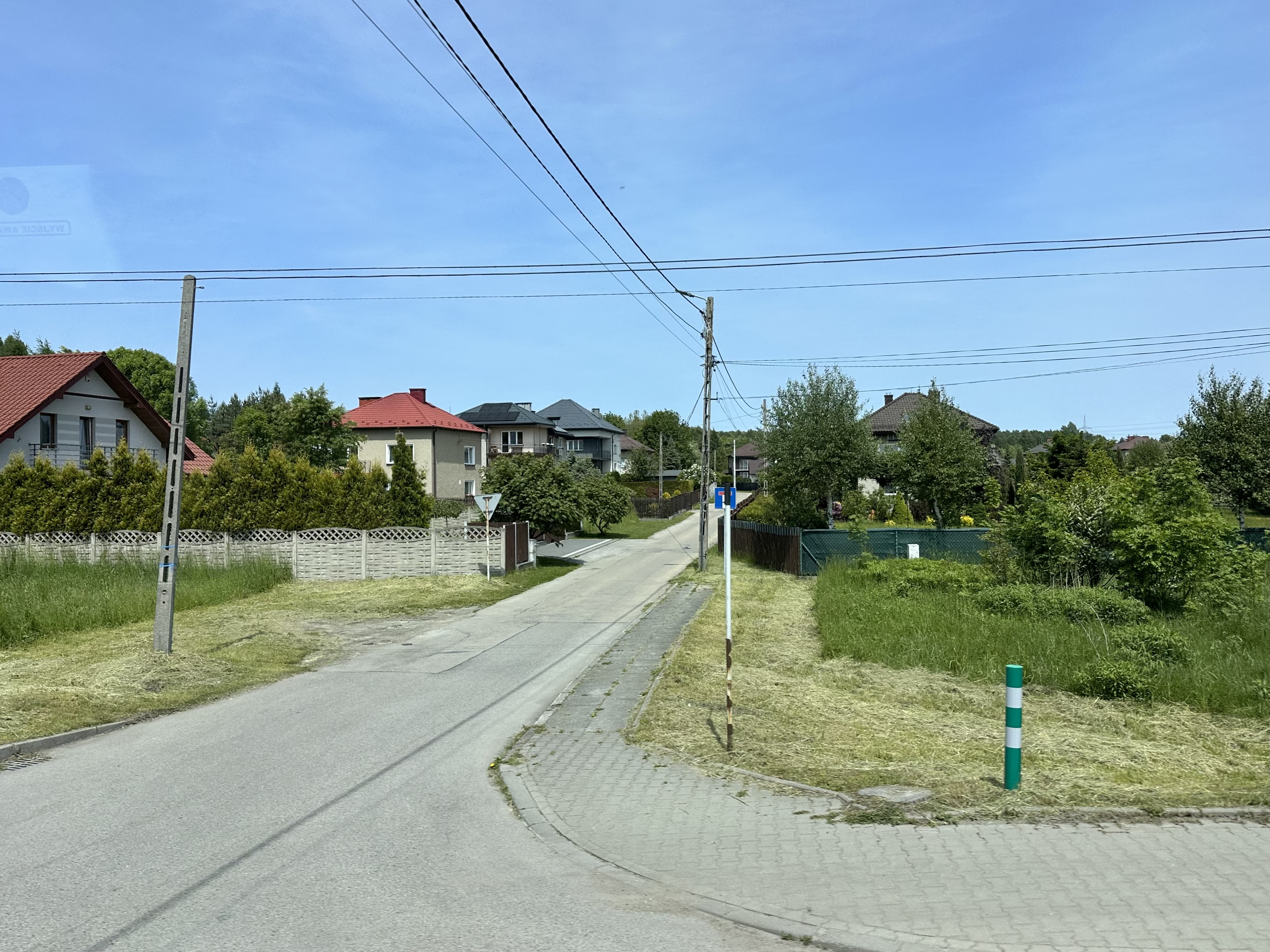

- Location within Poland
- Coordinates: 50°4′59″N 19°21′0″E
- Country: Poland
- Voivodeship: Lesser Poland
- County: Chrzanów
- Gmina: Libiąż
- Population: 3,500

Żarki [ˈʐarki] is a village in the administrative district of Gmina Libiąż, within Chrzanów County, Lesser Poland Voivodeship, in southern Poland.
