= Paul Sobiechowski =

American Catholic bishop (born 1954)

Paul Sobiechowski (born October 31, 1954) is the bishop of the Eastern Diocese of the Polish National Catholic Church. He was born in Detroit, Michigan and ordained a priest in 1979 after studying at the Savonarola Theological Seminary. He was consecrated to the episcopate on October 18, 2011.
