= Skupie, Siedlce County =

Skupie
- Village
- Location within Poland
- Coordinates: 52°18′N 22°6′E
- Country: Poland
- Voivodeship: Masovian
- County: Siedlce
- Gmina: Mokobody

Skupie [ˈskupjɛ] is a village in the administrative district of Gmina Mokobody, within Siedlce County, Masovian Voivodeship, in east-central Poland.
