= Anthony Rysz =

Anthony Michael Rysz (July 15, 1924 - March 20, 2015) was a bishop of the Eastern Diocese of Polish National Catholic Church. He was born in Old Forge, Lackawanna County, Pennsylvania and attended the University of Scranton and Savonarola Theological Seminary. He was ordained to the priesthood on October 19, 1950, and consecrated on June 26, 1968. Bishop Rysz was active in theological dialogue between the Roman Catholic Church and the Polish National Catholic Church. He was succeeded as bishop of the Central Diocese of the Polish National Catholic Church by Casimir J. Grotnik.

== Works ==
- Journeying Together in Christ: The Report of the Polish National Catholic-Roman Catholic Dialogue (1984-1989), edited by Stanislaus J. Brzana and Anthony M. Rysz. (Huntington, Indiana: Our Sunday Visitor Publishing Division, 1990). ISBN 9781592760381
