= Joseph Tomczyk =

American Catholic bishop

Joseph Peter Tomczyk (May 19, 1935 – October 4, 1995) was born in Wilkes-Barre, Pennsylvania. He was ordained to the priesthood on April 19, 1954, and consecrated bishop in Scranton, Pennsylvania on October 18, 1993. He served as the second diocesan Bishop of the Canadian Diocese of the Polish National Catholic Church until his death.
