= Robert M. Nemkovich =

Polish National Catholic primate

The Most Reverend Robert Nemkovich
- Prime Bishop of the Polish National Catholic Church
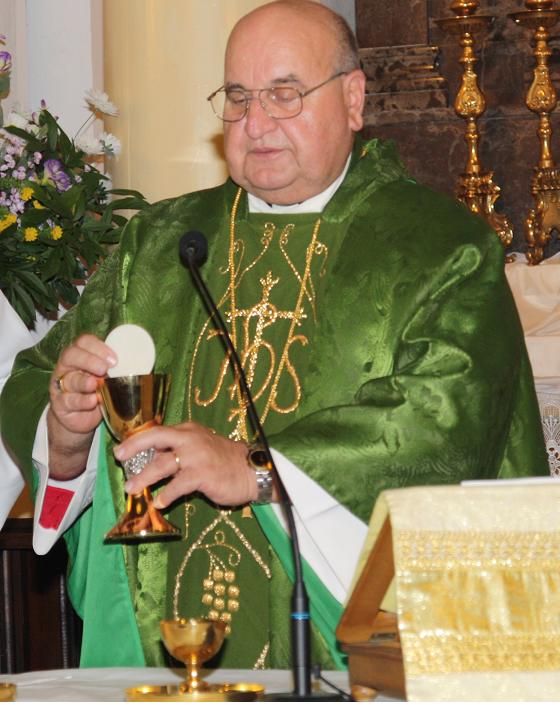
- Nemkovich in 2008
- Elected: 8 October 2002
- In office: 2002–2010
- Predecessor: John Swantek
- Successor: Anthony Mikovsky

Orders
- Ordination: 1966
- Consecration: 1993

Personal details
- Born: November 27, 1942 (age 83) Grove City, Pennsylvania, U.S.

Robert M. Nemkovich (born November 27, 1942) is an American prelate and was the sixth Prime Bishop of the Polish National Catholic Church, elected by the twenty-first General Synod of this denomination in 2002 and serving until 2010.

== Biography ==
Nemkovich was born in Grove City, Pennsylvania and grew up in Youngstown, Ohio. He graduated from North High School in 1960 and from Youngstown State University in 1964. He attended Savonarola Theological Seminary in Scranton, Pennsylvania and was ordained a priest in 1966. Before being elected Prime Bishop on 8 October, 2002, he served as Bishop of the church's western diocese from 1993 to 2002.

He lives in Chicago. His son, the Rev. Robert M. Nemkovich Jr., is also a priest.

Polish National Catholic Titles
Preceded by John F. Swantek	Prime Bishop; 2002–2010	Succeeded by Anthony Mikovsky
