= Central Diocese of the Polish National Catholic Church =

Coordinates: 41.3937°N 75.6696°W

Location
- Ecclesiastical province: Polish National Catholic Church

Statistics
- Parishes: 41

Information
- Cathedral: St. Stanislaus Bishop and Martyr Cathedral, Scranton

Current leadership
- Bishop: Bernard Nowicki

Website
- Central Diocese of the Polish National Catholic Church Official Website

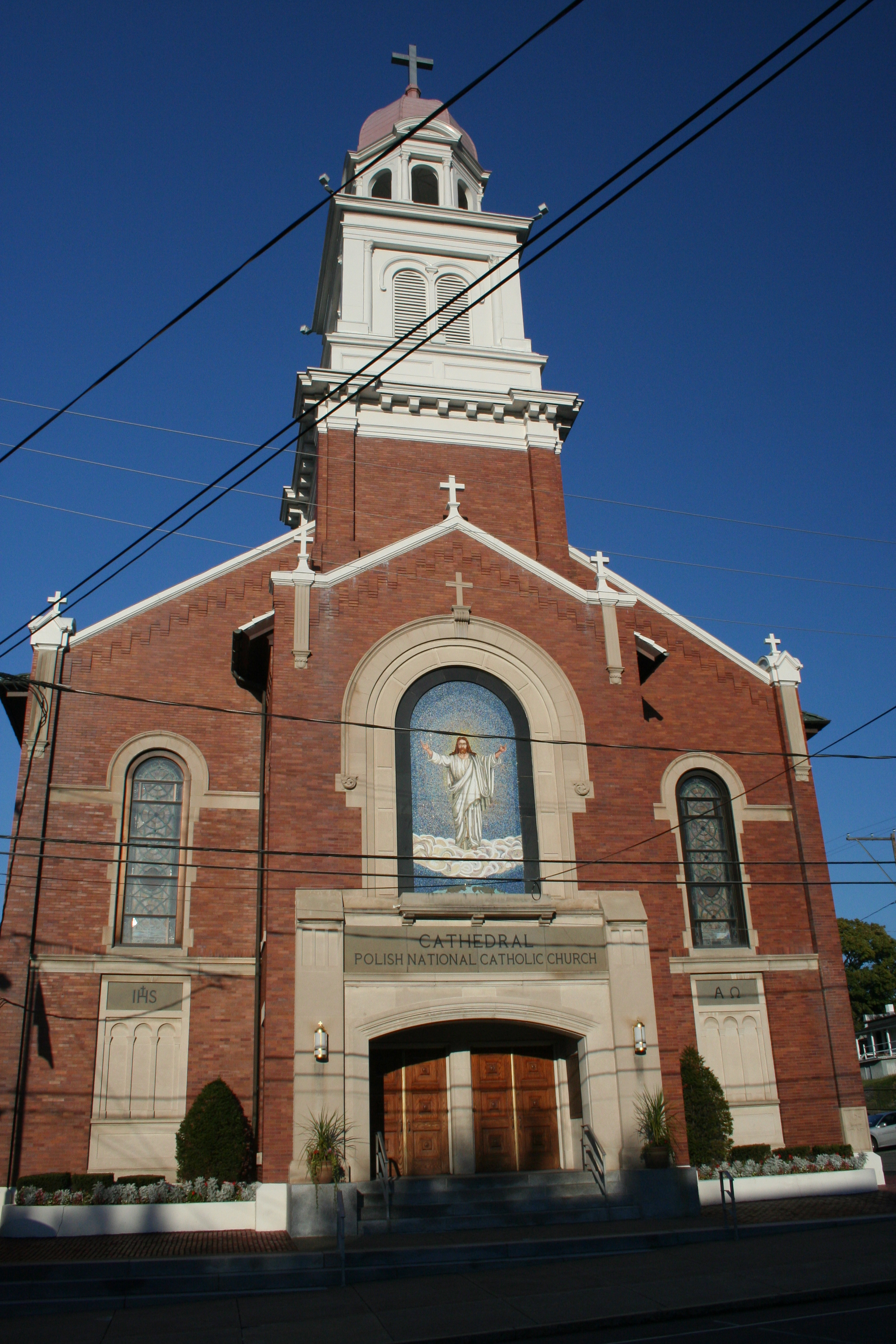
St. Stanislaus Bishop and Martyr Cathedral in Scranton, Pennsylvania

The Central Diocese of the Polish National Catholic Church is a diocese of the Polish National Catholic Church that includes New Jersey, part of New York, eastern Pennsylvania, and parishes in California, Colorado, and Maryland. The cathedral of the Central Diocese is St. Stanislaus Bishop and Martyr Cathedral in Scranton, Pennsylvania. The diocese comprises 41 parishes divided into five seniorates: Scranton, Plymouth, Philadelphia, New York/New Jersey, and Mohawk Valley. For each seniorate, there is appointed an Administrative Senior, who is a priest of the diocese charged with responsibilities throughout the area of the seniorate.

== Bishops ==
Bernard Nowicki is the current bishop ordinary of the Central Diocese, being consecrated on September 14, 2012. He succeeded John E. Mack, who returned to the Buffalo Pittsburgh Diocese where he had previously served as an auxiliary bishop. Mack was consecrated a bishop on November 30, 2006. Mack succeeded Anthony Mikovsky, who was elected the Prime Bishop of the Polish National Catholic Church at the General Synod held in October 2010. Mikovsky succeeded Casimir J. Grotnik as bishop of the Central Diocese. Grotnik died on December 9, 2005. Grotnik succeeded Anthony Rysz who retired at the age of 75. The constitution and laws of the Polish National Catholic Church provide for the mandatory retirement of bishops.
