= Francis Rowinski =

Polish National Catholic prelate (1918–1990)

The Most Reverend Francis Rowinski
- Prime Bishop of the Polish National Catholic Church
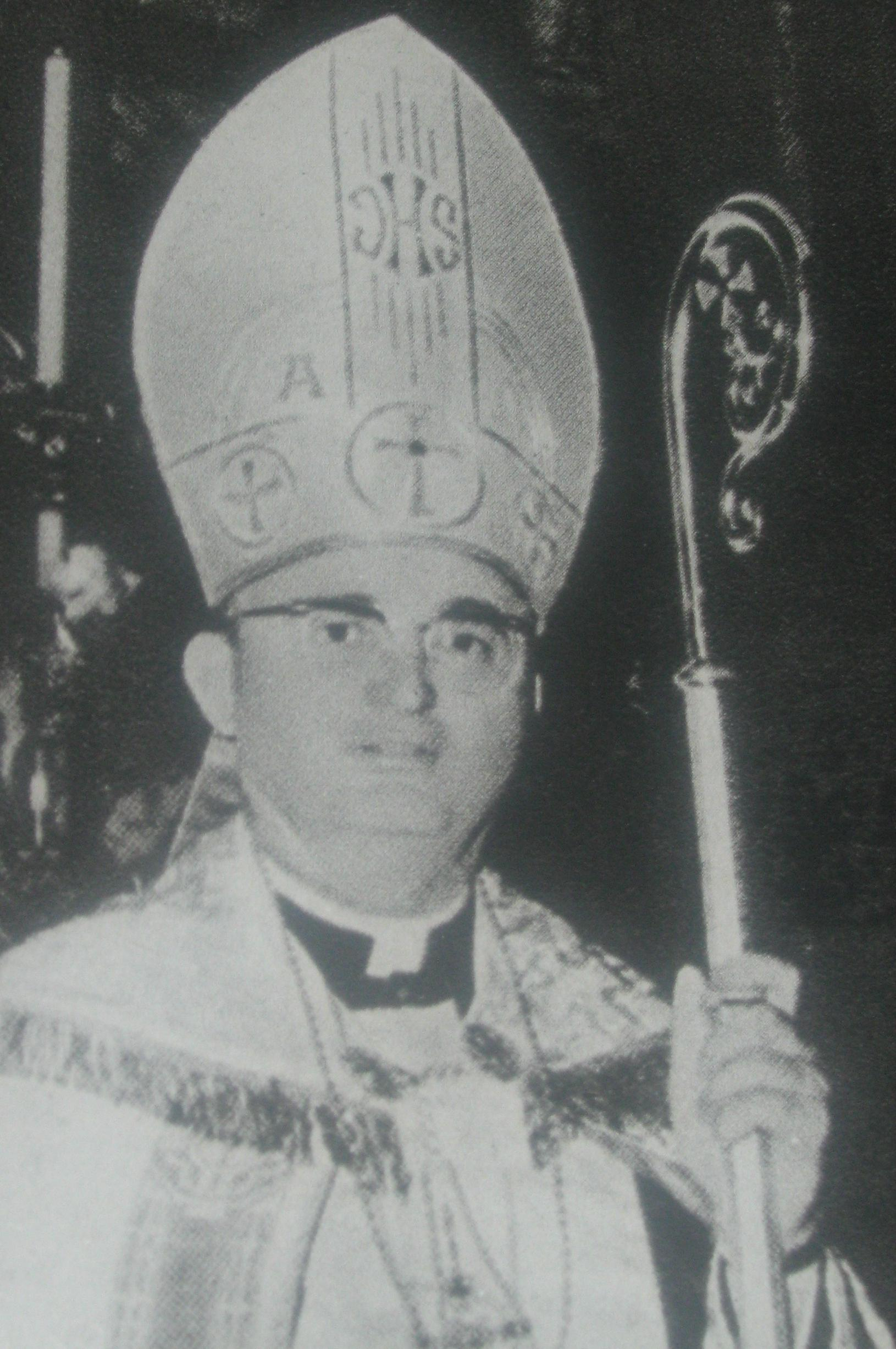
- Rowinski in 1977
- Predecessor: Thaddeus Zielinski
- Successor: John Swantek

Orders
- Ordination: May 17, 1939
- Consecration: May 9, 1959

Personal details
- Born: September 10, 1918; Dickson City, Pennsylvania, U.S.
- Died: August 4, 1990 (aged 71)

Francis Carl Rowinski (September 10, 1918 – August 4, 1990) was an American prelate and primate of the Polish National Catholic Church (PNCC). Born in Dickson City, Pennsylvania, Rowinski was ordained to the priesthood on May 17, 1939, consecrated bishop on May 9, 1959, and served as diocesan Bishop of the Western Diocese of the Polish National Catholic Church from 1959 to 1978, when he was appointed Prime Bishop of the PNCC. He was appointed Bishop Ordinary of the Buffalo-Pittsburgh Diocese of the PNCC on October 3, 1978, and retired in June, 1990.

Polish National Catholic Titles
Preceded by Thaddeus Zielinski	Prime Bishop; 1978–1985	Succeeded by John Swantek
