= Anthony Mikovsky =

American Polish National Catholic bishop (born 1966)

The Most Reverend Anthony Mikovsky
- Prime Bishop of the Polish National Catholic Church
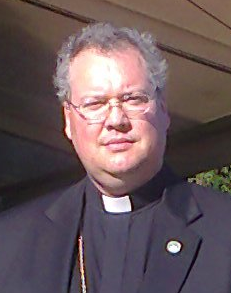
- Church: Polish National Catholic Church
- In office: 2010 present
- Predecessor: Robert M. Nemkovich
- Other post: Bishop of the Central Diocese of the Polish National Catholic Church

Orders
- Ordination: 1997
- Consecration: 2005 by Robert M. Nemkovich

Personal details
- Born: 6 January 1966 (age 60)

Anthony Mikovsky (born January 6, 1966) is an American Polish National Catholic bishop. He is Prime Bishop of the Polish National Catholic Church, having been elected at the General Synod of the church in October 2010 and his installation at 21 November 2010, at St. Stanislaus Cathedral, in South Scranton. Mikovsky was previously the bishop ordinary of the Central Diocese of the Polish National Catholic Church. Mikovsky holds a PhD in mathematics from the University of Pennsylvania.

== Ecclesiastical career ==
Mikovsky was ordained as a priest in 1997. He spent his priesthood of 13 years first as an assistant pastor, then as bishop ordinary of the Central Diocese of the Polish National Catholic Church in Scranton, from 2005 to 2011.

== Declaration of Scranton ==
In April 2008, Mikovsky was one of eight bishops who were signatories of the Declaration of Scranton. By this document, bishops of the Polish National Catholic Church expressed their rejection of certain dogmatic pronouncements of the Catholic Church, and also rejected the blessing of homosexual unions and the ordination of women to the priesthood. The Declaration of Scranton is an expansion upon the principles set forth in the Declaration of Utrecht, adding theologically conservative expressions of faith in the sacraments of marriage and holy orders.

Polish National Catholic Titles
Preceded by Casimir J. Grotnik	Bishop of the Central Diocese; 2005–2011	Succeeded by John Mack
Preceded by Robert M. Nemkovich	Prime Bishop; 2010–present	Incumbent
