= Leon Grochowski =

Polish National Catholic primate

The Most Reverend Leon Grochowski
- Prime Bishop of the Polish National Catholic Church
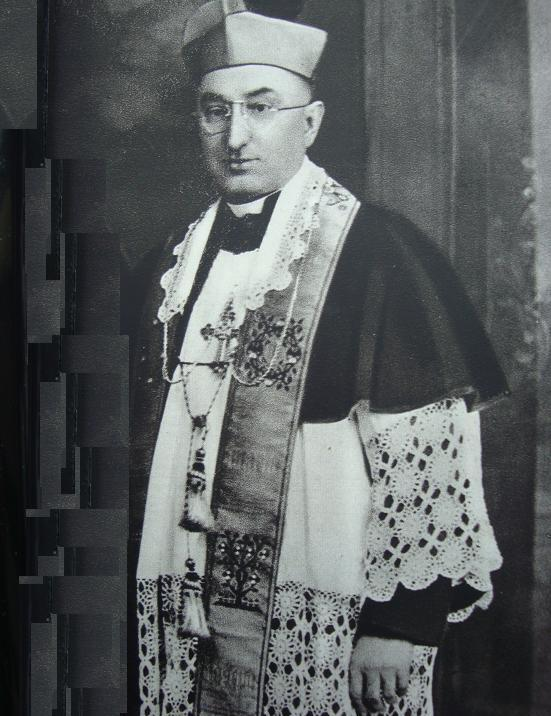
- Leon Grochowski in 1923
- Predecessor: Francis Hodur
- Successor: Thaddeus Zielinski

Orders
- Ordination: 1910
- Consecration: August 17, 1924 by Francis Hodur

Personal details
- Born: October 11, 1886 Skupie, Masovia, Poland
- Died: July 17, 1969 (aged 82) Warsaw, Poland
- Education: Savonarola Theological Seminary

Leon Grochowski (11 October 1886 – 17 July 1969) was the second Prime Bishop of the Polish National Catholic Church in the United States, Canada and Poland and early American radio evangelist.

Born in Skupie, Poland, he came to the United States in July 1905, on board the S/S Bremen which sailed from Bremerhaven, Germany, to the Port of Baltimore, Maryland. He became a United States citizen in 1923. Grochowski was a partisan freedom fighter during the last Czarist occupation of Poland, forcing him to flee Russian authorities. Upon reaching America he continued his studies in engineering which he started in Germany but became interested in the Polish National Catholic Church (PNCC) movement. Upon graduation from the PNCC Savonarola Theological Seminary, one of his first pastorships was St. Adalbert's Parish in Dickson City, Pennsylvania, where he led rebuilding efforts following an arson fire that destroyed the parish's original structure.

Grochowski was elected bishop on July 15, 1924, and was consecrated to the episcopate on August 17, 1924. He then served as bishop of the Western Diocese of the Polish National Catholic Church, based in Chicago, Illinois, for 30 years. During that time, he helped organize parishes throughout the Midwest and became an early radio evangelist. Hosting a radio hour on WGES Chicago for 25 years, Grochowski utilized a format now used by contemporary televangelists, broadcasting testimonials and hosting celebrities popular with the audience he was trying to reach. His radio hour is archived in the National Museum of Radio and Television, New York City and Los Angeles, California. With the expansion of the Western PNCC diocese, his tenure also saw the construction of All Saints Cathedral, begun in 1930 and completed in 1931. Constructed of limestone, it became known as the "white cathedral" which is clearly visible when overlooking Chicago's skyline.

Throughout the 1920s and 1930s, Grochowski also engaged in missionary work in Poland, helping to organize Polish National Catholic parishes there. During that time, he was awarded the Cross of Valor in 1932, Poland's highest honor to individuals who fought the Czarist occupation of Poland.

Grochowski also served as the third diocesan bishop of the Central Diocese of the Polish National Catholic Church. He became Prime Bishop of the PNCC upon the death of Franciszek Hodur in 1953. During that time Grochowski organized clothing and food aid programs to Poland in the aftermath of World War II, called the Good Samaritans. Because he showed no favoritism in the distribution of food and medical supplies, the communist regime in Poland eased its persecution of the PNCC Church. As a result, Grochowski also was awarded the Bojownikom Niepodleglosci, (Knight's Cross of the Order of Polonia Restituta), by the post-war government of Poland, the Polish People's Republic.

Grochowski's tenure as PNCC prime bishop in America also focused on the youth of the church which included overseeing the construction of St. Stanislaus Youth Center in the late 1960s in Scranton, Pennsylvania. After this, he was awarded the keys to the City of Scranton, Pennsylvania.

Grochowski died in Warsaw at age 82 while engaging in missionary work on July 17, 1969. His body is entombed in the "Monument of Gratitude" Mausoleum in St. Stanislaus Cathedral Cemetery, Scranton, Pennsylvania, where he rests with the PNCC's First Presiding Bishop, Bp. Hodur. He was succeeded by Bp. Thaddeus Zielinski, who said upon his death that he, "gave all his loyalty, love and labor for the church and his people," and that Grochowski believed that, "to serve people is to serve God. He gave his life for Jesus and the church."

Polish National Catholic Titles
Preceded by Office Established	Bishop Ordinary of the Western Diocese of the Polish National Catholic Church; 1926 – 1955	Succeeded by Joseph Kardas
Preceded by Francis Hodur	Prime Bishop; 1953-1969	Succeeded by Thaddeus Zielinski
Preceded by John Misiaszek	Bishop Ordinary of the Central Diocese of the Polish National Catholic Church; November 1954 – July 17, 1969	Succeeded by Anthony Rysz
