= Francis Hodur =

Bishop primate and founder of the Polish National Catholic Church

The Most Reverend Francis Hodur
- Prime Bishop of the PNCC
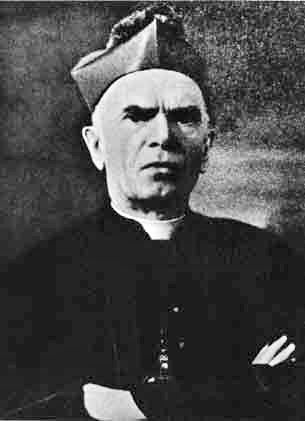
- A 1907 portrait of Hodur
- Native name: Franciszek Hodur
- Successor: Leon Grochowski

Orders
- Ordination: August 19, 1893 by William O'Hara of the Roman Catholic Church
- Consecration: September 29, 1907 by Gerardus Gul of the Old Catholic Church

Personal details
- Born: April 1, 1866 Żarki, Gmina Libiąż, Poland
- Died: February 16, 1953 (aged 86) Scranton, Pennsylvania, United States
- Education: Jagiellonian University

Bishop Franciszek "Francis" Hodur (1 April 1866 – 16 February 1953) was the founder and first Prime Bishop of the Polish National Catholic Church (PNCC). Ordained by the Roman Catholic church in 1893, Hodur served two parishes in the Scranton diocese before he was excommunicated five years later in 1898 for his release of a National Church program, which called for reformation to canon laws of temporal goods. His excommunication was also a result of his rejection of the dogmas of papal infallibility and supremacy after the Council of Trent. With a congregation of approximately 200 families, he founded the St. Stanislaus Parish in Scranton, Pennsylvania and celebrated Mass in the Polish vernacular of the congregation, instead of Latin, as was common in the Roman Catholic church. Hodur was consecrated a bishop in 1907 with apostolic succession by the bishops of Old Catholic Church and went on to expand the episcopate of the PNCC to manage diocesan affairs and ordain priests therein. Under Hodur, the church expanded to 245 parishes across the United States and Poland. After his death in 1953, he was succeeded by Leon Growchowski, whom he had consecrated in 1924.

== Early life and priesthood ==
Hodur was born on Easter Sunday, April 1, 1866, to Jan and Maria Hodur in the village of Żarki, 35 miles from Kraków, Poland. He enrolled as a seminarian in Kraków and studied at Jagiellonian University. He left Europe in December 1892 for the United States of America, where he hoped to serve Polish immigrants. Hodur made his way to the Diocese of Scranton, Pennsylvania, and was sent to the seminary at St. Vincent's Benedictine Archabbey in Latrobe. On August 19, 1893, he was ordained a priest in the Roman Catholic Church by Bishop William O'Hara.

== Break with Rome ==
When issues of contention arose between Polish Catholic immigrants in Scranton, Nanticoke, Wilkes-Barre, Plymouth, Duryea, and Dickson City, and their Irish-American bishop Michael Hoban, Hodur traveled to Rome in January 1898 to seek redress from the Holy See but was unsuccessful, being excommunicated by Pope Leo XIII. Returning to the United States, he met with the parishioners that he had represented and made known his decision not to remain under the jurisdiction of the Roman Catholic Church.

== Episcopate ==
Hodur was consecrated a bishop on September 29, 1907, by Gerardus Gul, the Old Catholic Archbishop of Utrecht, the Netherlands, assisted by Bishop Jan Van Thiel of Haarlem and Bishop Peter Spitz of Deventer. He then served as the first Prime Bishop of the Polish National Catholic Church and consecrated other bishops, ensuring the maintenance of apostolic succession.

He died in Scranton. His funeral was attended by the Presiding Bishop of the Episcopal Church, Charles L. Street, suffragan Bishop of the Episcopal Diocese of Chicago, and Bishop Frederick J. Warnecke of the Episcopal Diocese of Bethlehem, along with other prominent Episcopal Church leaders. He was succeeded as Prime Bishop by Leon Grochowski.

Polish National Catholic Titles
Preceded by Office Established	Prime Bishop; 1907-1953	Succeeded by Leon Grochowski
Preceded by Office Established	Bishop Ordinary of the Central Diocese of the Polish National Catholic Church; 1907 – 1949	Succeeded by John Misiaszek
