= Polish National Catholic Church =

Independent Old Catholic denomination

- Logo
- Classification: Christian
- Orientation: Old Catholic
- Theology: Ultrajectine
- Polity: Episcopal
- Prime Bishop: Anthony Mikovsky
- Associations: Union of Scranton; National Council of Churches; World Council of Churches
- Region: United States, Canada
- Founder: Franciszek Hodur
- Origin: March 1897; Scranton, Pennsylvania, USA
- Separated from: Catholic Church
- Branched from: Union of Utrecht
- Separations: Polish-Catholic Church in the Republic of Poland
- Congregations: 128
- Members: 30,000
- Official website: https://pncc.org/

The Polish National Catholic Church (PNCC; Polish: Polski Narodowy Kościół Katolicki, PNKK) is an independent Old Catholic church based in the United States and founded by Polish Americans that is part of the Union of Scranton.

The PNCC is not in communion with the Catholic Church. Since 2004, the PNCC is no longer in communion with the Union of Utrecht.

The church has around 30,000 members in five dioceses in the United States and Canada with 119 congregations in the US. The church is part of Polish Old Catholicism.

== History ==
Hymn of the PNCC
Through the Years
written by Francis Hodur c. 1921

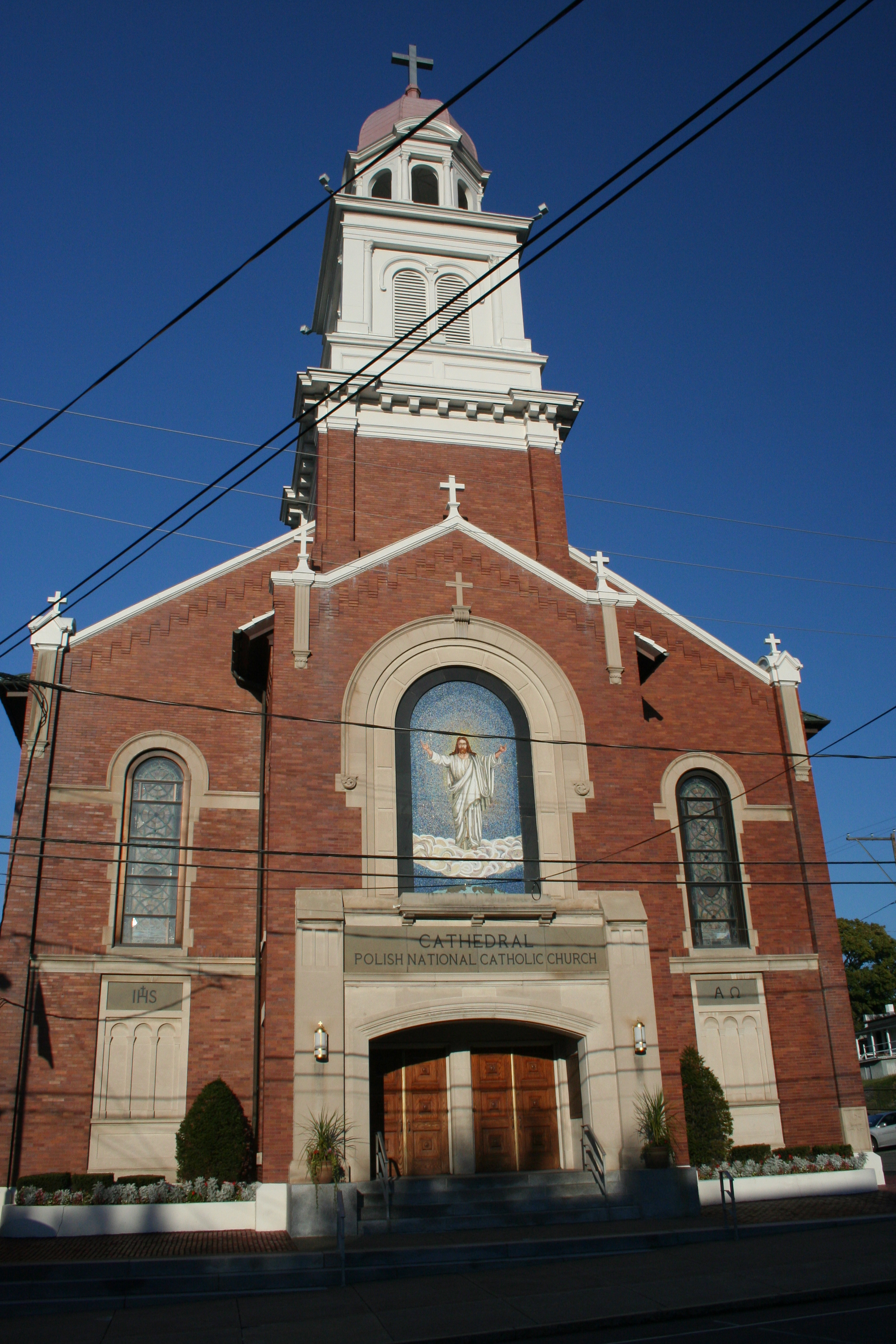
St Stanislaus Cathedral in Scranton, Pennsylvania

During the late 19th century, many Polish immigrants to the U.S. became dismayed with the hierarchy of the Catholic Church. The U.S. church had no Polish bishops and few Polish priests, and would not allow the Polish language to be taught in parish schools. The mainly ethnic Irish and German bishops helped establish hundreds of parishes for Poles, but priests were usually unable to speak Polish, and the new immigrants had poor or limited English. There were also disputes over who owned church property, particularly in Buffalo, New York, and Scranton, Pennsylvania, with the parishioners demanding greater control. Although the majority of Polish-Americans remained with the Catholic Church, where bilingual Polish-American priests and bishops were eventually ordained, many Polish-Americans in the meantime came to believe that these conditions were a manifestation of "political and social exploitation of the Polish people".

A leader in this struggle was Fr. Franciszek Hodur (1866–1953), a Polish immigrant to the United States and a Catholic priest. Born near Kraków, he immigrated to the U.S. in 1893 and was ordained that year; in 1897, he became pastor of St. Stanislaus Cathedral in Scranton. Continued discontent led to an open rupture with the U.S. Catholic Church in 1897, when Polish immigrants founded an independent Polish body, headquartered in Scranton, with initially some 20,000 members. Fr. Hodur was consecrated as a bishop in 1907 in Utrecht, Netherlands, by three Old Catholic bishops. The PNCC considers him to be the founder and first bishop of the denomination.

The church began missionary work in Poland after the country regained independence following World War I. By the beginning of World War II, the PNCC had founded more than 50 parishes along with a theological seminary in Kraków. During post-war Communist rule of Poland, the church suffered severe persecution. The Polish Catholic Church is now an autocephalous body in communion with the PNCC.

In 2002, Robert M. Nemkovich was elected by the twenty-first general synod to be the sixth prime bishop of the Polish National Catholic Church.

In 2010, Anthony Mikovsky was elected by the twenty-third general synod to be the seventh prime bishop of the Polish National Catholic Church. Bishop Mikovsky has been bishop of the Central Diocese and pastor of St. Stanislaus Cathedral since 2006. Before becoming a bishop, he served as the assistant pastor at St. Stanislaus, the mother church of the denomination, beginning in 1997.

== Beliefs ==
=== Marriage and divorce ===
The church believes that "Marriage is the sacrament which makes a Christian man and woman husband and wife, gives them grace to be faithful to each other and to bring up their children in love and devotion to God." Unlike in the Catholic Church, PNCC deacons are not permitted to officiate at weddings. The PNCC permits divorced people to participate fully in the Mass and to receive the Eucharist. The church does not recognize civil divorce and requires an annulment before parishioners can remarry.

Since 1921, the PNCC has permitted bishops and priests to marry.

=== Governance ===
The PNCC is governed in accordance with its Constitution and Laws.

The chief legislative body is a general synod, which normally convenes every four years. The composition of the PNCC General Synod includes clergy and laity. Each parish is entitled to send one lay delegate for each 50 active members. While its constitution and canon laws provide that the PNCC General Synod holds the authority to remove bishops, the Prime Bishop purported to remove the bishop of the Polish National Catholic Church of Canada in January 2013.

== Ecumenical relationships ==
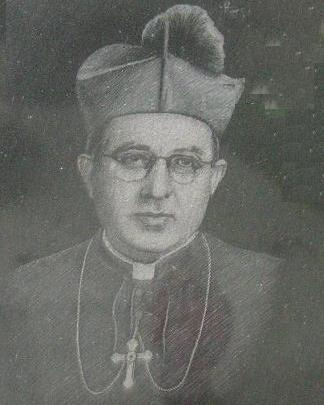
Bishop Józef Padewski

The PNCC is a member of the National Council of Churches and the World Council of Churches.

In the 1970s the PNCC's relationship with the Utrecht Union grew strained as there was a gradual shift towards what was regarded as liberalism in the rest of Utrecht Union churches while the PNCC was becoming more conservative. The PNCC in the United States and Canada entered into a state of "impaired communion" with the Utrecht Union in 1997, since the PNCC did not accept the validity of ordaining women to the priesthood, which most other Utrecht Union churches had been doing for several years. The PNCC continued to refuse full communion with those churches that ordained women; thus, in 2003 the International Old Catholic Bishops' Conference expelled the PNCC from the Utrecht Union, determining that "full communion, as determined in the statute of the IBC, could not be restored and that therefore, as a consequence, the separation of our Churches follows".

Dialogue with the United States Conference of Catholic Bishops, with the approval of the Holy See, led in 1996 to an arrangement that Laurence J. Orzell has called "limited inter-communion". What this means is that the Catholic Church recognizes the validity of the sacraments of the PNCC, and allows members of the Latin Church and Eastern Catholic Churches in particular exceptional circumstances, defined in canon 844 of the 1983 Code of Canon Law of the Latin Church and the parallel canon 671 of the Code of Canons of the Eastern Churches, that are regulated by the diocesan bishop or conference of bishops, to receive three sacraments from PNCC ministers. Canon 844 allows those Catholics who can avoid error and indifferentism and are unable to approach a Catholic minister to receive, under certain conditions, the sacraments of Reconciliation, Eucharist, and Anointing of the Sick from "non-Catholic ministers, ministers in whose churches these sacraments are valid". This canon declares it licit for Catholic priests to administer the same three sacraments to members of churches which the Holy See judges to be in the same condition in regard to the sacraments as the Eastern churches, if they ask for the sacraments of their own accord and are properly disposed. Obstacles to full communion include different understandings about papal primacy, the level of involvement of the laity in church governance, and the PNCC reception of some former Catholic clergy, most of whom subsequently married.

The PNCC has been also in ecumenical dialogue since 2018 with numerous jurisdictions from the continuing Anglican movement: the Anglican Catholic Church, the Anglican Province of America, and the Anglican Church in America—commonly referred to as the G-3. Progress has been steady, and the potential for full communion is on the horizon and nearing quickly.

== List of prime bishops ==
#	Tenure	Portrait	Name	Place of birth
1	1904–1953		Bishop Franciszek Hodur	Zarki, Poland, Austrian Empire
2	1953–1968		Bishop Leon Grochowski	Skupie, Poland, Russian Empire
3	1968–1978		Bishop Thaddeus Zielinski	Wilkes-Barre, Pennsylvania, United States
4	1978–1985		Bishop Francis Rowiński	Dickson City, Pennsylvania, United States
5	1985–2002		Bishop John Swantek	Wallingford, Connecticut, United States
6	2002–2010		Bishop Robert Nemkovich	Grove City, Pennsylvania, United States
7	2010–present		Bishop Anthony Mikovsky	Trenton, New Jersey, United States

== See also ==
- Central Diocese of the Polish National Catholic Church
- List of the Bishops of the Polish National Catholic Church
- St. John's Cathedral (Toronto)
- Union of Scranton
