= Orthodox Catholic Church =

Orthodox Catholic Church or Orthodox Catholic may refer to:

- The Catholic Church
  - The Eastern Catholic Churches, particularly the Greek Catholic Churches
- The Eastern Orthodox Church
- The Oriental Orthodox Churches
- The Orthodox-Catholic Church of America
- The Catholicate of the West, also called The Western Orthodox Catholic Church

== See also ==
- Catholic (disambiguation)
- Catholic (term)
- Orthodox (disambiguation)
- Church (disambiguation)
- Catholic Church (disambiguation)
- Orthodox Church (disambiguation)
- Orthodoxy
- Catholicity
