= Western Catholic (disambiguation) =

Western Catholic may refer to:

- The Latin Church, the sole particular church sui juris of the Catholic Church considered part of Western Christianity
  - The Holy See, head see of the Catholic Church

== See also ==
- Catholic (disambiguation)
- Catholic Church (disambiguation)
- Catholic (term)
- Roman Catholic Church (disambiguation)
- Roman Catholic (term)
