= History of the Orthodox Church =

History of the Orthodox Church may refer to:

- History of the Eastern Orthodox Church
- History of Oriental Orthodoxy

== See also ==
- Orthodox (disambiguation)
- Orthodox Church (disambiguation)
