= Anti-Orthodox =

The term anti-orthodox may refer to criticism or animosity towards any orthodox notion (religious, political, ideological, cultural, artistic):

- Heterodoxy specifically refers to any opinions or doctrines which are at variance with an official or orthodox position in religious or non-religious usage

The capitalized term anti-Orthodox may also refer to:

- Persecution of Eastern Orthodox Christians, negative sentiments and animosities towards Eastern Orthodox Christianity
- History of Oriental Orthodoxy § Persecution of Oriental Orthodoxy, negative sentiments and animosities towards Oriental Orthodox Christianity
- Criticism of Judaism § Criticism of traditional Judaism by Reform movement
- Anti-Sunnism

== See also ==
- Orthodox (disambiguation)
- Unorthodox (disambiguation)
