= Slava (tradition) =

Traditional celebration found mainly among Serb Orthodox Christians

Slava Слава
- Official name: Krsna slava
- Observed by: Serbian Orthodox Christians
- Significance: Veneration of the family's patron saint
- Observances: Church services, family and other social gatherings
- Date: According to Orthodox calendar
- Duration: 1–3 days
- Frequency: annual
Slava, celebration of family saint patron's day
- UNESCO Intangible Cultural Heritage
- Country: Serbia
- Reference: 01010
- Region: Europe and North America
Inscription history
- Inscription: 2014 (9th session)
- List: Representative

Slava (Serbian: Слава, lit. 'Celebration', Serbian pronunciation: [ˈslâʋa]) is an old tradition among Serbian Orthodox Christians (Serbs) involving the social gathering of one's family for the feast day of its patron saint. It is an annual ritual ceremony where the family's saint–guardian, passed down patrilineally through the generations, is venerated on a specific date according to the Orthodox calendar. The celebration connects Christian and folklore tradition and varies from stricter church rules to a family holiday centered on hosting for guests. The ritual items include a specific bread, candle, koljivo, red wine, and incense. It is one of the most important traditions and an ethnic and national marker, being practiced by all Serbs. The custom was inscribed on UNESCO Intangible Cultural Heritage Lists in 2014.

== Overview ==
The custom, known as krsna slava ("baptismal celebration") or simply slava, is described as a folk-religious tradition (narodno-crkveni praznik) of the Serbs. It is one of the most important traditions among the Serbs. The tradition is an important ethnic marker of Serb identity, and is practiced by ethnic Serbs both in the Balkans and in the diaspora communities; the folk saying Gde je slava, tu je Srbin (Где је слава, ту је Србин, lit. 'Where there is a Slava, there is a Serb') portrays the collective character that the tradition has. The custom, or similar ones, were in the past celebrated among portions of other Balkan peoples.

The slava is different from the name days and birthdays, as it focuses on the family and not the individual.

== History ==
=== Origin ===
There are various theories on the origin of elements in the slava, such as Antique Greek, Roman, ancestor cult, and Christianization of the South Slavs when patron saints were chosen based on the day of baptism. Scholars have pointed out similarity of the custom to the Greek hero cult, supported also by the word for wheat, koljivo, derived from Greek kolivon. Others have pointed to connections to the Roman hero-ancestor cult and the "breaking of bread". Another popular interpretation is that of Slavic mythical ancestors and cult of the dead, with sacrificial offering such as wheat and wine. In any case, a pre-Christian custom and a Christian ceremony merged into one through Archbishop Sava (1174–1235) and became what is today the krsna slava.

The tradition has been traced back to the baptism of Serbs in the 9th century, when ancestors adopted patron saints whose life was an example to follow and who would represent them before the Lord and interpret their prayers, and to thank God for the good bestowed upon their family, to celebrate once a year. The family or clan adopted the feast day based on the day they were baptized. Still, the ancient custom of sacrificial offering was not eradicated at the time, as the missionary activity had partial initial success among the recently polytheistic South Slavs. Many offered sacrifices to their Christian patron saints, as done before to the various Gods, and for instance, cattle were brought to church and slaughtered, and their meat used for feast. It was only the activity of Archbishop Sava and his disciples (and establishment of the autocephalous Serbian Church) that became the last stage in the final Christianization of the Serb people, manifested through the removal of remnants of polytheism among the people. The previous sacrifice was forbidden, as well as the organization of feasts at churches when not in the manner of memorial celebration of saints in which only offering of earthly fruits for blessing was befitting. Thus, Sava's Church had the decisive significance in creating the slava, as it is celebrated today, as a result of its activity against idolatry. 13th–14th-century manuscripts indicate the merging of folk customs and religious feast into one. The folk-religious custom was thus created within Serbian Orthodox Christianity in the beginning of the 13th century. The Nemanjić dynasty adopted Stephen the Protomartyr as the protector of the Serbian state, and all their rulers since Stefan Nemanjić (r. 1196–1228) wore the name Stefan alongside their folk name (i.e. Stefan Uroš, Stefan Milutin, Stefan Dušan).

=== Modern history ===
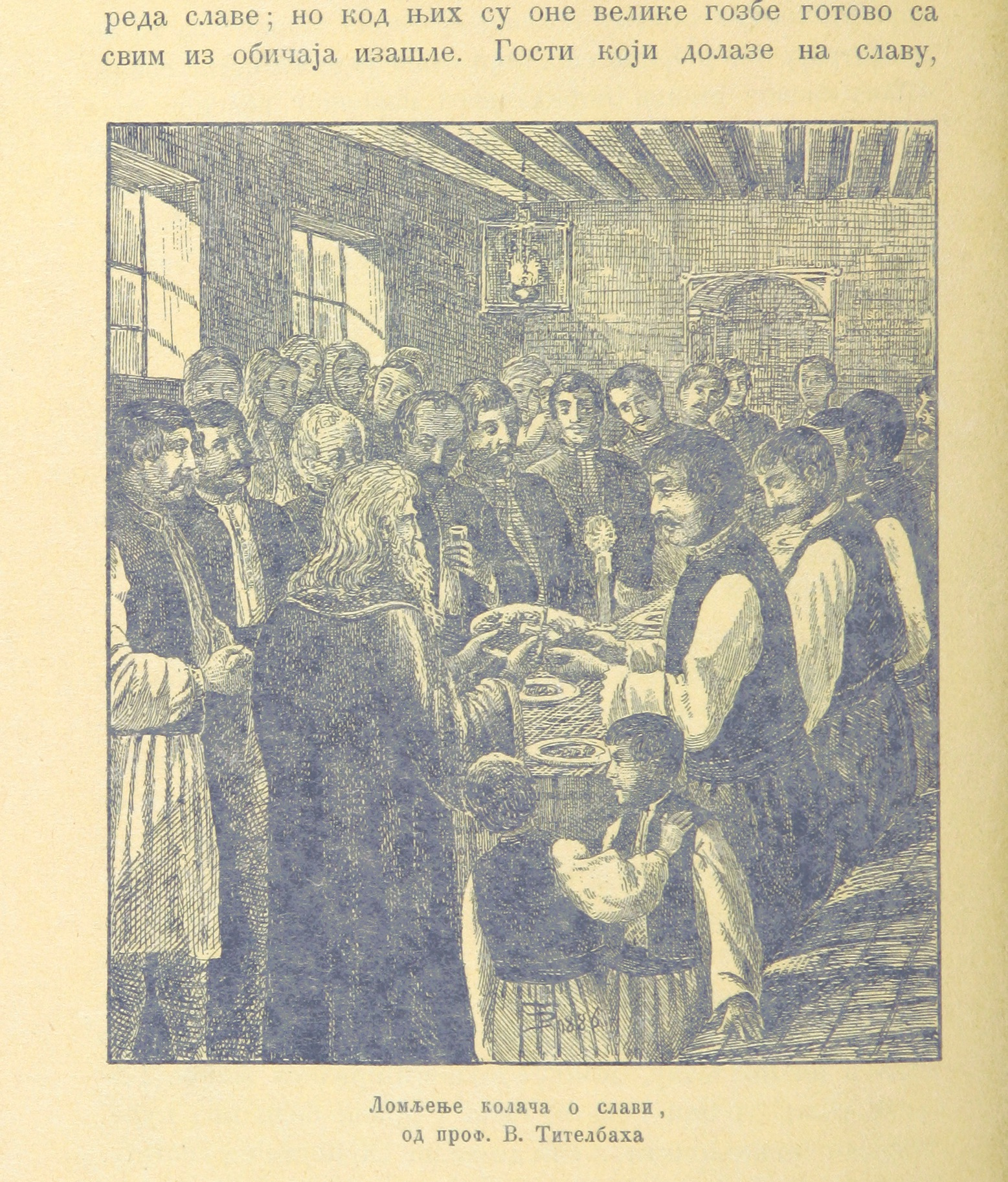
"Breaking" of the slavski kolač, illustration by Vladislav Titelbah, 1877

There were restrictions and bans on the slava, particularly on the Serbs under Venetian and Habsburg rule, either justified rationally by excessive consumption or as a means of Uniatization and conversion from Orthodoxy to Catholicism. By special Habsburg imperial decrees (1770, 1779), 56 Orthodox holidays were abolished and the duration of remaining ones (including the slava) was reduced to one day. The Republic of Venice sought to Catholicize the Serbs, and used the restrictions on the slava as a tool. In 1772, the Venetian government forbade families in the Bay of Kotor to house guests during their slava. Despite Venetian restrictions, Alberto Fortis recorded the slava (Italian: al Santo Protettore della famiglia) among the Morlachs in the Dalmatian hinterland in his 1774 work. The Austrian government tried to ban the slava in its territories in 1830 through bishop Rajačić. The custom has helped preserve Serbian national identity and ethnicity in times of foreign occupations.

Russian diplomat I. Yastrebov (1839–1894) commented on the slava among the Serbs in Old Serbia (Kosovo and Macedonia) at the end of the 19th century as "For a Serb, there is no more important holiday than the day of their designated patron saint—their protector. Even the poorest Serb prepares for that day with special care and devotion, and celebrates it solemnly".

In the years following World War II, during the Communist-Socialist rule, some families put sheets over their windows as to hide that they celebrated slava. The Socialist era (1945–1987) promoted atheism and members of the Communist party were unable to take time off on the day of slava. The post-Communist transition to democracy became intertwined with religious renewal and nationalist awakening; religion became a primary identity marker for many, and the Serbian Orthodox Church profiled itself as the spiritual and moral authority. Religious holidays, including slava, re-gained prominence.

In November 2014 it was inscribed in the UNESCO Intangible Cultural Heritage Lists of Serbia.

In a 2024 study of 100 families in 36 locales celebrating the slava, 97% responded they celebrated it at home; 64% that they celebrated it for one day; 84% responded they still celebrated it during the COVID pandemic.

== Customs ==
=== The family and patron saint ===
The Slava is a family's annual ceremony and veneration of their patron saint, as a church is dedicated to a saint, also, the Serb family is dedicated to a saint who protects the family, and is a mediator of God's grace and facilitates the connection to Christ and God. There is a parallel between the church and the family, in that both are dedicated to saints, the slava being in line with liturgical celebration as Paul the Apostle's "the church in their house". It is celebrated as per the Orthodox calendar. The patron saint is passed down from father to son (patrilineal), each generation. Upon marriage, women typically adopt the patron saint of their spouse although it is not uncommon for them to continue celebrating their native family's saint as well (in which case the secondary one is known as preslava). If the husband moves to the estate of his wife, he continues the slava of that family; if he brought property, the wife's slava is celebrated as preslava (a more modest feast). There were also customs in some regions of adopting yet another slava upon buying a house or becoming an adoptee.

The ritual feast is dedicated religiously to God and the saint, and for "the good health of the living" and "general remembrance of the souls of the departed family members". The custom is helpful in genealogical studies as an indicator in kinship relations between families. Historically, in some Serb regions, the families that shared a saint were taken to be relatives and thus a boy and girl that had the same slava were to avoid marriage. Generally, even atheists know their family's slava.

There are a total of 67 saints venerated in the slava among Serbs. Around 150 days in the calendar are dedicated to patron saints who are celebrated in slava. The majority of slava fall in autumn and winter, which meant they were timed with the Serbs' traditional agrarian and livestock-rearing rhythm. Only three feast days among the slava are on movable dates, all of the rest are on specific dates. The most common feast days are St. Nicholas (Nikoljdan, 19 December), St. George (Đurđevdan, 6 May), St. John the Baptist (Jovanjdan, 20 January), St. Demetrius (Mitrovdan, 8 November), St. Michael (Aranđelovdan, 21 November) and St. Sava (Savindan, 27 January). Dates given are according to the Gregorian calendar. The Serbian Orthodox Church uses the Julian calendar.

=== Rituals and food ===
The feast is usually celebrated 1–3 days. The celebration varies from stricter church rules to a family holiday centered on hosting for guests.

The ritual items include the Slavski kolač (ritual bread, also called krsni kolač and krsna česnica), Slava candle (sveća), koljivo (boiled wheat, sweetened and sometimes mixed with chopped walnuts, also called žito), red wine, and incense. All the ritual objects are known since the Old Testament. Traditionally, in the villages, the local priest visited the households on the feast day and blessed them with "blessed water" and prayers (a ritual called nositi vodicu), and the woman of the house used this blessed water to knead the ritual bread. When a priest is involved in the feast, the priest surrounded by family members blesses the house prior to the slava, in front of the saint's icon and the lit candle whereby the priest recites a prayer. Every room in the house is then sprinkled with holy water along with the members of the family who are each named and wished good health.

Ritual holding of the Slavski kolač.

The main feature of the celebration is the ritual cutting or breaking of the Slavski kolač ("Slava cake, bread"), a round leavened (yeast) wheat bread, made especially for this occasion. The bread is variously decorated on the top, most commonly with the Greek-language acronym ICXC, but also with the Serbian cross, peace dove, and other symbols. The breaking of bread, which involves cutting the cross into the bread and turning it in a circle, is accompanied by blessings, a song, and the ceremonial drinking of red wine or Rakija. The bread, koljivo and wine is consecrated at church or at home. Relatives and the closest friends are invited to the feast, and any stranger present that day would be welcomed as a guest. The guests are first treated with a spoon of koljivo, and a drink of wine or Rakija. The rituals, including welcoming, exchanging slava greetings, censing, breaking bread, singing slava songs, drinking wine, toasting, addressing the guests, are each accompanied with cheek kissing three times.

Depending on the liturgical day, the meals are either according to fasting (posna) or non-fasting (mrsna); during fasting (such as the most popular feast day of St. Nicholas), the meals contain no animal products, such as meat, milk, eggs, etc., except for fish and seafood (pesco-vegan). The order of serving is typically in three main parts, firstly ritual refreshments (water, sugar, rakija and coffee), then meze (pickling, aspic, koljivo, cheese), and finally the main course (cooked dishes such as stuffed peppers, sarma rolls, meatballs, or goulash, concluding with roasted meat or fish and gibanica pie). Pastries are served at the end, and alongside wine, nowadays beer and soft drinks are introduced. After the meals and ritual greetings with wine, the feast turns into a party with songs, some times with live music.

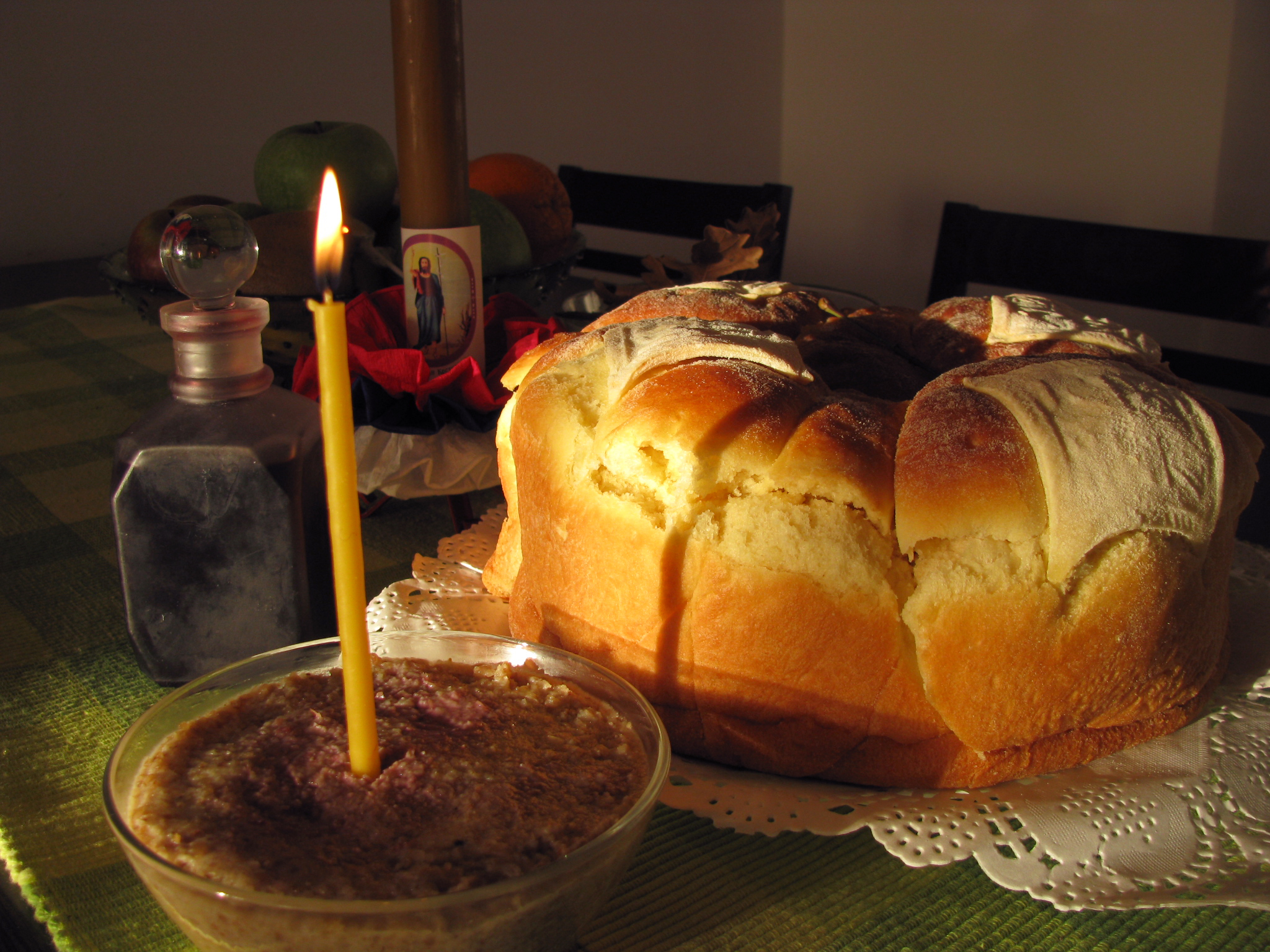
Slavski kolač, koljivo, and candle, prepared for John the Baptist's feast day

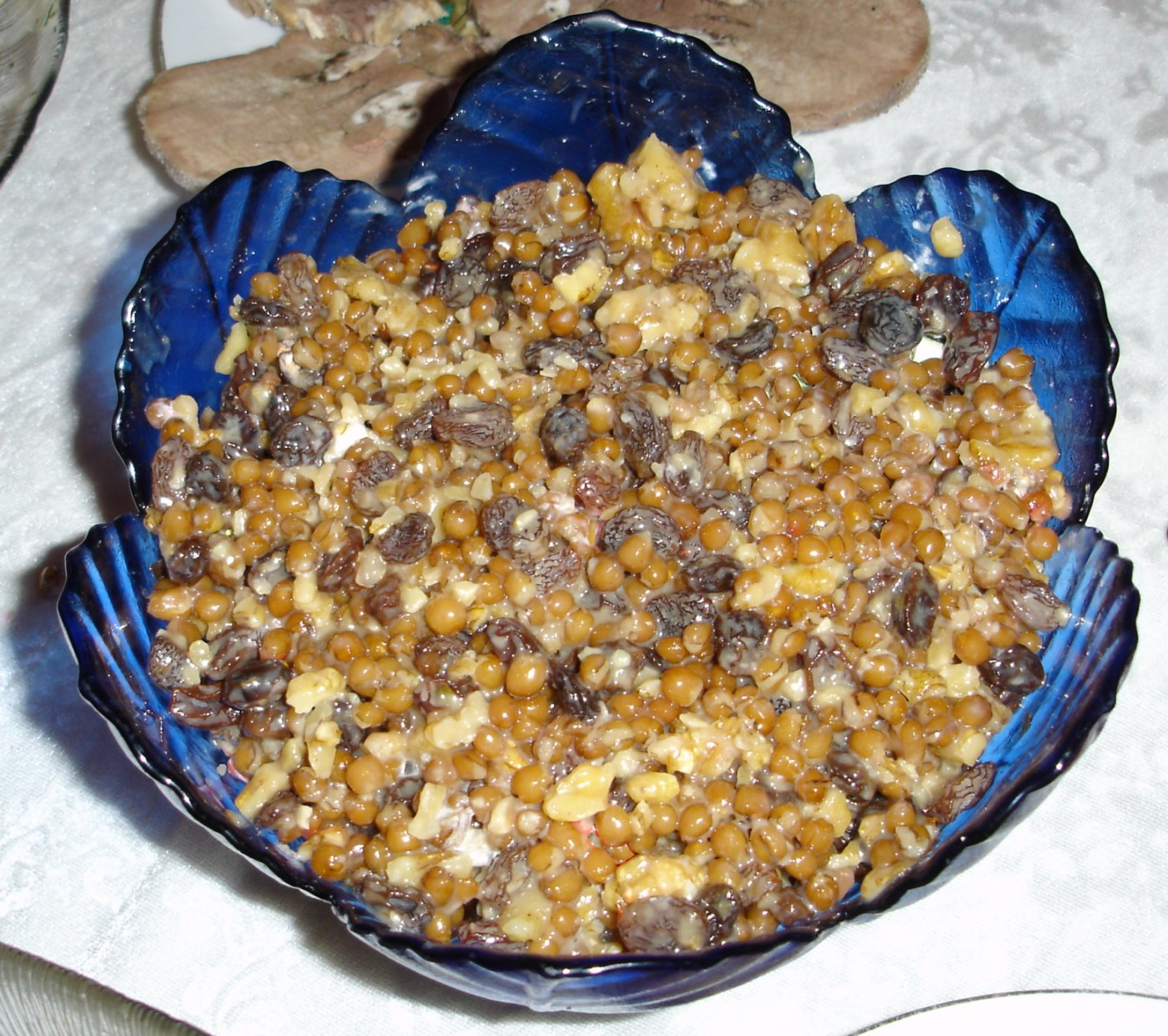
Koljivo, ritual meal

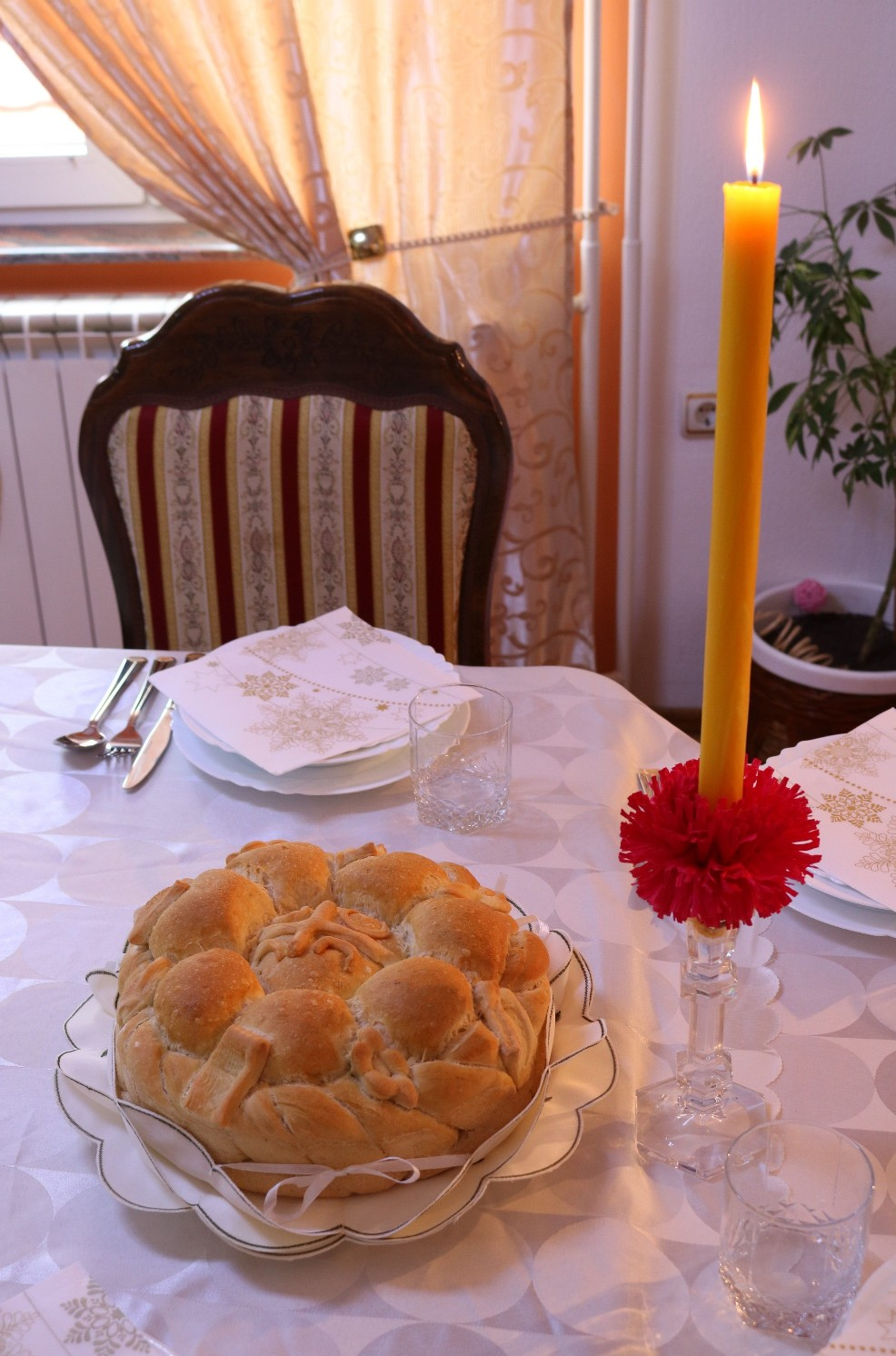
Slavski kolač and candle

== Legacy ==
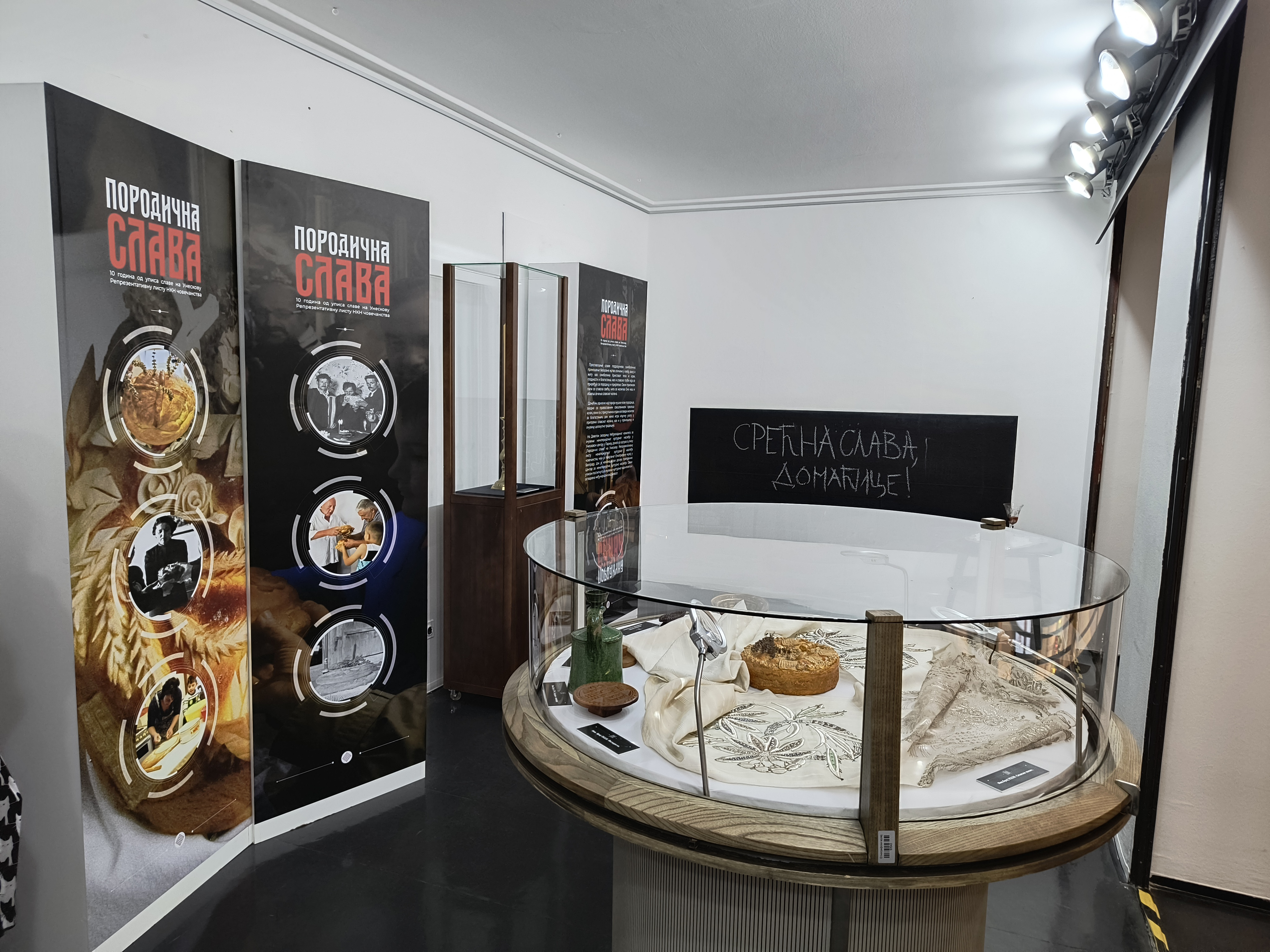
Thematic exhibition about slava, Ethnographic Museum in Belgrade

The tradition is recorded in Serbian epic poetry. There are many poems dedicated to the custom, such as Српска слава; Ко крсно име слави, оном и помаже; Како се крсно име служи; Турци не даду пити у славу Божију; Вјера наша, вјера стара. Vuk Karadžić wrote on the slava in his 1818 and 1852 editions of Srpski rječnik. Due to its importance among Serbs, many works and studies have been published on the subject in the last 150 years. The works of 20 influential scholars were included into a zbornik radova (collection of scientific papers), edited by I. Kovačević in Krsno ime (1985). M. Nedeljković published a large monograph, Slava u Srba, in 1991. As of 2015, there were 15 scientific monographs on the slava. On the 10th anniversary of the UNESCO inscription, the Ethnographic Museum in Belgrade held a conference dedicated to the slava on 27 November 2024.

=== Slava outside the family ===
Breaking of bread in front of an icon, during village slava in Krupac near Pirot.

Apart from the family feast day, there is also the village slava (seoska slava) or zavetina, also called crkvena slava ("church celebration") when a religious procession accompanies it. The village and church slava usually fall on the same day, and the procession (litija) features people led by a priest with church banners around the village and visiting the sacred trees (zapis) where a religious service is held. In 1855, Montenegrin prince Danilo forbade the village feast as it tended to economically exhaust the people ("it is enough that we celebrate our Serb tradition [slava]"). Today, there is also the city slava which celebrates the city's saint–guardian.

In the second half of the 18th century, the Serbian Church in the Habsburg monarchy established the school slava of Saint Sava, then introduced in Serbia in 1827 or 1840, and this evolved into a holiday cherishing the language, Cyrillic script, and Enlightenment, which is today celebrated in Serbian schools. The guild/profession slava (such as, of doctors and seamen) was celebrated among industrial- and craft associations in the 19th century until World War II, and was then returned in the 1990s. In the aftermath of World War II, due to severe restrictions on religion, "Socialist slava" were created and organized by local authorities, usually according to the day the settlement was liberated, of rituals characteristic of the zavetina. Some social organizations, sport associations, professional societies and companies have adopted a kind of slava with main elements, involving their members, guests, and a priest. In Serbian Banat, there is also the celebration of the livestock slava and children's slava.

== See also ==
- Koliada
- Patronal feast day
- Dušni Brav
- National symbols of Serbia

== Annotations ==
1. The tradition is mostly known as slava ("celebration") and krsna slava (Крсна слава), krsna meaning "baptismal". It is also known as krsno ime (Крсно име, "Christened name"), svetac, sveti ("saint"), sveto ("holy"), služba ("service"), and other less common variations. The variant krsna slava is a modern combination of krsno ime and slava. The oldest recorded name is pomen svetom ("commemoration of the saint") and dates to a 13th-century Old Serbian manuscript dedicated to the clergy. The most popular variant, slava, is recorded in the verb slaviti in 1704.
2. The Catholic bishop of Bosnia, Augustin Miletić, claimed in 1818 that the custom was banned, although without sources or who ordered this. The folklorist Stjepan Banović claimed in 1912 that there were families in 21 villages near Makarska that celebrated the slava. M. Filipović claimed there were still Catholics in parts of Lepenica in central Bosnia and Herzegovina that celebrated the slava in the mid-20th century. J. Trifunovski recorded the slava in villages in the Ohrid–Struga region in North Macedonia in 1977–78, and pointed out that the Bulgarian Church was unable to eradicate the custom during its occupation in the wars.
3. There was also the adoption, in some parts in Slavonia, of yet another slava of the previous owner of a bought house to be celebrated along with the family's. In the Leskovac area, the adoptee promised to celebrate his adoptive father's slava upon his death.

== Sources ==
- Bakić-Hayden, Milica (2018). "The Cross at the Crossroads". In Montgomery, David W. (ed.). Everyday Life in the Balkans. Indiana University Press. pp. 290–292. ISBN 978-0-25303-820-3.
- Barišić, Milina Ivanović (2016). "Culture and Identity: Slava, a family saint day among the Serbs". Култура [Culture]. 6 (14): 99–106.
- Kovač, Senka; Velimirović, Danijela (2024). "Породична слава у трећој деценији XXI века: трансформације друштвених интеракција током празничног времена [Family Patron Saint's Day in the Third Decade of the XXI Century: Тhe Transformation of Social Interactions During the Festive Season]". Слава породице: десет година од уписа породичне славе на Унескову Репрезентативну листу нематеријалног културног наслеђа човечанства. pp. 13–42. ISBN 978-86-7891-162-0.
- Pavković, Nikola F. (2015). "Слава или Крсно име код Срба" [The Slava or Patron Saint's Day among the Serbs]. Glasnik Etnografskog instituta SANU. 63 (1): 123–145.
- Radenković, Ljubinko R. (2013). "„Слава" – породични празник Срба" [Slava: The Serb family feast]. Zbornik Matice srpske za slavistiku. 84. Novi Sad: Matica srpska: 9–23. ISSN 0352-5007.
- Todorović, Ivica R. (2024). "Начини идентитетске одбране–слава и литије". Социолошки преглед. 58 (4): 895–919.
- Vojinović, Hrizostom (2001) [1963]. Српска слава или крсно име. Православни мисионар; Јанус.
