= Boethius =

Roman senator and philosopher (480–524 AD)

Saint Boethius
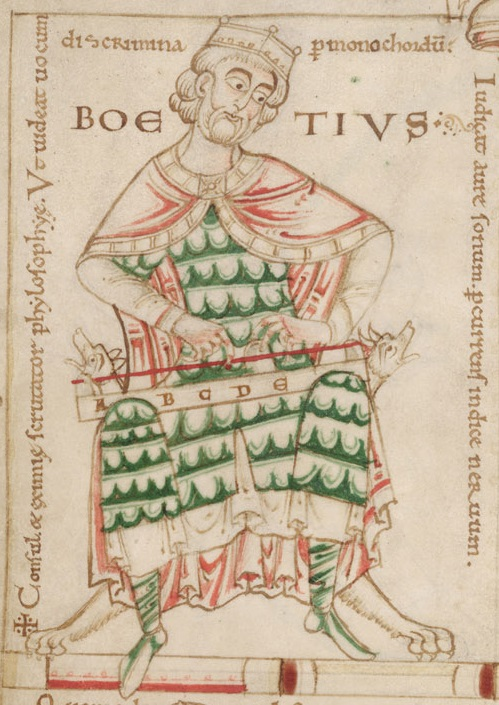
- Medieval illustration of Boethius

Martyr
- Born: Anicius Manlius Severinus Boethius c. 480; Rome, Kingdom of Odoacer
- Died: 524 (aged 43–44); Pavia, Ostrogothic Kingdom
- Venerated in: Catholic Church
- Major shrine: San Pietro in Ciel d'Oro, Pavia
- Feast: 23 October
- Patronage: Diocese of Pavia

Philosophical work
- Era: Medieval philosophy
- Region: Western philosophy
- School: Neoplatonism
- Main interests: Fate; epistemology; theology; music; mathematics
- Notable works: On the Consolation of Philosophy
- Notable ideas: Wheel of Fortune; Quadrivium; Recovery of Aristotle; Classical revival; Problem of universals; Principle of individuation; Medieval music theory; Square of opposition; Medieval syllogism; Mode (music); Porphyrian tree; Medieval dialectic

Anicius Manlius Severinus Boethius, (Note: The name Anicius demonstrated his connection with a noble family of the Lower Empire, while Manlius claims lineage from the Manlii Torquati of the Republic. The name Severinus was given to him in honour of Severinus of Noricum. In some parts of Italy, he is revered as Saint Severinus rather than as Boethius.) commonly known simply as Boethius (/boʊˈiːθiəs/; Latin: Boetius; c. 480 – 524 AD), was a Roman senator, consul, magister officiorum, polymath, historian, and philosopher of the Early Middle Ages. He was a central figure in the translation of the Greek classics into Latin, a precursor to the Scholastic movement, and, along with Cassiodorus, one of the two leading Christian scholars of the 6th century. The local cult of Boethius in the Diocese of Pavia was sanctioned by the Sacred Congregation of Rites in 1883, confirming the diocese's custom of honoring him on 23 October.

Boethius was born in Rome a few years after the forced abdication of the last Western Roman emperor, Romulus Augustulus. A member of the Anicii family, he was orphaned following the family's sudden decline and was raised by Quintus Aurelius Memmius Symmachus, a later consul. After mastering both Latin and Greek in his youth, Boethius rose to prominence as a statesman during the Ostrogothic Kingdom, becoming a senator by age 25, a consul by age 33, and later chosen as a personal advisor to Theodoric the Great.

In seeking to reconcile the teachings of Plato and Aristotle with Christian theology, Boethius sought to translate the entirety of the Greek classics for Western scholars. He published numerous transcriptions and commentaries of the works of Nicomachus, Porphyry, and Cicero, among others, and wrote extensively on matters concerning music, mathematics, and theology. Though his translations were unfinished following an untimely death, it is largely due to them that the works of Aristotle survived into the Renaissance.

Despite his successes as a senior official, Boethius became deeply unpopular among other members of the Ostrogothic court for denouncing the extensive corruption prevalent among other members of government. After publicly defending fellow consul Caecina Albinus from charges of conspiracy, he was imprisoned by Theodoric around the year 523. While jailed Boethius wrote On the Consolation of Philosophy, a philosophical treatise on fortune, death, and other issues which became one of the most influential and widely reproduced works of the Early Middle Ages. He was tortured and executed in 524, becoming a martyr in the Christian faith by tradition. (Note: Historian Johannes Fried points out that no proof ever emerged that Boethius had committed a crime despite being sentenced to death by Theodoric and the Ostrogothic Senate. Theodoric, who Fried states was guilty of misjudgment, likely regretted his actions. Procopius and later historians take a similar view, believing that he had been unjustly condemned.) (Note: Two years later, in 526, Boethius's adoptive father, Symmachus, was also put to death.)

== Early life ==
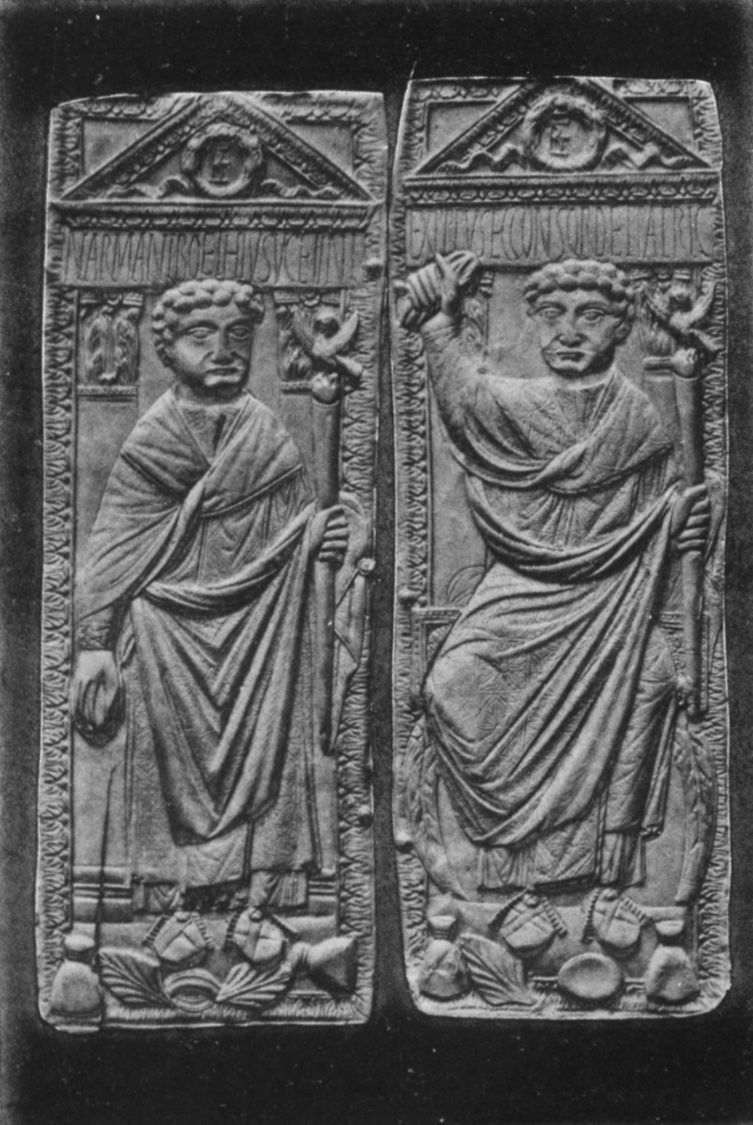
Consular diptych depicting Narius Manlius Boethius, Boethius's birth father

Boethius was born in Rome to a patrician family c. 480, but the exact date of his birth is unknown. His birth family, the Anicii, was a notably wealthy and influential gens that included emperors Petronius Maximus and Olybrius, in addition to many consuls. However, in the years prior to Boethius's birth, the family had lost much of its influence. The grandfather of Boethius, a senator by the same name, was appointed as praetorian prefect of Italy but died in 454 during the palace plot against Flavius Aetius. Boethius's father, Manlius Boethius, who was appointed consul in 487, died while Boethius was still young. Quintus Aurelius Memmius Symmachus, another patrician, adopted and raised him instead, introducing to him philosophy and literature. As a sign of their good relationship, Boethius would later marry his foster-father's daughter, Rusticiana, with whom he would have two children also named Symmachus and Boethius.

Having been adopted into the wealthy Symmachi family, Boethius had access to tutors that would have educated him during his youth. Though Symmachus had some fluency in Greek, Boethius achieved a mastery of the language—an increasingly rare skill in the Western regions of the Empire—and dedicated his early career to translating the entire works of Plato and Aristotle, with some of the translations that he produced being the only surviving transcriptions of Greek texts into the Middle Ages. The unusual fluency of Boethius in the Greek language has led some scholars to believe that he was educated in the East; a traditional view, first proposed by Edward Gibbon, is that Boethius studied in Athens for eighteen years based on the letters of Cassiodorus, though this was likely to have been a misreading by past historians. (Note: Historian Helen M. Barrett writes that the notion of Boethius having studied in Athens "must be rejected as without foundation", as it likely came from a misunderstanding of Cassiodorus's letters.)

Historian Pierre Courcelle has argued that Boethius studied at Alexandria with the Neoplatonist philosopher Ammonius Hermiae. However, Historian John Moorhead observes that the evidence supporting Boethius having studied in Alexandria is "not as strong as it may appear", adding that he may have been able to acquire his formidable learning without travelling. Whatever the case, Boethius's fluency in Greek proved useful throughout his life in translating the classic works of Greek thinkers, though his interests spanned across a variety of fields including music, mathematics, astrology, and theology.

== Rise to power ==
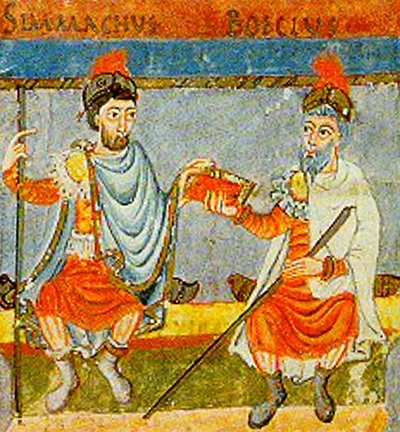
Boethius (right) and his adoptive father, Symmachus (left); both had been appointed consuls in their own right.

Taking inspiration from Plato's Republic, Boethius left his scholarly pursuits to enter the service of Theodoric the Great. The two had first met in the year 500 when Theodoric traveled to Rome to stay for six months. Though no record survives detailing the early relationship between Theodoric and Boethius, it is clear that the Ostrogothic king viewed him favorably. In the next few years, Boethius rapidly ascended through the ranks of government, becoming a senator by age 25 and a consul by the year 510. His earliest documented acts on behalf of the Ostrogothic ruler were to investigate allegations that the paymaster of Theodoric's bodyguards had debased the coins of their pay, to produce a waterclock for Theodoric to give to king Gundobad of the Burgundians, and to recruit a lyre-player to perform for Clovis, King of the Franks.

Boethius writes in the Consolation that, despite his own successes, he believed that his greatest achievement came when both his sons were selected by Theodoric to be consuls in 522, with each representing the whole of the Roman Empire. The appointment of his sons was an exceptional honor, not only since it made conspicuous Theodoric's favor for Boethius, but also because the Byzantine emperor Justin I had forfeited his own nomination as a sign of goodwill, thus also endorsing Boethius's sons. In the same year as the appointment of his sons, Boethius was elevated to the position of magister officiorum, becoming the head of all government and palace affairs. Recalling the event, he wrote that he was sitting "between the two consuls as if it were a military triumph, [letting my] largesse fulfill the wildest expectations of the people packed in their seats around [me]."

Boethius's struggles came within a year of his appointment as magister officiorum: in seeking to mend the rampant corruption present in the Roman Court, he writes of having to thwart the conspiracies of Triguilla, the steward of the royal house; of confronting the Gothic minister, Cunigast, who went to "devour the substance of the poor"; and of having to use the authority of the king to stop a shipment of food from Campania which, if carried, would have exacerbated an ongoing famine in the region. These actions made Boethius an increasingly unpopular figure among court officials, though he remained in Theodoric's favor.

== Downfall and death ==
The young philosopher Boethius, a man whose varied accomplishments adorned the middle period of the reign of Theodoric, and whose tragic death was to bring sadness over its close.

— Thomas Hodgkin, Theodoric the Goth

In 520, Boethius was working to revitalize the relationship between the Roman See and the Constantinopolitan See—though the two were then still a part of the same Church, disagreements had begun to emerge between them. This may have set in place a course of events that would lead to loss of royal favour. Five hundred years later, this disagreement led to the East–West Schism in 1054, in which communion between the Catholic Church and Eastern Orthodox Church was broken.

In 523, Boethius fell from power. After a period of imprisonment in Pavia for what was deemed a treasonable offence, he was executed in 524. The primary sources are in general agreement over the facts of what happened. At a meeting of the Royal Council in Verona, the referendarius, Cyprianus, accused the ex-consul Caecina Decius Faustus Albinus of treasonous correspondence with Justin I. Boethius leapt to his defense, crying, "The charge of Cyprianus is false, but if Albinus did that, so also have I and the whole senate with one accord done it; it is false, my Lord King".

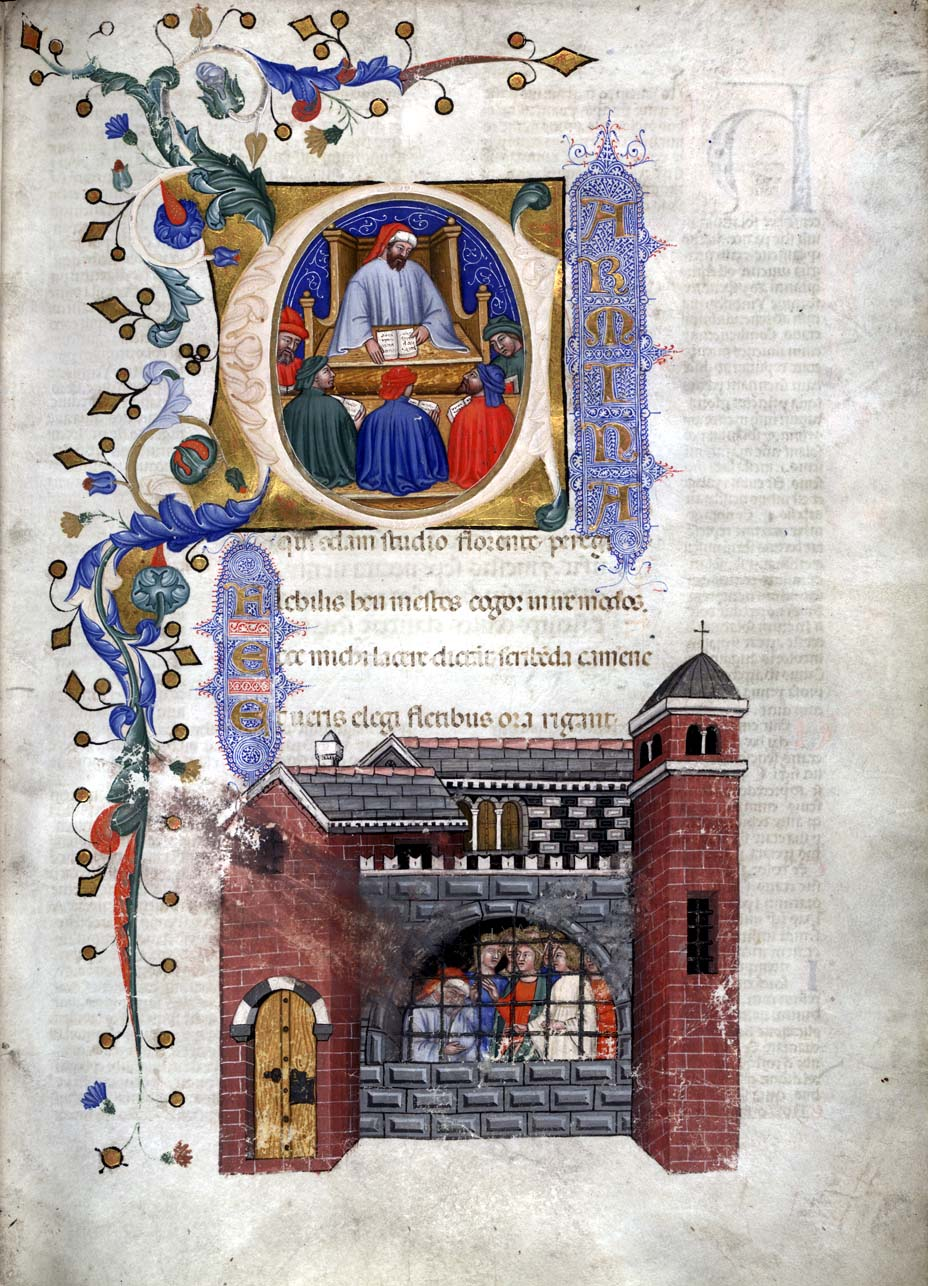
Manuscript depicting Boethius teaching students (initial) and while imprisoned

Cyprianus then also accused Boethius of the same crime and produced three men who claimed they had witnessed the crime. Boethius and Basilius were arrested. First the pair were detained in the baptistery of a church, then Boethius was exiled to the Ager Calventianus, a distant country estate, where he was put to death. Not long afterwards Theodoric had Boethius's father-in-law Symmachus put to death, according to Procopius, on the grounds that he and Boethius together were planning a revolution, and confiscated their property. "The basic facts in the case are not in dispute", writes Jeffrey Richards. "What is disputed about this sequence of events is the interpretation that should be put on them." Boethius claims his crime was seeking "the safety of the Senate". He describes the three witnesses against him as dishonorable: Basilius had been dismissed from Royal service for his debts, while Venantius Opilio and Gaudentius had been exiled for fraud. Other sources depict these men in a far more positive light. Cassiodorus describes Cyprianus and Opilio as "utterly scrupulous, just and loyal" and mentions they are brothers and grandsons of the consul Opilio.

Theodoric was feeling threatened by international events. The Acacian schism had been resolved, and the Nicene Christian aristocrats of his kingdom were seeking to renew their ties with Constantinople. The Catholic Hilderic had become king of the Vandals and had put Theodoric's sister Amalafrida to death and Arians in the East were being persecuted. Then there was the matter that with his previous ties to Theodahad, Boethius apparently found himself on the wrong side in the succession dispute following the untimely death of Eutharic, Theodoric's announced heir.

Boethius, the most learned man of his time, met his death in the hangman's noose...and yet the life of Boethius was a triumph! The West owes this individual, Anicius Manlius Severinus Boethius, nothing less than its progression toward a culture of reason.

— Johannes Fried, The Middle Ages

The method of Boethius's execution varies in the sources. He may have been beheaded, clubbed to death, or hanged. It is likely that he was tortured with a rope that was constricted around his head, bludgeoned until his eyes bulged out; then his skull was cracked. Following an agonizing death, his remains were entombed in the church of San Pietro in Ciel d'Oro in Pavia, also the resting place of Augustine of Hippo. His wealth was confiscated and his wife, Rusticiana, reduced to poverty.

Past historians have had a hard time accepting a sincere Christian who was also a serious Hellenist. These worries have largely stemmed from the lack of any mention of Jesus in Boethius's Consolation, nor of any other Christian figure. Arnaldo Momigliano argues that "Boethius turned to paganism. His Christianity collapsed—it collapsed so thoroughly that perhaps he did not even notice its disappearance." Many scholars have taken a different view, with Arthur Herman writing that Boethius was "unshakably Orthodox Catholic" and Thomas Hodgkin having asserted that uncovered manuscripts "prove beyond a doubt that Boethius was a Christian". The community that he was a part of valued equally both classical and Christian culture.

== Major works ==
=== De consolatione philosophiae ===
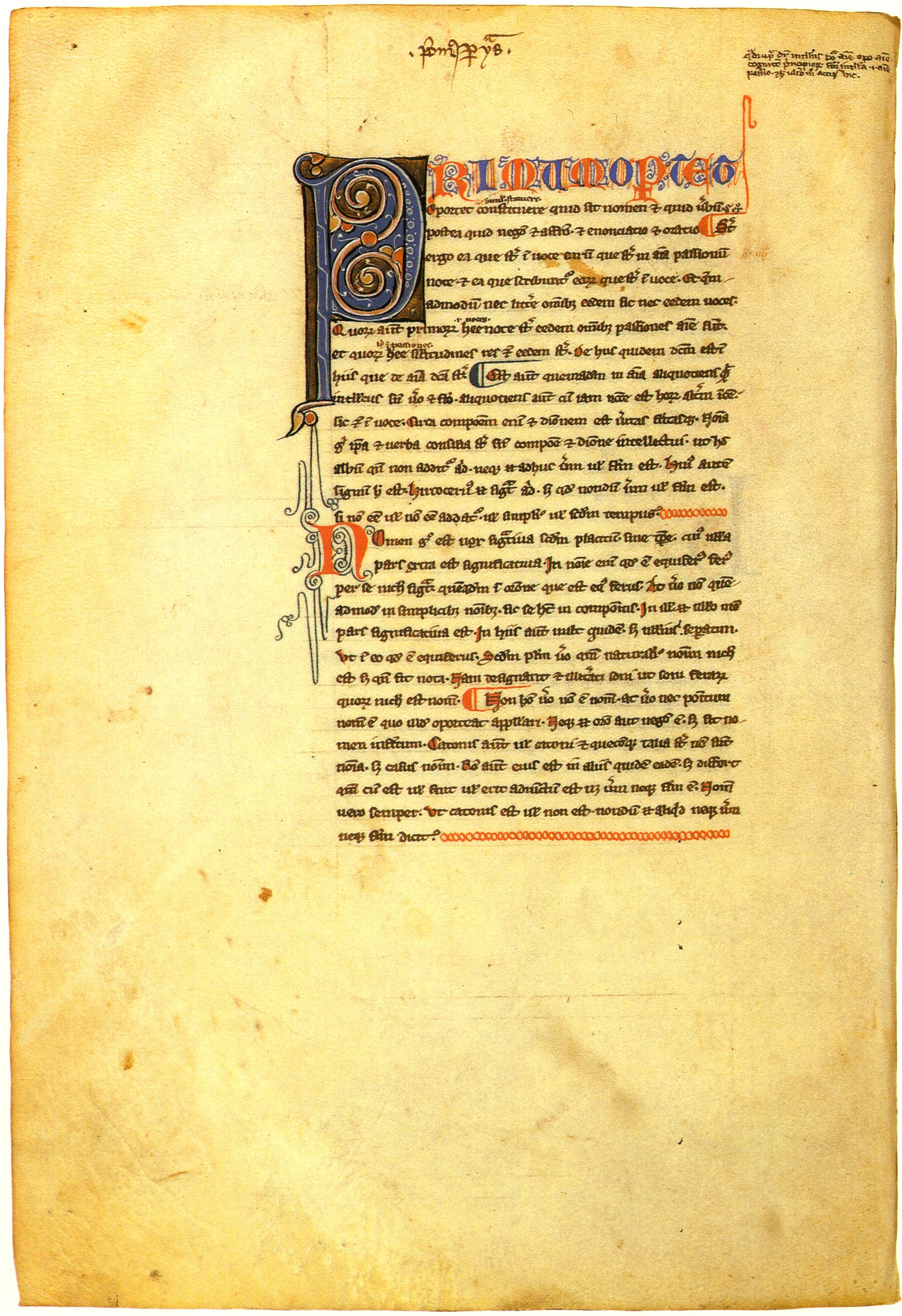
The beginning of Aristotle's De interpretatione in Boethius's Latin translation

Boethius's best known work is the Consolation of Philosophy (De consolatione philosophiae), which he wrote at the very end of his career, awaiting his execution in prison. This work represented an imaginary dialogue between himself and philosophy, with philosophy personified as a woman, arguing that despite the apparent inequality of the world, there is, in Platonic fashion, a higher power and everything else is secondary to that divine Providence.

Several manuscripts survived and these were widely edited, translated and printed throughout the late 15th century and later in Europe. Beyond Consolation of Philosophy, his lifelong project was a deliberate attempt to preserve ancient classical knowledge, particularly philosophy. Boethius intended to translate all the works of Aristotle and Plato from the original Greek into Latin.

=== De topicis differentiis ===
His completed translations of Aristotle's works on logic were the only significant portions of Aristotle available in Latin Christendom from the sixth century until the rediscovery of Aristotle in the 12th century. However, some of his translations (such as his treatment of the topoi in The Topics) were mixed with his own commentary, which reflected both Aristotelian and Platonic concepts.

The commentaries themselves have been lost. In addition to his commentary on the Topics, Boethius composed two treatises on Topical argumentation, In Ciceronis Topica and De topicis differentiis. The first work has six books, and is largely a response to Cicero's Topica. The first book of In Ciceronis Topica begins with a dedication to Patricius. It includes distinctions and assertions important to Boethius's overall philosophy, such as his view of the role of philosophy as "establish[ing] our judgment concerning the governing of life", and definitions of logic from Plato, Aristotle and Cicero. He breaks logic into three parts: that which defines, that which divides, and that which deduces.

He asserts that there are three types of arguments: those of necessity, of ready believability, and sophistry. He follows Aristotle in defining one sort of Topic as the maximal proposition, a proposition which is somehow shown to be universal or readily believable. The other sort of Topic, the differentiae, are "Topics that contain and include the maximal propositions"; means of categorizing the Topics which Boethius credits to Cicero.

Book II covers two kinds of topics: those from related things and those from extrinsic topics. Book III discusses the relationship among things studied through Topics, Topics themselves, and the nature of definition. Book IV analyzes partition, designation and relationships between things (such as pairing, numbering, genus and species, etc.). After a review of his terms, Boethius spends Book V discussing Stoic logic and Aristotelian causation. Book VI relates the nature of the Topic to causes.

In Topicis Differentiis has four books; Book I discusses the nature of rhetorical and dialectical Topics together, Boethius's overall purpose being "to show what the Topics are, what their differentiae are, and which are suited for what syllogisms." He distinguishes between argument (that which constitutes belief) and argumentation (that which demonstrates belief). Propositions are divided into three parts: those that are universal, those that are particular, and those that are somewhere in between. These distinctions, and others, are applicable to both types of Topical argument, rhetorical and dialectical. Books II and III are primarily focused on Topics of dialectic (syllogisms), while Book IV concentrates on the unit of the rhetorical Topic, the enthymeme. Topical argumentation is at the core of Boethius's conception of dialectic, which "have categorical rather than conditional conclusions, and he conceives of the discovery of an argument as the discovery of a middle term capable of linking the two terms of the desired conclusion."

Not only are these texts of paramount importance to the study of Boethius, they are also crucial to the history of topical lore. It is largely due to Boethius that the Topics of Aristotle and Cicero were revived, and the Boethian tradition of topical argumentation spans its influence throughout the Middle Ages and into the early Renaissance: "In the works of Ockham, Buridan, Albert of Saxony, and the Pseudo-Scotus, for instance, many of the rules of consequence bear a strong resemblance to or are simply identical with certain Boethian Topics ... Boethius's influence, direct and indirect, on this tradition is enormous."

It was also in De Topicis Differentiis that Boethius made a unique contribution to the discourse on dialectic and rhetoric. Topical argumentation for Boethius is dependent upon a new category for the topics discussed by Aristotle and Cicero, and "[u]nlike Aristotle, Boethius recognizes two different types of Topics. First, he says, a Topic is a maximal proposition (maxima propositio), or principle; but there is a second kind of Topic, which he calls the differentia of a maximal proposition. Maximal propositions are "propositions [that are] known per se, and no proof can be found for these."

This is the basis for the idea that demonstration (or the construction of arguments) is dependent ultimately upon ideas or proofs that are known so well and are so fundamental to human understanding of logic that no other proofs come before it. They must hold true in and of themselves. According to Stump, "the role of maximal propositions in argumentation is to ensure the truth of a conclusion by ensuring the truth of its premises either directly or indirectly."These propositions would be used in constructing arguments through the Differentia, which is the second part of Boethius's theory. This is "the genus of the intermediate in the argument." So maximal propositions allow room for an argument to be founded in some sense of logic while differentia are critical for the demonstration and construction of arguments.

Boethius's definition of "differentiae" is that they are "the Topics of arguments ... The Topics which are the Differentiae of [maximal] propositions are more universal than those propositions, just as rationality is more universal than man." This is the second part of Boethius's unique contribution to the field of rhetoric. Differentia operate under maximal propositions to "be of use in finding maximal propositions as well as intermediate terms," or the premises that follow maximal propositions.

Though Boethius is drawing from Aristotle's Topics, Differentiae are not the same as Topics in some ways. Boethius arranges differentiae through statements, instead of generalized groups as Aristotle does. Stump articulates the difference. They are "expressed as words or phrases whose expansion into appropriate propositions is neither intended nor readily conceivable", unlike Aristotle's clearly defined four groups of Topics. Aristotle had hundreds of topics organized into those four groups, whereas Boethius has twenty-eight "Topics" that are "highly ordered among themselves." This distinction is necessary to understand Boethius as separate from past rhetorical theories.

Maximal propositions and Differentiae belong not only to rhetoric, but also to dialectic. Boethius defines dialectic through an analysis of "thesis" and hypothetical propositions. He claims that "[t]here are two kinds of questions. One is that called, 'thesis' by the [Greek] dialecticians. This is the kind of question which asks about and discusses things stripped of relation to other circumstances; it is the sort of question dialecticians most frequently dispute about—for example, 'Is pleasure the greatest good?' [or] 'Should one marry?'." Dialectic has "dialectical topics" as well as "dialectical-rhetorical topics", all of which are still discussed in De Topicis Differentiis. Dialectic, especially in Book I, comprises a major component of Boethius's discussion on Topics.

Boethius planned to completely translate Plato's Dialogues, but there is no known surviving translation, if it was actually ever begun.

=== De arithmetica ===
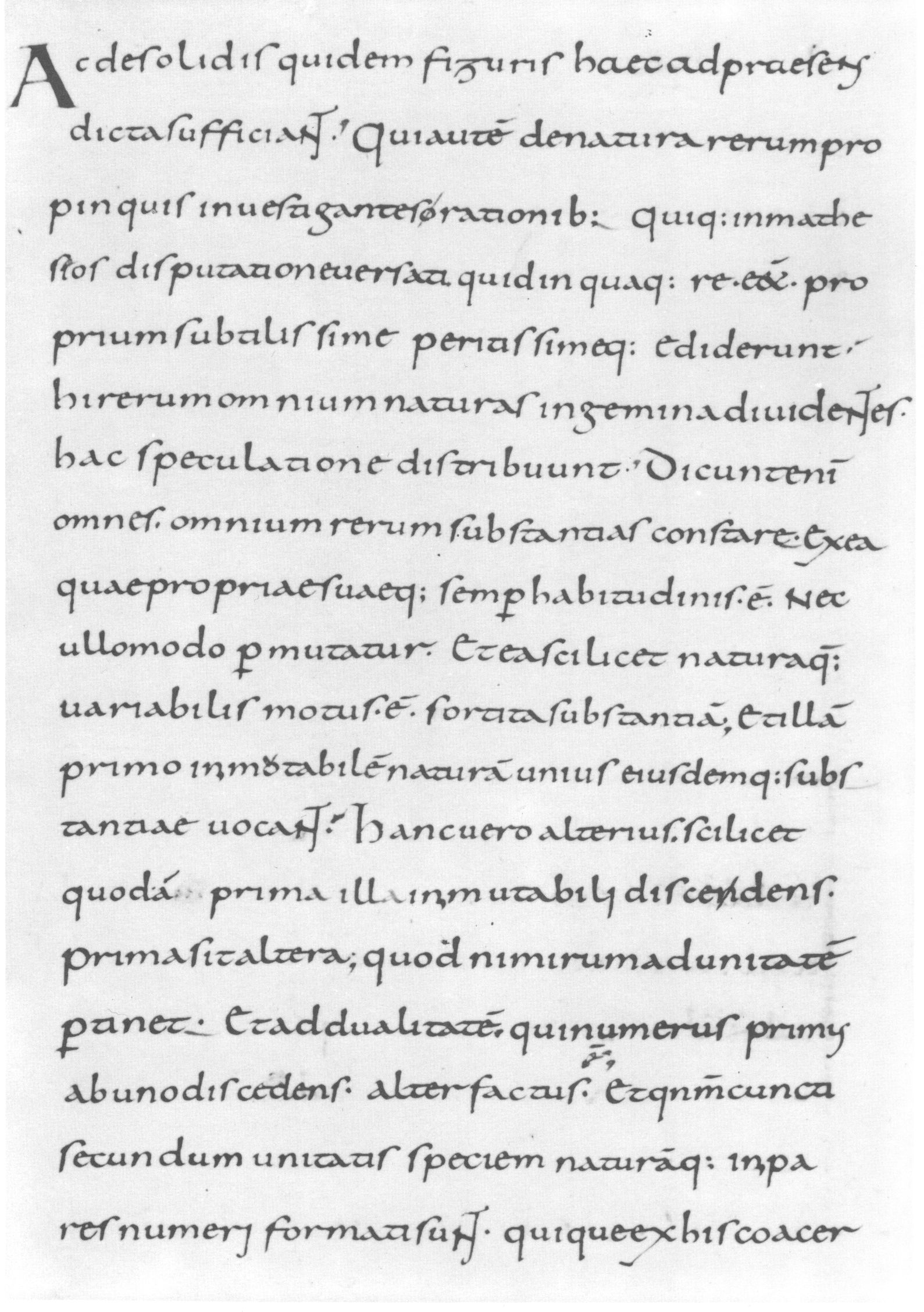
Boethius's De arithmetica in a manuscript written for Charles the Bald

Boethius chose to pass on the great Greco-Roman culture to future generations by writing manuals on music, astronomy, geometry and arithmetic.

Several of Boethius's writings, which were hugely influential during the Middle Ages, drew on the thinking of Porphyry and Iamblichus. Boethius wrote a commentary on the Isagoge by Porphyry, which highlighted the existence of the problem of universals: whether these concepts are subsistent entities which would exist whether anyone thought of them, or whether they only exist as ideas. This topic concerning the ontological nature of universal ideas was one of the most vocal controversies in medieval philosophy.

Besides these advanced philosophical works, Boethius is also reported to have translated important Greek texts on the topics of the quadrivium His loose translation of Nicomachus's treatise on arithmetic (De institutione arithmetica libri duo) and his textbook on music (De institutione musica libri quinque, unfinished) contributed to medieval education. De arithmetica begins with modular arithmetic, such as even and odd, evenly even, evenly odd, and oddly even. He then turns to unpredicted complexity by categorizing numbers and parts of numbers. His translations of Euclid on geometry and Ptolemy on astronomy, if they were completed, no longer survive. Boethius made Latin translations of Aristotle's De interpretatione and Categories with commentaries. In his article The Ancient Classics in the Mediaeval Libraries, James Stuart Beddie cites Boethius as the reason Aristotle's works were popular in the Middle Ages, as Boethius preserved many of the philosopher's works.

=== De institutione musica ===
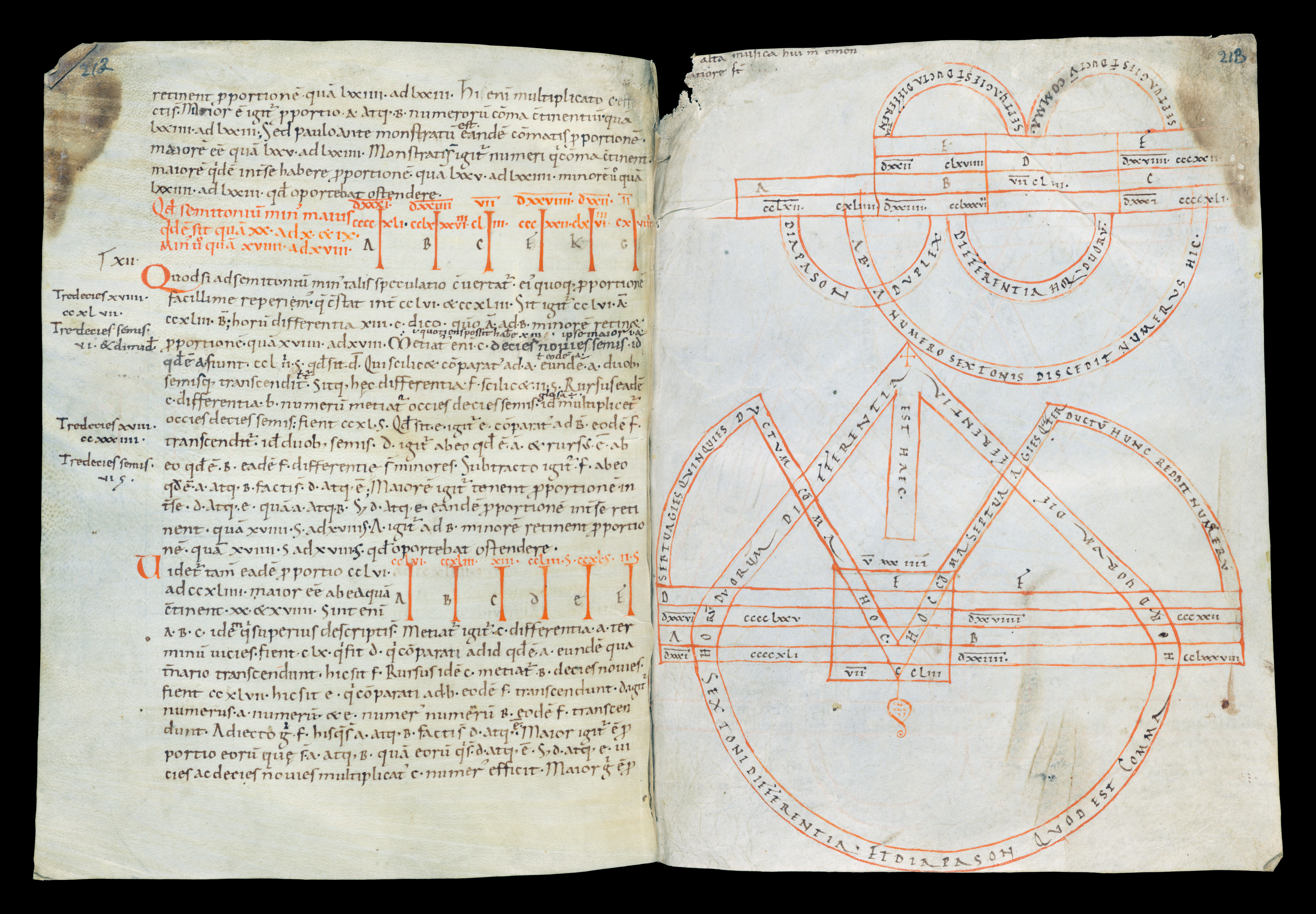
10th-century manuscript of Boethius's De institutione musica

Boethius's De institutione musica or De musica was one of the first musical texts to be printed in Venice between the years of 1491 and 1492. It was written toward the beginning of the sixth century and helped medieval theorists during the ninth century and onwards understand ancient Greek music. Like his Greek predecessors, Boethius believed that arithmetic and music were intertwined, and helped to mutually reinforce the understanding of each, and together exemplified the fundamental principles of order and harmony in the understanding of the universe as it was known during his time.

In De Musica, Boethius introduced the threefold classification of music:

- Musica mundana – music of the spheres/world; this "music" was not actually audible and was to be understood rather than heard
- Musica humana – harmony of human body and spiritual harmony
- Musica instrumentalis – instrumental music

In De musica I.2, Boethius describes 'musica instrumentis' as music produced by something under tension (e.g., strings), by wind (e.g., aulos), by water, or by percussion (e.g., cymbals). Boethius himself does not use the term 'instrumentalis', which was used by Adalbold II of Utrecht (975–1026) in his Epistola cum tractatu. The term is much more common in the 13th century and later. It is also in these later texts that musica instrumentalis is firmly associated with audible music in general, including vocal music. Scholars have traditionally assumed that Boethius also made this connection, possibly under the header of wind instruments ("administratur ... aut spiritu ut tibiis" (Note: "Haec vero administratur aut intentione ut nervis, aut spiritu ut tibiis, vel his, quae ad aquam moventur, aut percussione quadam, ut in his, quae in concava quaedam aerea feriuntur, atque inde diversi efficiuntur soni." Translated: "This, however, is operated by the motion of a string, or the wind of a pipe, or to those, which are moved by the water, or the beat of time, as in the following, which is striking a kind of brass hollow, and in the other are made of a corresponding sound.")), but Boethius himself never writes about "instrumentalis" as separate from "instrumentis" explicitly in his very brief description.

In one of his works within De institutione musica, Boethius said that "music is so naturally united with us that we cannot be free from it even if we so desired." During the Middle Ages, Boethius was connected to several texts that were used to teach liberal arts. Although he did not address the subject of trivium, he did write many treatises explaining the principles of rhetoric, grammar, and logic. During the Middle Ages, his works of these disciplines were commonly used when studying the three elementary arts. The historian R. W. Southern called Boethius "the schoolmaster of medieval Europe."

An 1872 German translation of "De Musica" was the magnum opus of Oscar Paul.

Around 140 medieval manuscripts of De Musica have survived to the present day. The scholar Christopher de Hamel argues that the copy held at the Alexander Turnbull Library in New Zealand was originally commissioned and owned by Thomas Becket, following his appointment as Archbishop of Canterbury in 1162.

=== Opuscula sacra ===
Boethius also wrote Christian theological treatises, which supported orthodox theology and condemned Arianism and other heterodox forms of Christianity.

Five theological works are known:

- De Trinitate – "The Trinity", where he defends the Council of Chalcedon Trinitarian position, that God is in three persons who have no differences in nature. He argues against the Arian view of the nature of God, which put him at odds with the faith of the Arian King of Italy.
- Utrum Pater et filius et Spiritus Sanctus de divinitate substantialiter praedicentur – "Whether Father, Son and Holy Spirit are Substantially Predicated of the Divinity", a short work where he uses reason and Aristotelian epistemology to argue that the Catholic views of the nature of God are correct.
- Quomodo substantiae, Boethius's claim that all substances are good.
- De fide catholica – "On the Catholic Faith"
- Contra Eutychen et Nestorium – "Against Eutyches and Nestorius," from c. 513, which dates it as the earliest of his theological works. Eutyches and Nestorius were contemporaries in the early to mid-5th century who held divergent Christological theologies. Boethius argues for a middle ground in conformity with Catholic faith.

His theological works played an important part during the Middle Ages in philosophical thought, including the fields of logic, ontology, and metaphysics.

== Dates of works ==
Gravestone of Boethius in the Pavia Civic Museum

Dates of composition:

Mathematical works

- De arithmetica (On Arithmetic, c. 500) adapted translation of the Introductio Arithmeticae by Nicomachus of Gerasa (c. 160 – c. 220).
- De musica (On Music, c. 510), based on a lost work by Nicomachus of Gerasa and on Ptolemy's Harmonica.
- Possibly a treatise on geometry, extant only in fragments.

Logical works

A) Translations

- Porphyry's Isagoge
- In Categorias Aristotelis: Aristotle's Categories
- De interpretatione vel periermenias: Aristotle's De Interpretatione
- Interpretatio priorum Analyticorum (two versions): Aristotle's Prior Analytics
- Interpretatio Topicorum Aristotelis: Aristotle's Topics
- Interpretatio Elenchorum Sophisticorum Aristotelis: Aristotle's Sophistical Refutations

B) Commentaries

- In Isagogen Porphyrii commenta (two commentaries, the first based on a translation by Marius Victorinus, (c. 504–05); the second based on Boethius's own translation (507–509) ).
- In Categorias Aristotelis (c. 509–11)
- In librum Aristotelis de interpretatione Commentaria minora (not before 513)
- In librum Aristotelis de interpretatione Commentaria majora (c. 515–16)
- In Aristotelis Analytica Priora (c. 520–523)
- Commentaria in Topica Ciceronis (incomplete: the end the sixth book and the seventh are missing)

Original treatises

- De divisione (515–520?)
- De syllogismo cathegorico (505–506)
- Introductio ad syllogismos cathegoricos (c. 523)
- De hypotheticis syllogismis (516–522)
- De topicis differentiis (c. 522–23)
- Opuscula Sacra (Theological Treatises)
  - De Trinitate (c. 520–21)
  - Utrum Pater et Filius et Spiritus Sanctus de divinitate substantialiter praedicentur (Whether Father and Son and Holy Spirit are Substantially Predicated of the Divinity)
  - Quomodo substantiae in eo quod sint bonae sint cum non sint substantialia bona [also known as De hebdomadibus] (How Substances are Good in that they Exist, when They are not Substantially Good)
  - De fide Catholica
  - Contra Eutychen et Nestorium (Against Eutyches and Nestorius)
- De consolatione Philosophiae (524–525).

== Legacy ==
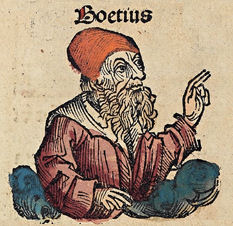
Depiction of Boethius in the Nuremberg Chronicle

Edward Kennard Rand dubbed Boethius the "last of the Roman philosophers and the first of the scholastic theologians". Despite the use of his mathematical texts in the early universities, it is his final work, the Consolation of Philosophy, that assured his legacy in the Middle Ages and beyond. This work is cast as a dialogue between Boethius himself, at first bitter and despairing over his imprisonment, and the spirit of philosophy, depicted as a woman of wisdom and compassion. "Alternately composed in prose and verse, the Consolation teaches acceptance of hardship in a spirit of philosophical detachment from misfortune".

Parts of the work are reminiscent of the Socratic method of Plato's dialogues, as the spirit of philosophy questions Boethius and challenges his emotional reactions to adversity. The work was translated into Old English by King Alfred and later into English by Chaucer and Queen Elizabeth. Many manuscripts survive and it was extensively edited, translated and printed throughout Europe from the 14th century onwards.

"The Boethian Wheel" is a model for Boethius' belief that history is a wheel, a metaphor that Boethius uses frequently in the Consolation; it remained very popular throughout the Middle Ages, and is still often seen today. As the wheel turns, those who have power and wealth will turn to dust; men may rise from poverty and hunger to greatness, while those who are great may fall with the turn of the wheel. It was represented in the Middle Ages in many relics of art depicting the rise and fall of man. Descriptions of "The Boethian Wheel" can be found in the literature of the Middle Ages from the Romance of the Rose to Chaucer.

De topicis differentiis was the basis for one of the first works of logic in a western European vernacular, a selection of excerpts translated into Old French by John of Antioch in 1282.

== Veneration ==
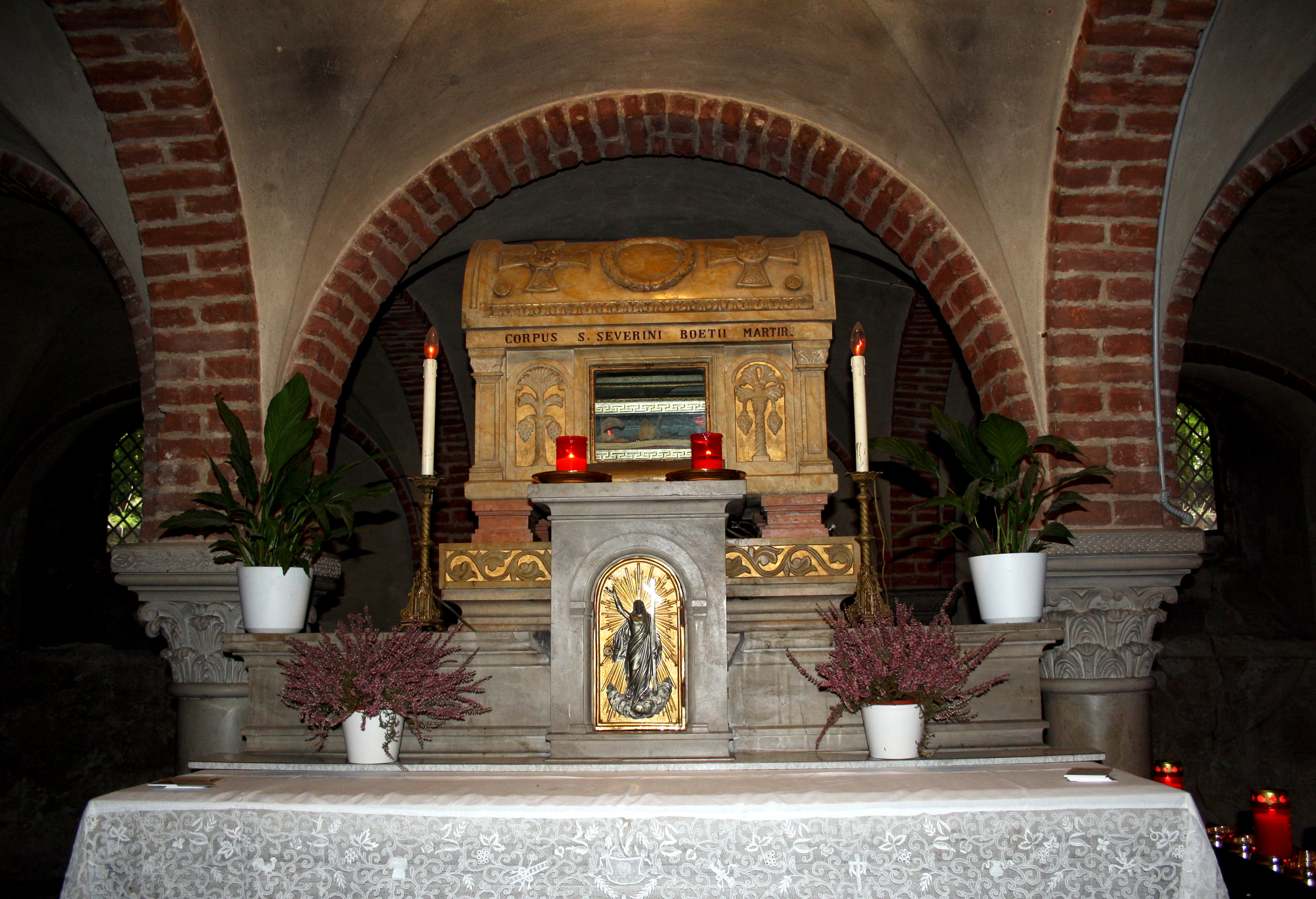
The Tomb of Boethius in San Pietro in Ciel d'Oro

Boethius was regarded as a Christian martyr by those who lived in succeeding centuries after his death. Currently, he is recognized as a saint and martyr for the Christian faith. He is included within the Roman Martyrology, though to Watkins "his status as martyr is dubious". His cult is held in Pavia, where Boethius's status as a saint was confirmed in 1883, and in the Church of Santa Maria in Portico in Rome. His feast day is 23 October, provided by some as a date for his death. In the current Martyrologium Romanum, his feast is still restricted to that diocese. Pope Benedict XVI explained the relevance of Boethius to modern-day Christians by linking his teachings to an understanding of Providence.

== In popular culture ==
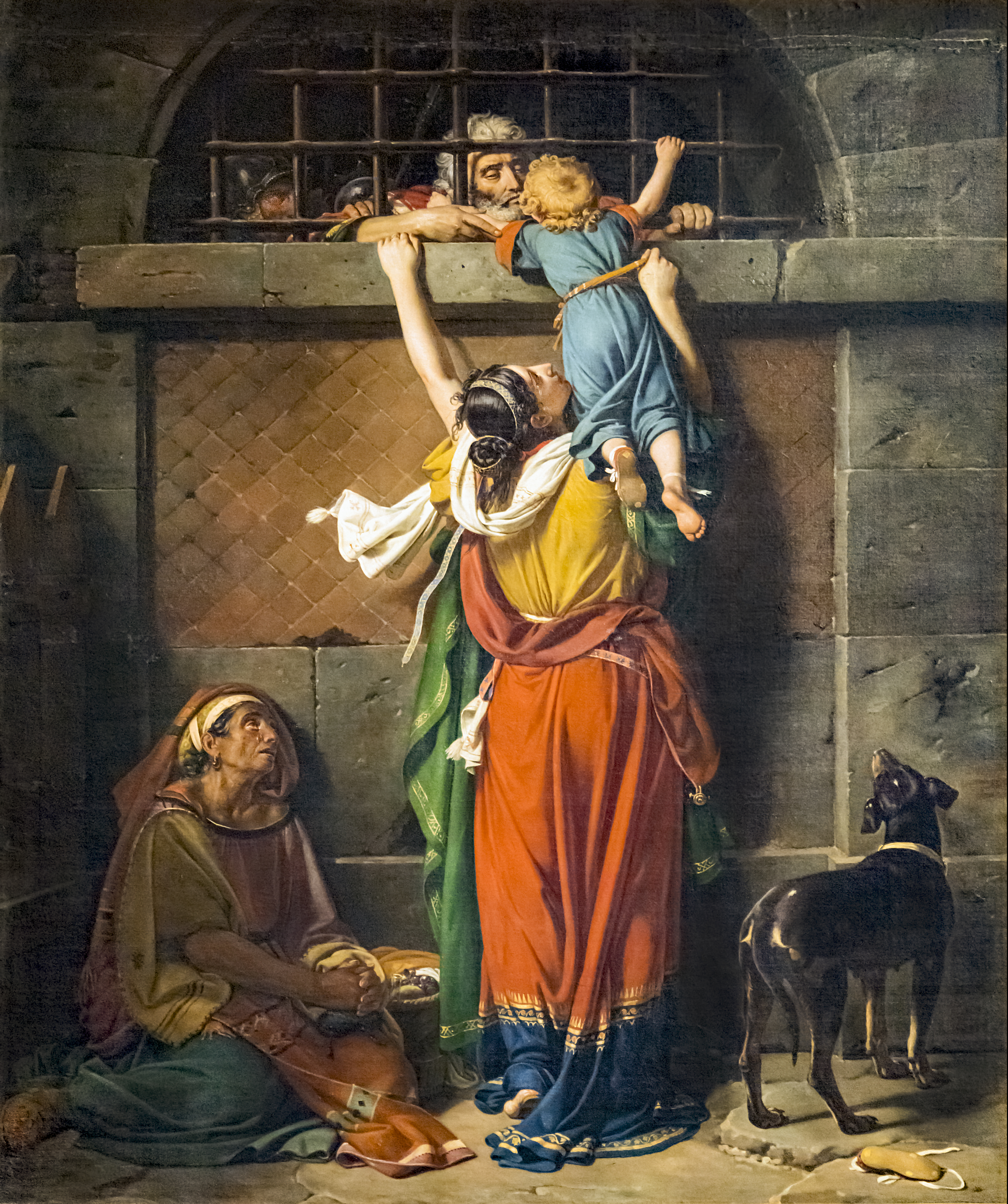
Boethius's Farewell To His Family by Jean-Victor Schnetz

In Dante Alighieri's Divine Comedy, the spirit of Boethius is pointed out by Saint Thomas Aquinas and is mentioned further in the poem.

In the novel A Confederacy of Dunces by John Kennedy Toole, Boethius is the favorite philosopher of the main character, Ignatius J. Reilly. The "Boethian Wheel" is a theme throughout the book, which won the Pulitzer Prize for Fiction in 1981.

Boethius is cited in Umberto Eco's novel "The Name of the Rose".

C. S. Lewis references Boethius in chapter 27 of the Screwtape Letters.

Boethius also appears in the 2002 film 24 Hour Party People where he is played by Christopher Eccleston.

In 1976, a lunar crater was named in honor of Boethius.

The title of Alain de Botton's book, The Consolations of Philosophy, is derived from Boethius's Consolation.

A codex of Boethius's The Consolation of Philosophy is the focus of The Late Scholar, a Lord Peter Wimsey novel by Jill Paton Walsh.

== See also ==
- Peter Abelard
- De Fide Catolica
- Elpis (wife of Boethius)
- Prison literature

== Notes ==
Preceded by Flavius Inportunus (alone)	Consul of the Roman Empire; 510	Succeeded by Arcadius Placidus Magnus Felix, Flavius Secundinus
