= Catholicism (disambiguation) =

Catholicism primarily designates the faith, doctrine, practice and system of the Catholic Church. It may also refer to:

- Catholicity, the core set of beliefs of various Christian denominations
- Christian denominations and movements including:
  - Anglo-Catholicism, a religious movement of the Anglican Communion
    - Affirming Catholicism, a religious movement within the Anglican Communion
  - Black Catholicism, the expression of the Catholic Church among African Americans
  - Eastern Catholicism, Eastern rite particular churches of the Catholic Church, in full communion with the Pope in Rome
    - Greek Catholicism, Eastern Catholic Churches that follow the Byzantine Rite (a.k.a. Greek Rite)
    - Syriac Catholicism, Eastern Catholic Churches that follow the Syriac Rite
  - Folk Catholicism, a religious and social movement within the Catholic Church
  - Independent Catholicism, an independent sacramental movement originally from the Catholic Church
    - Old Catholicism, Western churches which separated from the see of Rome after the First Vatican council of 1869–70
  - Liberal Catholicism, the liberal branch within the Catholic Church
  - National Catholicism, a nationalist branch within the Catholic Church in Francoist Spain
  - Political Catholicism, the political and social doctrines of the Catholic Church
  - Traditionalist Catholicism, a conservative religious movement within Catholicism
  - Western Catholicism or Latin Catholicism

== See also ==
- Catholic (disambiguation)
- Catholic Church (disambiguation)
