= National Catholic Church =

National Catholic Church may refer to several independent Christian churches, often part of Independent Catholicism:

- American National Catholic Church
- Lithuanian National Catholic Church
- Mexican Catholic Apostolic Church
- Philippine Independent Church
- Polish National Catholic Church
- Slovak National Catholic Church

== See also ==
- Catholic Church (disambiguation)
- Catholic (disambiguation)
- Polish Catholic (disambiguation)
