= Holy Catholic Church =

Holy Catholic Church may refer to:

- Catholic Church
- Holy Catholic Church (Anglican Rite)
- Holy Catholic Church in China
- Holy Catholic Church of Japan
- Holy Catholic Apostolic Church, another name of the Catholic Apostolic Church
- Four Marks of the Church

== See also ==
- Catholic Church (disambiguation)
- Catholic (term)
