= Orthodox =

Orthodox, Orthodoxy, or Orthodoxism may refer to:

== Religion ==
- Orthodoxy, adherence to accepted norms, more specifically adherence to creeds, especially within Christianity and Judaism, but also less commonly in non-Abrahamic religions like Neo-paganism or Hinduism

=== Christian ===
- Christian orthodoxy

==== Traditional Christian denominations ====
- Eastern Orthodoxy, which accepts the theological resolutions of the Council of Chalcedon
- Oriental Orthodoxy, which does not accept the theological resolutions of the Council of Chalcedon

==== Modern denominations ====
- Lutheran orthodoxy, an era in the history of Lutheranism which began in 1580 from the writing of the Book of Concord
- Neo-orthodoxy, a theological position also known as dialectical theology
- Orthodox Presbyterian Church, a confessional Presbyterian denomination located primarily in the northern United States
- Paleo-orthodoxy, (20th–21st century), a movement in the United States focusing on the consensus among the ecumenical councils and church fathers
- Reformed Orthodoxy (16th–18th century), a systematized, institutionalized and codified Reformed theology
- True Orthodox church, also called Old Calendarists, a movement that separated from the mainstream Eastern Orthodox Church in the 1920s over issues of ecumenism and calendar reform

==== Academic term ====
- Proto-orthodox Christianity, a term coined by New Testament scholar Bart D. Ehrman to describe the Early Christian movement which was the precursor of Christian orthodoxy

=== Non-Christian ===
- Orthodox Bahá'í Faith, a small Baha'i denomination
- Orthodox Islam, generally refers to Sunni Islam
- Orthodox Judaism, a branch of Judaism
  - Haredi Judaism, groups within Orthodox Judaism that reject modern secular culture
    - Hasidic Judaism, a sub-group within Haredi Judaism noted for its religious conservatism and, typically, social seclusion
  - Modern Orthodox Judaism, is a movement within Orthodox Judaism
- Kemetic Orthodoxy, an Egyptian neo-pagan religion that intends to reform and restore ancient Egyptian religion
- Slavic Native Faith or Orthodoxy, a term used by Neo-Slavic pagan religious organizations

== Other uses ==
- Left-arm orthodox spin, a bowling technique in cricket
- Orthodox (album), a 2013 album by American rock band Beware of Darkness
- Orthodox (band), an American metalcore band from Tennessee.
- Orthodox File Managers, a user interface to work with file systems
- Orthodox (Jordan), a Jordanian basketball club
- Orthodox Marxism, the dominant form of Marxist philosophy between the death of Karl Marx and the beginning of World War I
- Orthodox seed, a seed which may be preserved via drying or freezing
- Orthodox stance, a way of positioning the feet and hands in combat sports

== See also ==
- Anti-Orthodox (disambiguation)
- Heterodoxy
- Orthodox calendar (disambiguation)
- Orthodox Church (disambiguation)
- Orthodox Communion (disambiguation)
- Orthodoxy by country (disambiguation)
- Unorthodox (disambiguation)
