= Orthodox Church =

The Orthodox Church and Orthodox Christianity most often refer to one of two Eastern Christian churches:

- Eastern Orthodox Church, the second-largest Christian church in the world
- Oriental Orthodox Churches, a branch of Eastern Christianity

Orthodox Church may also refer to:

- Early Church, the Christian religion prior to the First Council of Nicaea
- Christian orthodoxy, the doctrines subscribed to by the early church
- Orthodox Anglican Communion, a communion of Anglican churches
- African Orthodox Church, a predominantly African-American Christian denomination
- Evangelical Orthodox Church, an Eastern Protestant Christian denomination
- Orthodox Presbyterian Church, a confessional Presbyterian denomination located primarily in the United States
- Orthodox Presbyterian Church of New Zealand, a denomination formed in the 1960s led by George Mackenzie
- State church of the Roman Empire, Roman Empire's state religion after AD 380

== See also ==
- Orthodoxy § Religions
- Eastern Orthodoxy
- Lutheran orthodoxy
- Reformed orthodoxy
- Neo-orthodoxy
- True Orthodox church, a movement within Eastern Orthodox Christianity
- Western Rite Orthodoxy, Eastern Orthodox churches which use western forms of liturgy
- Proto-orthodox Christianity
- Catholic Church (disambiguation)
- Orthodox (disambiguation)
- Orthodox calendar (disambiguation)
- Orthodox Communion (disambiguation)
- Orthodoxy by country (disambiguation)
- Orthodox Catholic Church (disambiguation)
