= Roman Catholic Church (disambiguation) =

Roman Catholic Church, Roman Church or Church of Rome may refer to:

- The Catholic Church: the churches in full communion with the pope in Rome
  - The Latin Church in particular: one of the 24 autonomous (sui iuris) churches that constitute the Catholic Church
    - Any part of the Latin Church that uses the Roman Rite
    - The Diocese of Rome, the local Catholic church of the city of Rome, including Vatican City

== See also ==
- Roman Catholic (term)
- Catholic (disambiguation)
- Catholic Church (disambiguation)
- Catholic (term)
- Catholicity
- Church (disambiguation)
