= Orthodox Communion =

Orthodox Communion may refer to:

- Eastern Orthodox Church
- Oriental Orthodox Churches

== See also ==
- Orthodox (disambiguation)
- Orthodox Church (disambiguation)
- Communion (disambiguation)
- Eastern Orthodox Church organization
