= John Moorhead (historian) =

Australian historian

John Moorhead (born 1948) is an Australian historian specializing in late antiquity and the early Middle Ages. A Fellow of the Australian Academy of Humanities, and now an emeritus, he was formerly McCaughey Professor of History at the University of Queensland, Brisbane.

Moorhead is best known for his The Roman Empire Divided 400-700, which deals with the post-Roman world. He is also a scholar of Pope Gregory the Great and the teaching of Latin, in which he claims to finally have something in common with “the Venerable Bede." His work with religious sources of the period led to an association with the university's Islamic Studies program, in which he lectured on "Christians, Muslims and Jews in the Middle Ages".

Moorhead is married to Lynn Selepak, originally from Perth, Western Australia. They live in Brisbane.

== Select bibliography ==
- Theoderic in Italy Oxford 1992
- Justinian London and New York 1994
- Ambrose of Milan London and New York 1999
- The Roman Empire Divided 400-700 London and New York 2001 (2nd edition 2013)
- Gregory the Great London and New York 2005
- The Popes and the Church of Rome in Late Antiquity London and New York 2015 (paperback 2017)
