= Unorthodox =

Unorthodox may refer to:

== Music ==
- Unorthodox (band), an American doom metal band
- Unorthodox (Edge of Sanity album), 1992
- Unorthodox (Snow Tha Product album), 2011
- "Unorthodox" (Joey Badass song), 2013
- "Unorthodox" (Wretch 32 song), 2011

== Television ==
- Unorthodox (miniseries), a 2020 Netflix miniseries loosely based on Deborah Feldman's memoir (see below)
- "Unorthodox" (Law & Order: Special Victims Unit), a television episode

== Other uses ==
- Unorthodox (podcast), a Jewish podcast hosted by Mark Oppenheimer, Stephanie Butnick, and Liel Leibovitz
- Unorthodox: The Scandalous Rejection of My Hasidic Roots, a 2012 memoir by Deborah Feldman

== See also ==
- Heterodoxy, any opinions or doctrines at variance with an official or orthodox position
- Orthodox (disambiguation)
