= De fide Catolica =

De fide Catolica may refer to:

- The edict "De fide catholica" issued by Emperor Theodosius in 380, establishing Christianity as the official religion of the Roman Empire
- The tractate De fide catholica of Boethius (480–524 or 525)
- De fide catholica ex Veteri et Novo Testamento contra Iudaeos by Isidore of Seville (560–636)
- The Summa contra Gentiles, also known as Tractatus de fide catholica, contra contra errores infidelium, of Thomas Aquinas (1225–1274)
- The constitution "De fide catholica" of the First Vatican Council, also called Dei Filius
- A form of belief in the Catholic faith

== See also ==
- Catholic (term)
