= Catholic Church (disambiguation) =

The Catholic Church, sometimes called the Roman Catholic Church, is the largest Christian church body.

Catholic Church may also refer to:

- One of the 24 particular churches sui iuris that form the Catholic Church:
  - The Latin Church, also known as the Roman Catholic Church or, historically, as the Western Church
  - The Eastern Catholic Churches, 23 Eastern churches in full communion with the Catholic Church
- Independent Catholicism, churches that broke away from the Catholic Church
- Other churches expressing apostolic origins and traditions of catholicity, such as:
  - The Eastern Orthodox Church
  - The Oriental Orthodox Churches
  - The Assyrian Church of the East
  - The Ancient Church of the East
- State church of the Roman Empire

== See also ==
- Catholic (disambiguation)
- Catholicism (disambiguation)
- Four Marks of the Church i.e. "one, holy, catholic and apostolic church"
- National Catholic Church (disambiguation)
- Orthodox Church (disambiguation)
- Roman Catholic Church (disambiguation)
- Traditionalist Catholicism
