= Orthodoxy by country =

Orthodoxy by country may refer to:

- Eastern Orthodoxy by country
- Oriental Orthodoxy by country
