= Catholic (disambiguation) =

Catholic may refer to:

== Christian denominations ==
- The Catholic Church, the largest Christian church, also referred to as the Roman Catholic Church
  - The Latin Church, also known as the Roman Catholic Church or Western Catholic Church
  - The Eastern Catholic Churches, several Eastern churches in full communion with Catholic Church
- Independent Catholicism, churches that historically and culturally stem from Catholicism but broke away from the Catholic Church
  - The Old Catholic Church, part of Independent Catholicism
  - The Liberal Catholic Church, part of Independent Catholicism
  - The Palmarian Catholic Church
  - The Philippine Independent Church
- Other churches expressing apostolic origins and traditions of catholicity, such as:
  - The Eastern Orthodox Church
  - Oriental Orthodoxy
  - The Assyrian Church of the East
  - The Ancient Church of the East
  - The Anglican churches
    - Anglo-Catholicism, a movement within Anglican churches
  - Evangelical Catholic Lutheranism

== Terminology ==
- Catholic (term), an overview of the use of the term in the Four Marks of the Church (one, holy, catholic, and apostolic) of the Nicene Creed
- Catholicity, the core set of beliefs common to several Catholic denominations

== Other uses ==
- Catholic (album), an album by Gavin Friday
- Catholics (novel), a 1972 novel by Brian Moore
- Catholics (ITV Sunday Night Theatre), a 1973 film directed by Jack Gold, based on the novel

== See also ==
- Roman Catholic (term)
- Roman Catholic Church (disambiguation)
- Catholic Church (disambiguation)
- Catholicism (disambiguation)
