= Orthodox calendar =

Orthodox calendar may refer to:

- Eastern Orthodox Church liturgical calendar
  - Revised Julian calendar, used by some Eastern Orthodox for the calculation of fixed feasts
  - Julian calendar, used by some Eastern Orthodox for the calculation of fixed feasts
- The OC wall calendar, an LGBT-themed photo wall calendar

== See also ==
- Orthodox Church (disambiguation)
