= Catholicity =

Beliefs and practices widely accepted by those that describe themselves as Catholic

Catholicity (from Ancient Greek: καθολικός, romanized: katholikós, lit. 'general', 'universal', via Latin: catholicus) is a concept pertaining to beliefs and practices that are widely accepted by numerous Christian denominations, most notably by those Christian denominations that describe themselves as catholic in accordance with the Four Marks of the Church, as expressed in the Nicene Creed formulated at the First Council of Constantinople in 381: "[I believe] in one, holy, catholic, and apostolic Church." The English adjective catholic is derived from the Ancient Greek adjective καθολικός (romanized: katholikos), meaning "general", "universal". Thus, "catholic" means that in the Christian Church the wholeness of the Christian faith, full and complete, all-embracing, and with nothing lacking, is proclaimed to all people without excluding any part of the faith or any class or group of people. An early definition for what is "catholic" was summarized in what is known as the Vincentian Canon in the 5th century Commonitory: "what has been believed everywhere, always, and by all."

This is distinct from the capitalized word Catholic, referring specifically to the Catholic Church and often, further, the Roman Catholic Church, used especially in ecumenical contexts and in countries where other churches use the term catholic, to distinguish it from broader meanings of the term. Though the community led by the pope in Rome is known as the Catholic Church, the traits of catholicity, and thus the term catholic, are also ascribed to denominations such as the Eastern Orthodox Church, the Oriental Orthodox Churches, and the Assyrian Church of the East. It also occurs in the language of churches that decisively split from the Roman Catholic Church, like Lutheranism and Anglicanism, as well as Independent Catholicism, Old Catholicism and other Christian denominations. While traits used to define catholicity, as well as recognition of these traits in other denominations, vary among these groups, such attributes include formal sacraments, an episcopal polity, apostolic succession, highly structured liturgical worship, and other shared Ecclesiology.

Among Protestant and related traditions, catholic is used in the sense of indicating a self-understanding of the universality of the confession and continuity of faith and practice from Early Christianity, encompassing the "whole company of God's redeemed people". Specifically among Moravian, Lutheran, Anglican, Methodist, and Reformed denominations the term "catholic" is used in claiming to be "heirs of the apostolic faith". These denominations consider themselves to be part of the catholic (universal) church, teaching that the term "designates the historic, orthodox mainstream of Christianity whose doctrine was defined by the ecumenical councils and creeds" and as such, most Reformers "appealed to this catholic tradition and believed they were in continuity with it." As such, the universality, or catholicity, of the church pertains to the entire body (or assembly) of believers united to Christ.

== History ==

(Not shown are ante-Nicene, nontrinitarian, and restorationist denominations.)

=== Summary of major divisions ===
A common belief related to catholicity is institutional continuity with the early Christian church founded by Jesus Christ. Many churches or communions of churches identify singularly or collectively as the authentic church. The following summarizes the major schisms and conflicts within Christianity, particularly within groups that identify as catholic; there are several competing historical interpretations as to which groups entered into schism with the original early church.

According to the theory of Pentarchy, the early undivided church came to be organized under the three patriarchs of Rome, Alexandria and Antioch, to which later were added the patriarchs of Constantinople and Jerusalem. The bishop of Rome was at that time recognized as first among them, as is stated, for instance, in canon 3 of the First Council of Constantinople (381)—many interpret "first" as meaning here first among equals—and doctrinal or procedural disputes were often referred to Rome, as when, on appeal by Athanasius against the decision of the Council of Tyre (335), Pope Julius I, who spoke of such appeals as customary, annulled the action of that council and restored Athanasius and Marcellus of Ancyra to their sees. The bishop of Rome was also considered to have the right to convene ecumenical councils. When the Imperial capital moved to Constantinople, Rome's influence was sometimes challenged. Nonetheless, Rome claimed special authority because of its connection to the Apostles Peter and Paul, who, many believe, were martyred and buried in Rome, and because the bishop of Rome saw himself as the successor of Peter. There are sources that suggest that Peter was not the first pope and never went to Rome.

The 431 Council of Ephesus, the third ecumenical council, was chiefly concerned with Nestorianism, which emphasized the distinction between the humanity and divinity of Jesus and taught that, in giving birth to Jesus Christ, the Virgin Mary could not be spoken of as giving birth to God. This Council rejected Nestorianism and affirmed that, as humanity and divinity are inseparable in the one person of Jesus Christ, his mother, the Virgin Mary, is thus Theotokos, God-bearer, Mother of God. The first great rupture in the Early Church followed this Council. Those who refused to accept the Council's ruling were largely Persian and are represented today by the Assyrian Church of the East and related churches, which, however, do not now hold a "Nestorian" theology. They are often called Ancient Oriental Churches.

The next major break was after the Council of Chalcedon (451). This Council repudiated Eutychian Monophysitism which stated that the divine nature completely subsumed the human nature in Christ. This Council declared that Christ, though one person, exhibited two natures "without confusion, without change, without division, without separation" and thus is both fully God and fully human. The Alexandrian Church rejected the terms adopted by this Council, and the Christian churches that follow the tradition of non-acceptance of the Council—they are not Monophysite in doctrine—are referred to as Pre-Chalcedonian or Oriental Orthodox Churches.

The next great rift within Christianity was in the 11th century. Longstanding doctrinal disputes, as well as conflicts between methods of church government, and the evolution of separate rites and practices, precipitated a split in 1054 that divided the church, this time between a "West" and an "East". Spain, England, France, the Holy Roman Empire, Poland, Bohemia, Slovakia, Scandinavia, the Baltic states, and Western Europe in general were in the Western camp, and Greece, Romania, Russia and many other Slavic lands, Anatolia, and the Christians in Syria and Egypt who accepted the Council of Chalcedon made up the Eastern camp. This division between the Western Church and the Eastern Church is called the East–West Schism.

In 1438, the Council of Florence convened, which featured a strong dialogue focussed on understanding the theological differences between the East and West, with the hope of reuniting the Catholic and Orthodox churches. Several eastern churches reunited, constituting some of the Eastern Catholic Churches.

Another major division in the church occurred in the 16th century with the Protestant Reformation, after which many parts of the Western Church rejected Papal authority, and some of the teachings of the Western Church at that time, and became known as "Reformed" or "Protestant".

A much less extensive rupture occurred when, after the Catholic Church's First Vatican Council, in which it officially proclaimed the dogma of papal infallibility, small clusters of Catholics in the Netherlands and in German-speaking countries formed the Old-Catholic (Altkatholische) Church.

== Beliefs and practices ==
Use of the terms "catholicity" and "catholicism" depends on context. For times preceding the Great Schism, it refers to the Nicene Creed and especially to tenets of Christology, i.e. the rejection of Arianism. For times after the Great Schism, Catholicism (with the capital C) in the sense of the Catholic Church, combines the Latin Church, the Eastern Catholic Churches of Greek tradition, and the other Eastern Catholic Churches. Liturgical and canonical practices vary between all these particular churches constituting the Roman and Eastern Catholic Churches (or, as Richard McBrien calls them, the "Communion of Catholic Churches"). Contrast this with the term Catholicos (but not Catholicism) in reference to the head of a Particular Church in Eastern Christianity. In the Roman Catholic Church, the term "catholic" is understood as to cover those who are baptized and in communion with the Pope.

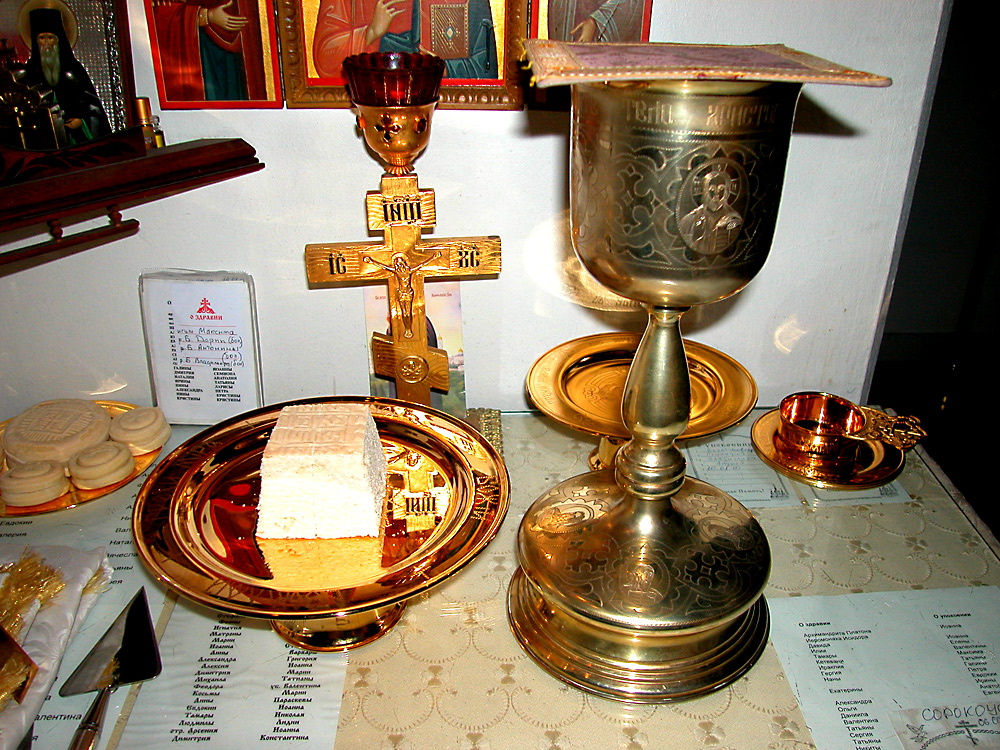
The weekly observance of the Liturgy of the Eucharist in the church service is considered a trait of catholicity

Other Christians use it in an intermediate sense, neither just those Christians in communion with Rome, but more narrow than all Christians who recite the Creeds. They use it to distinguish their position from a Calvinistic or Puritan form of Protestantism. It is then meaningful to attempt to draw up a list of common characteristic beliefs and practices of this definition of catholicity:

- Direct and continuous organizational descent from the Church founded by Jesus and guided by the Holy Spirit.
- Belief that Jesus Christ is Divine, a doctrine officially clarified in the First Council of Nicaea and expressed in the Nicene Creed.
- Belief in the Real Presence of Christ in the Eucharist, the belief that bread and wine truly become the Body of Christ at consecration.
- Belief in the Apostolic succession of ordained ministry.
- Belief in the Catholic (from the Greek καθολικός, meaning "universal") Church as the Body of Christ, where Jesus is the head.
- Belief in the necessity and efficacy of sacraments.
- Liturgical and personal use of the Sign of the Cross.
- The use of sacred images, candles, vestments and music, and often incense and water, in worship.
- Observation of the Christian liturgical year.
- Devotion to the saints, particularly Mary, the mother of Jesus, as the human mother of Jesus Christ, or Theotokos ("God-bearer" or "Mother of God"), a title that became "Catholic" only after the Nicene Council, with the Council of Ephesus in 431, but a rejection of her worship.
- Belief in the Communion of Saints.

=== Sacraments or sacred mysteries ===
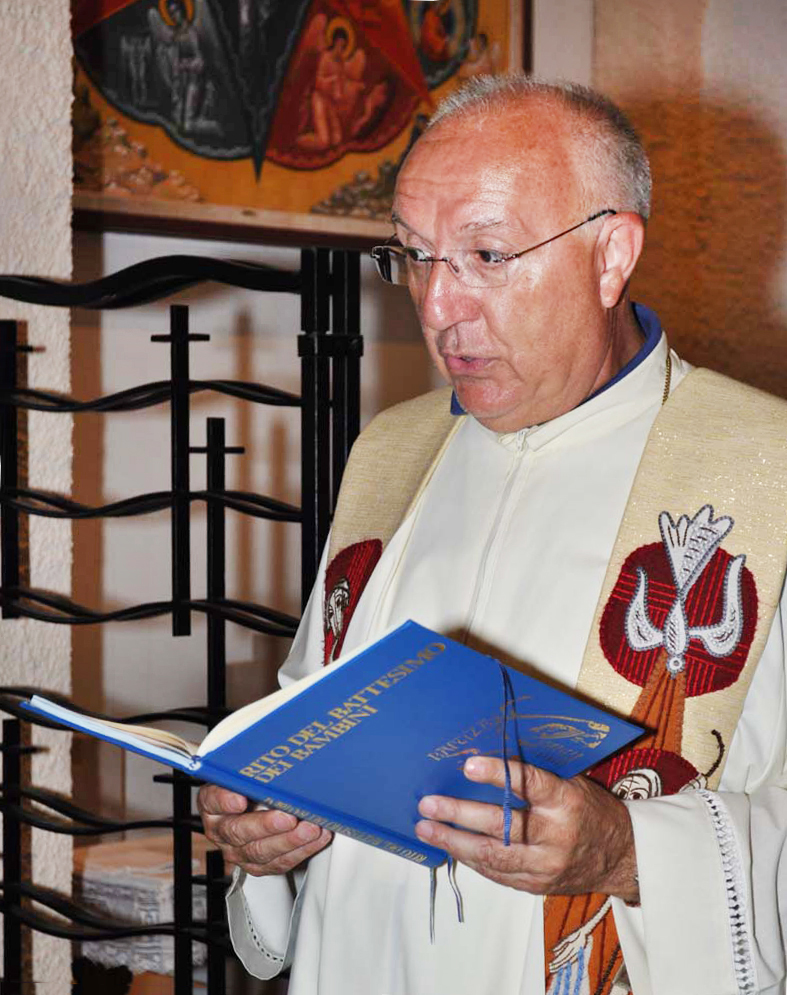
An Italian priest during the sacrament of Baptism

Churches in the Roman Catholic tradition administer seven sacraments or "sacred mysteries": Baptism, Confirmation or Chrismation, Eucharist, Penance, also known as Reconciliation, Anointing of the Sick, Holy Orders, and Matrimony. For Protestant Christians, only Baptism and Eucharist are considered sacraments.

In churches that consider themselves catholic, a sacrament is considered to be an efficacious visible sign of God's invisible grace. While the word mystery is used not only of these rites, but also with other meanings with reference to revelations of and about God and to God's mystical interaction with creation, the word sacrament (Latin: a solemn pledge), the usual term in the West, refers specifically to these rites.

- Baptism – the first sacrament of Christian initiation, the basis for all the other sacraments. Churches in the Catholic tradition consider baptism conferred in most Christian denominations "in the name of the Father, and of the Son, and of the Holy Spirit" (cf. Matthew 28:19) to be valid, since the effect is produced through the sacrament, independently of the faith of the minister, though not of the minister's intention. This is not necessarily the case in other churches. As stated in the Nicene Creed, Baptism is "for the forgiveness of sins", not only personal sins, but also of original sin, which it remits even in infants who have committed no actual sins. Expressed positively, forgiveness of sins means bestowal of the sanctifying grace by which the baptized person shares the life of God. The initiate "puts on Christ" (Galatians 3:27), and is "buried with him in baptism ... also raised with him through faith in the working of God" (Colossians 2:12).
- Confirmation or Chrismation – the second sacrament of Christian initiation, the means by which the gift of the Holy Spirit conferred in baptism is "strengthened and deepened" (see, for example, Catechism of the Catholic Church, §1303) by a sealing. In the Western tradition it is usually a separate rite from baptism, bestowed, following a period of education called catechesis, on those who have at least reached the age of discretion (about 7) and sometimes postponed until an age when the person is considered capable of making a mature independent profession of faith. It is considered to be of a nature distinct from the anointing with chrism (also called myrrh) that is usually part of the rite of baptism and that is not seen as a separate sacrament. In the Eastern tradition it is usually conferred in conjunction with baptism, as its completion, but is sometimes administered separately to converts or those who return to Orthodoxy. Some theologies consider this to be the outward sign of the inner "Baptism of the Holy Spirit", the special gifts (or charismata) of which may remain latent or become manifest over time according to God's will. Its "originating" minister is a validly consecrated bishop; if a priest (a "presbyter") confers the sacrament (as is permitted in some Catholic churches) the link with the higher order is indicated by the use of chrism blessed by a bishop. (In an Eastern Orthodox church, this is customarily, although not necessarily, done by the primate of the local autocephalous church.)
- Eucharist – the sacrament (the third of Christian initiation) by which the faithful receive their ultimate "daily bread", or "bread for the journey", by partaking of and in the Body and Blood of Jesus Christ and being participants in Christ's one eternal sacrifice. The bread and wine used in the rite are, according to Catholic faith, in the mystical action of the Holy Spirit, transformed to be Christ's Body and Blood—his Real Presence. This transformation is interpreted by some as transubstantiation or metousiosis, by others as consubstantiation or sacramental union.
- Penance (also called Confession and Reconciliation) – the first of the two sacraments of healing. It is also called the sacrament of conversion, of forgiveness, and of absolution. It is the sacrament of spiritual healing of a baptized person from the distancing from God involved in actual sins committed. It involves the penitent's contrition for sin (without which the rite does not have its effect), confession (which in highly exceptional circumstances can take the form of a corporate general confession) to a minister who has the faculty to exercise the power to absolve the penitent, and absolution by the minister. In some traditions (such as the Roman Catholic), the rite involves a fourth element – satisfaction – which is defined as signs of repentance imposed by the minister. In early Christian centuries, the fourth element was quite onerous and generally preceded absolution, but now it usually involves a simple task (in some traditions called a "penance") for the penitent to perform, to make some reparation and as a medicinal means of strengthening against further sinning.
- Anointing of the Sick (or Unction) – the second sacrament of healing. In it those who are suffering an illness are anointed by a priest with oil consecrated by a bishop specifically for that purpose. In past centuries, when such a restrictive interpretation was customary, the sacrament came to be known as "Extreme Unction", i.e. "Final Anointing", as it still is among traditionalist Catholics. It was then conferred only as one of the "Last Rites". The other "Last Rites" are Penance (if the dying person is physically unable to confess, at least absolution, conditional on the existence of contrition, is given), and the Eucharist, which, when administered to the dying, is known as "Viaticum", a word whose original meaning in Latin was "provision for a journey".
- Holy Orders – the sacrament which integrates someone into the Holy Orders of bishops, priests (presbyters), and deacons, the threefold order of "administrators of the mysteries of God" (1 Corinthians 4:1), giving the person the mission to teach, sanctify, and govern. Only a bishop may administer this sacrament, as only a bishop holds the fullness of the Apostolic Ministry. Ordination as a bishop makes one a member of the body that has succeeded to that of the Apostles. Ordination as a priest configures a person to Christ the Head of the Church and the one essential Priest, empowering that person, as the bishops' assistant and vicar, to preside at the celebration of divine worship, and in particular to confect the sacrament of the Eucharist, acting "in persona Christi" (in the person of Christ). Ordination as a deacon configures the person to Christ the Servant of All, placing the deacon at the service of the Church, especially in the fields of the ministry of the Word, service in divine worship, pastoral guidance and charity. Deacons may later be further ordained to the priesthood, but only if they do not have a wife. In some traditions (such as those of the Roman Catholic Church), while married men may be ordained, ordained men may not marry. In others (such as the Anglican-Catholic Church), clerical marriage is permitted. (Note: In regard to the ordination of women to the episcopacy, one cannot underestimate the chasm that is currently developing between the Eastern Orthodox, Oriental and Roman Catholic churches, on the one hand, and the Lutheran, Anglican and Independent Catholic churches, on the other hand. Cardinal Walter Kasper, President of the Pontifical Council for Promoting Christian Unity, for example, noted this when he addressed some Anglican bishops in 2006. Quoting St Cyprian of Carthage (d. 258), he said the episcopate is one, which means that "each part of it is held by each one for the whole"; that bishops were instruments of unity not only within the contemporary Church, but also across time, within the universal Church. This being the case, he continued, "the decision for the ordination of women to the Episcopal office ... must not in any way involve a conflict between the majority and the minority." Such a decision should be made "with the consensus of the ancient Churches of the East and West." To do otherwise "would spell the end" to any kind of unity.) Moreover, some sectors of Anglicanism "in isolation of the whole" have approved the ordination of openly active homosexuals to the priesthood and episcopacy, in spite of the support that Rowan Williams, the Archbishop of Canterbury, spoke for Anglican teaching on homosexuality, which he said the church "could not change simply because of a shift in society's attitude", noting also that those churches blessing same-sex unions and consecrating openingly gay bishops would not be able "to take part as a whole in ecumenical and interfaith dialogue." Thus in ecumenical matters, only if the Roman Catholic as well as Orthodox churches come to an understanding with first tier or primary bishops of the Anglican Communion can those churches (representing 95% of global Catholicism) implement an agreement with second tier or secondary Anglican bishops and their respective Anglican communities. (Note: The Russian Orthodox Church, which because of the episcopal ordination of Gene Robinson severed its dialogue with the United States Episcopal Church, while declaring itself open to "contacts and cooperation with those American Episcopalians who remain faithful to the gospel's moral teaching", stated that it was willing to restore relations with those Episcopal dioceses that refused to recognize the election of Katharine Jefferts Schori as their Church's presiding bishop)
- Holy Matrimony (or Marriage) – is the sacrament of joining a man and a woman (according to the churches' doctrines) for mutual help and love (the unitive purpose), consecrating them for their particular mission of building up the Church and the world, and providing grace for accomplishing that mission. Western tradition sees the sacrament as conferred by the canonically expressed mutual consent of the partners in marriage; Eastern and some recent Western theologians not in communion with the see of Rome view the blessing by a priest as constituting the sacramental action.

== Denominational interpretations ==
Many individual Christians and Christian denominations consider themselves "catholic" on the basis, in particular, of apostolic succession. They may be described as falling into five groups:

1. The Catholic Church, also known as the Roman Catholic Church, which sees full communion with the Bishop of Rome as an essential element of Catholicism. Its constituent particular churches, Latin Church and the Eastern Catholic Churches, have distinct and separate jurisdictions, while still being "in union with Rome".
2. Those, like adherents of Eastern Orthodox Church, Oriental Orthodox Churches and the Church of the East, that claim unbroken apostolic succession from the early church and identify themselves as the Catholic Church.
3. Those, such as the Old Catholic, Anglican and some Lutheran and other denominations, that claim unbroken apostolic succession from the early church and see themselves as a constituent part of the church. (Note: Old Catholic, Anglican, and Lutheran movements all have historical ties to the Catholic Church; however, the Catholic Church has judged the succession of Anglican and Lutheran ordinations to be invalid, while giving limited recognition to the validity of the sacraments of some branches of the Old Catholic movement. For further information, see Catholic Church and ecumenism.)
4. Those who claim to be spiritual descendants of the Apostles but have no discernible institutional descent from the historic church and normally do not refer to themselves as catholic.
5. Those who have acknowledged a break in apostolic succession, but have restored it in order to be in full communion with bodies that have maintained the practice. Examples in this category include the Evangelical Lutheran Church in America and the Evangelical Lutheran Church in Canada.

For some confessions listed under category 3, the self-affirmation refers to the belief in the ultimate unity of the universal church under one God and one Savior, rather than in one visibly unified institution (as with category 1, above). In this usage, "catholic" is sometimes written with a lower-case "c". The Western Apostles' Creed and the Nicene Creed, stating "I believe in ... one holy catholic ... church", are recited in worship services. Among some denominations in category 3, "Christian" is substituted for "catholic" in order to denote the doctrine that the Christian Church is, at least ideally, undivided.

Protestant churches each have their own distinctive theological and ecclesiological notions of catholicity.

=== Catholic Church ===
In its Letter on Some Aspects of the Church Understood as Communion, the Congregation for the Doctrine of the Faith stressed the belief that the idea of the universal church as a communion of churches must not be presented as meaning that "every particular Church is a subject complete in itself, and that the universal church is the result of a reciprocal recognition on the part of the particular Churches". It insisted that "the universal Church cannot be conceived as the sum of the particular Churches, or as a federation of particular Churches".

The Catholic Church considers only those in full communion with the Holy See in Rome as Catholics. While recognising the valid episcopates and Eucharist of the Eastern Orthodox Church in most cases, it does not consider Protestant denominations such as Reformed ones to be genuine churches and so uses the term "ecclesial communities" to refer to them. Because the Catholic Church does not consider these denominations to have valid episcopal orders capable of celebrating a valid Eucharist, it does not classify them as churches "in the proper sense".

The Catholic Church's doctrine of infallibility derives from the belief that the authority Jesus gave Peter as head of the church on earth has been passed on to his successors, the popes. Relevant Bible verses include; "And I tell you that you are Peter, and on this rock I will build my church, and the gates of Hades will not overcome it. I will give you the keys of the kingdom of heaven; whatever you bind on earth will be bound in heaven, and whatever you loose on earth will be loosed in heaven."

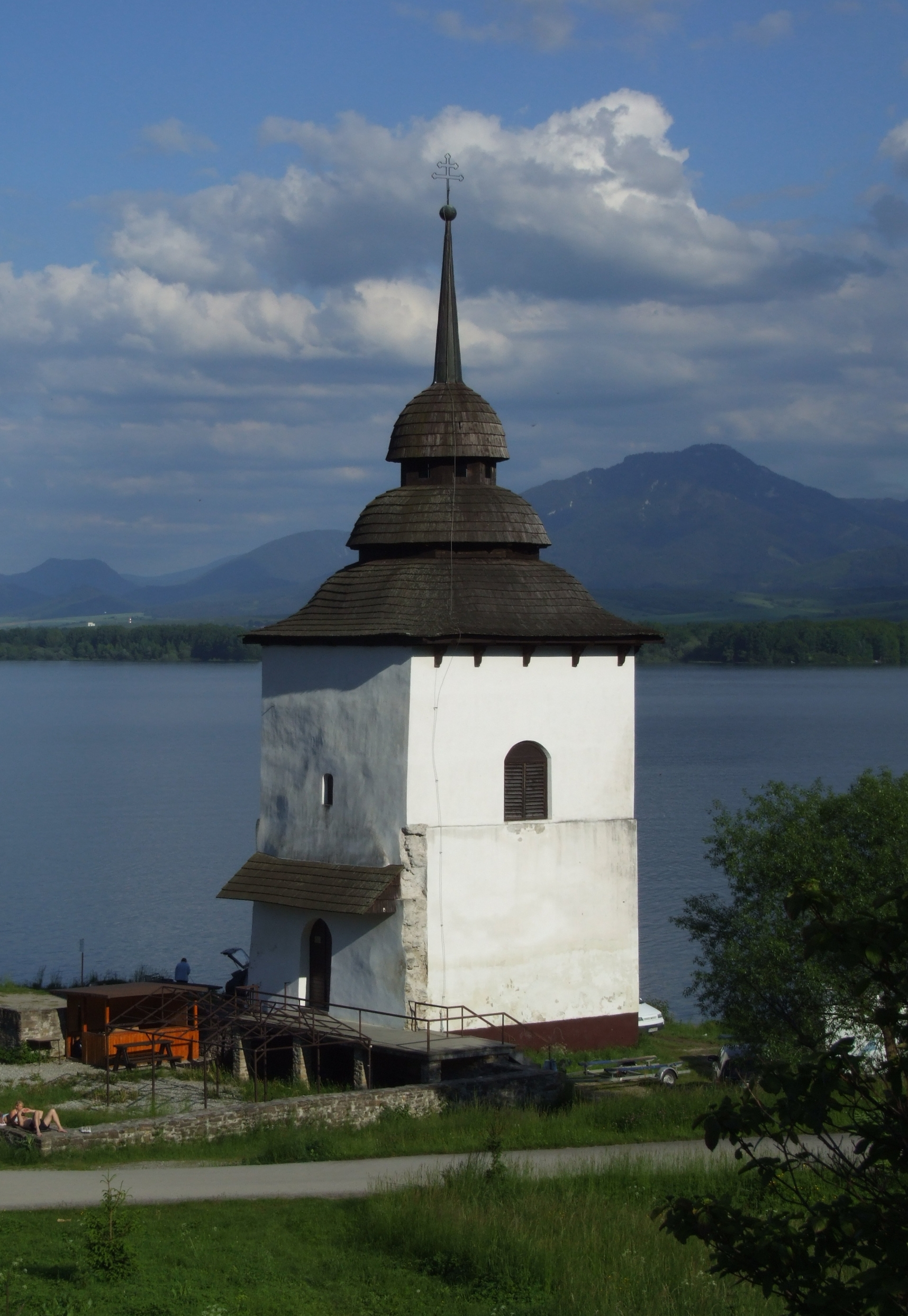
Ruins of a gothic Catholic church in Liptovská Mara (Slovakia)

The Latin and Eastern Catholic Churches together form the "Catholic Church", often called the "Roman Catholic Church", the world's largest single religious body and the largest Christian denomination, as well as its largest Catholic church, comprising over half of all Christians (1.27 billion Christians of 2.1 billion) and nearly one-sixth of the world's population. Richard McBrien would put the proportion even higher, extending it to those who are in communion with the Bishop of Rome only in "degrees". It comprises 24 component "particular Churches" (also called "rites" in the Second Vatican Council's Decree on the Eastern Catholic Churches and in the Code of Canon Law), all of which acknowledge a primacy of jurisdiction of the Bishop of Rome and are in full communion with the Holy See and each other.

These particular churches or component parts are the Latin Church (which uses a number of different liturgical rites, of which the Roman Rite is by far prevalent) and the 23 Eastern Catholic Churches. Of the latter particular churches, 14 use the Byzantine Rite for their liturgy. Within the universal Church, each "particular church", whether Eastern or Western, is of equal dignity. Finally, in its official documents, the Catholic Church, though made up of several particular churches, "continues to refer to itself as the 'Catholic Church'" or, less frequently but consistently, as the 'Roman Catholic Church', owing to its essential link with the Bishop of Rome. (Note: For example, in his encyclical Humani Generis Archived 19 April 2012 at the Wayback Machine, 27–28 Pope Pius XII decried the error of those who denied that they were bound by "the doctrine, explained in Our Encyclical Letter of a few years ago, and based on the Sources of Revelation, which teaches that the Mystical Body of Christ and the Roman Catholic Church are one and the same thing"; and in his Divini illius Magistri Archived 23 September 2010 at the Wayback Machine Pope Pius XI wrote: "In the City of God, the Holy Roman Catholic Church, a good citizen and an upright man are absolutely one and the same thing." On other occasions too, both when signing agreements with other Churches (e.g. that with Patriarch Mar Ignatius Yacoub III of the Syriac Orthodox Church) and in giving talks to various groups (e.g. Benedict XVI in Warsaw), the Popes refer to the Church that they head as the Roman Catholic Church.)

Richard McBrien, in his book Catholicism, disagrees with the synonymous use of "Catholic" and "Roman Catholic":

But is 'Catholic' synonymous with 'Roman Catholic'? And is it accurate to refer to the Roman Catholic Church as simply the 'Roman Church'? The answer to both questions is no. The adjective 'Roman' applies more properly to the diocese, or see, of Rome than to the worldwide Communion of Catholic Churches that is in union with the Bishop of Rome. Indeed, it strikes some Catholics as contradictory to call the Church 'Catholic' and 'Roman' at one and the same time. Eastern-rite Catholics, of whom there are more than twenty million, also find the adjective 'Roman' objectionable. In addition to the Latin, or Roman, tradition, there are seven non-Latin, non-Roman ecclesial traditions: Armenian, Byzantine, Coptic, Ethiopian, East Syriac (Chaldean), West Syriac, and Maronite. Each to the Churches with these non-Latin traditions is as Catholic as the Roman Catholic Church. Thus, not all Catholics are Roman Catholic... [T]o be Catholic—whether Roman or non-Roman—in the ecclesiological sense is to be in full communion with the Bishop of Rome and as such to be an integral part of the Catholic Communion of Churches.

McBrien says that, on an official level, what he calls the "Communion of Catholic Churches" always refers to itself as "The Catholic Church". However, counter examples such as seen above of the term "Roman Catholic Church" being used by popes and departments of the Holy See exist. The Latin Archdiocese of Detroit, for example, lists eight Eastern Catholic churches, each with its own bishop, as having one or more parishes in what is also the territory of the Latin archdiocese, yet each is designated as being in "full communion with the Roman Church".

=== Eastern Orthodox Church ===
The Eastern Orthodox Church maintains the position that it is their communion which actually constitutes the One, Holy, Catholic, and Apostolic Church. Eastern Orthodox Christians consider themselves the heirs of the first-millennium patriarchal structure that developed in the Eastern Church into the model of the pentarchy, recognized by Ecumenical Councils, a theory that "continues to hold sway in official Greek circles to the present day".

Since the theological disputes that occurred from the 9th to 11th centuries, culminating in the final split of 1054, the Eastern Orthodox churches have regarded Rome as a schismatic see that has violated the essential catholicity of the Christian faith by introducing innovations of doctrine (see Filioque). On the other hand, the model of the pentarchy was never fully applied in the Western Church, which preferred the theory of the Primacy of the Bishop of Rome, favoring Ultramontanism over Conciliarism. The title "Patriarch of the West" was rarely used by the popes until the 16th and 17th centuries, and was included in the Annuario Pontificio from 1863 to 2005, being dropped in the following year as never very clear, and having become over history "obsolete and practically unusable".

=== Oriental Orthodoxy ===
The Oriental Orthodox Churches (Coptic, Syriac, Armenian, Ethiopian, Eritrean, Malankaran) also maintain the position that their communion constitutes the One, Holy, Catholic, and Apostolic Church. In this sense, Oriental Orthodoxy upholds its own ancient ecclesiological traditions of apostolicity (apostolic continuity) and catholicity (universality) of the Church.

=== Assyrian Church of the East ===
Similar notion of the catholicity was also maintained in the former Church of the East, with its distinctive theological and ecclesiological characteristics and traditions. That notion was inherited by both of its modern secessions: the Chaldean Catholic Church that is part of the Catholic Church, and the Assyrian Church of the East whose full official name is: The Holy Apostolic Catholic Assyrian Church of the East, along with its off-shot in turn the Ancient Church of the East whose full official name is: The Holy Apostolic Catholic Ancient Church of the East. These churches are using the term catholic in their names in the sense of traditional catholicity. They are not in communion with the Catholic Church.

=== Lutheranism ===
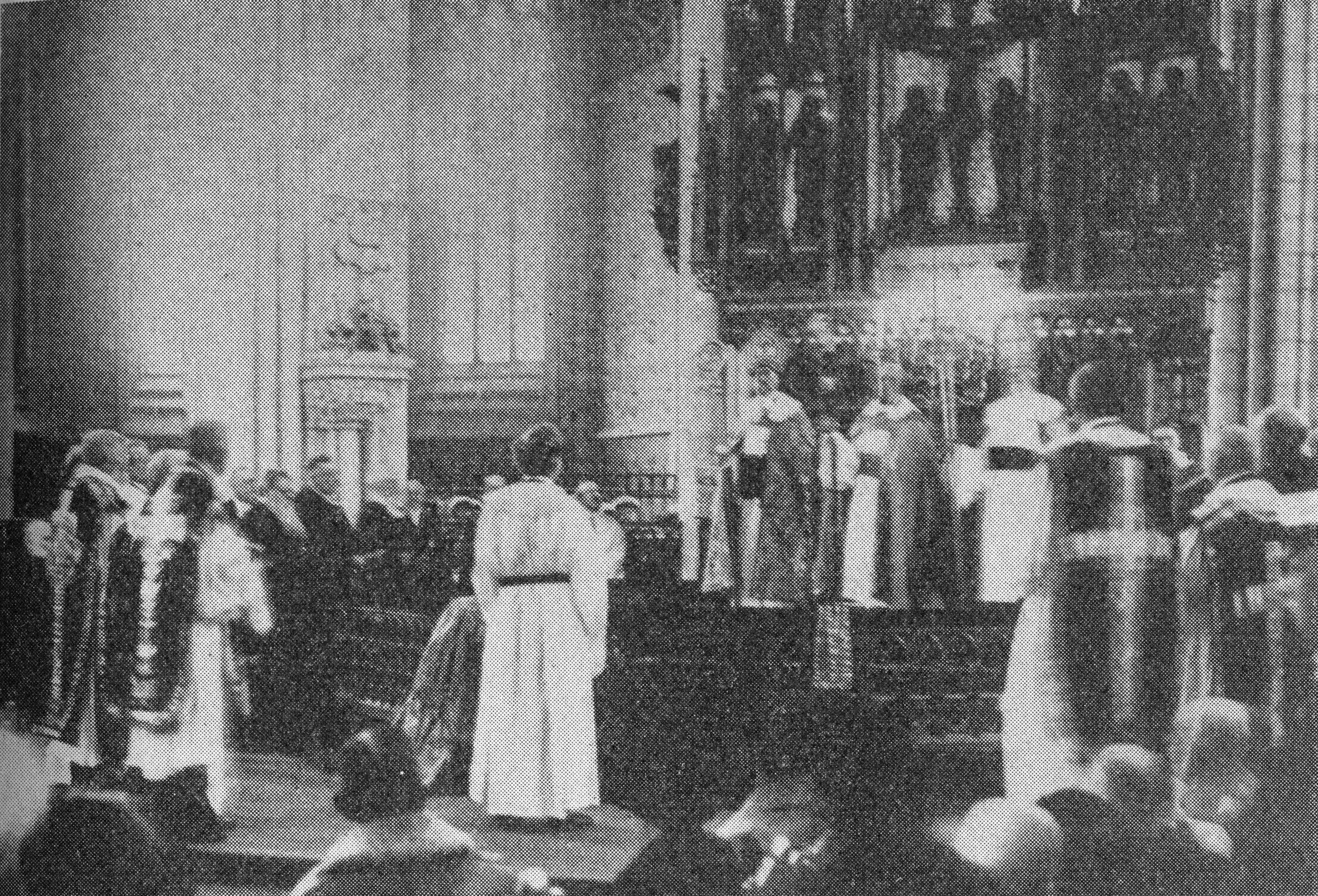
Nathan Söderblom is ordained as archbishop of the Church of Sweden, 1914. Although the Swedish Lutherans can boast of an unbroken line of ordinations going back prior to the Reformation, the bishops of Rome today do not recognize such ordinations as a valid due to the fact they occurred without authorization from the Roman See.

The Augsburg Confession found within the Book of Concord, a compendium of belief of the Lutheran churches, teaches that "the faith as confessed by Luther and his followers is nothing new, but the true catholic faith, and that their churches represent the true catholic or universal church". When the Lutherans presented the Augsburg Confession to Charles V, Holy Roman Emperor in 1530, they believe to have "showed that each article of faith and practice was true first of all to Holy Scripture, and then also to the teaching of the church fathers and the councils".

Following the Reformation, Lutheran churches, such as the Evangelical Lutheran Church of Finland and the Church of Sweden, retained apostolic succession, with former Roman Catholic bishops simply becoming Lutheran and continuing to occupy their chairs. The 20th century movement of High Church Lutheranism championed Evangelical Catholicity, restoring, in some cases, apostolic succession, to Lutheran Churches in Germany where it was lacking.

=== Anglicanism ===
Introductory works on Anglicanism, such as The Study of Anglicanism, typically refer to the character of the Anglican tradition as "Catholic and Reformed", which is in keeping with the understanding of Anglicanism articulated in the Elizabethan Settlement of 1559 and in the works of the earliest standard Anglican divines such as Richard Hooker and Lancelot Andrewes. Yet different strains in Anglicanism, dating back to the English Reformation, have emphasized either the Reformed, Catholic, or "Reformed Catholic" nature of the tradition.

Anglican theology and ecclesiology has thus come to be typically expressed in three distinct, yet sometimes overlapping manifestations: Anglo-Catholicism (often called "high church"), Evangelical Anglicanism (often called "low church"), and Latitudinarianism ("broad church"), whose beliefs and practices fall somewhere between the two. Though all elements within the Anglican Communion recite the same creeds, Evangelical Anglicans generally regard the word catholic in the ideal sense given above. In contrast, Anglo-Catholics regard the communion as a component of the whole Catholic Church, in spiritual and historical union with the Roman Catholic, Old Catholic and several Eastern churches. Broad Church Anglicans tend to maintain a mediating view, or consider the matter one of adiaphora. These Anglicans, for example, have agreed in the Porvoo Agreement to interchangeable ministries and full eucharistic communion with Lutherans.

The Catholic nature or strain of the Anglican tradition is expressed doctrinally, ecumenically (chiefly through organizations such as the Anglican—Roman Catholic International Commission), ecclesiologically (through its episcopal governance and maintenance of the historical episcopate), and in liturgy and piety. The 39 Articles hold that "there are two Sacraments ordained of Christ our Lord in the Gospel, that is to say, Baptism and the Supper of the Lord", and that "those five commonly called Sacraments, that is to say, Confirmation, Penance, Orders, Matrimony, and Extreme Unction, are not to be counted for Sacraments of the Gospel"; some Anglo-Catholics interpret this to mean that there are a total of Seven Sacraments. Many Anglo-Catholics practice Marian devotion, recite the rosary and the angelus, practice eucharistic adoration, and seek the intercession of saints. In terms of liturgy, most Anglicans use candles on the altar or communion table and many churches use incense and bells at the Eucharist, which is amongst the most pronounced Anglo-Catholics referred to by the Latin-derived word "Mass" used in the first prayer book and in the American Prayer Book of 1979. In numerous churches the Eucharist is celebrated facing the altar (often with a tabernacle) by a priest assisted by a deacon and subdeacon. Anglicans believe in the Real presence of Christ in the Eucharist, though Anglo-Catholics interpret this to mean a corporeal presence, rather than a pneumatic presence. Different Eucharistic rites or orders contain different, if not necessarily contradictory, understandings of salvation. For this reason, no single strain or manifestation of Anglicanism can speak for the whole, even in ecumenical statements (as issued, for example, by the Anglican – Roman Catholic International Commission).

The growth of Anglo-Catholicism is strongly associated with the Oxford Movement of the 19th century. Two of its leading lights, John Henry Newman and Henry Edward Manning, both priests, ended up joining the Roman Catholic Church, becoming cardinals. Others, like John Keble, Edward Bouverie Pusey, and Charles Gore became influential figures in Anglicanism. The previous Archbishop of Canterbury, Rowan Williams, is a patron of Affirming Catholicism, a more liberal movement within Catholic Anglicanism. Conservative Catholic groups also exist within the tradition, such as Forward in Faith. There are about 80 million Anglicans in the Anglican Communion, comprising 3.6% of global Christianity.

=== Methodism ===
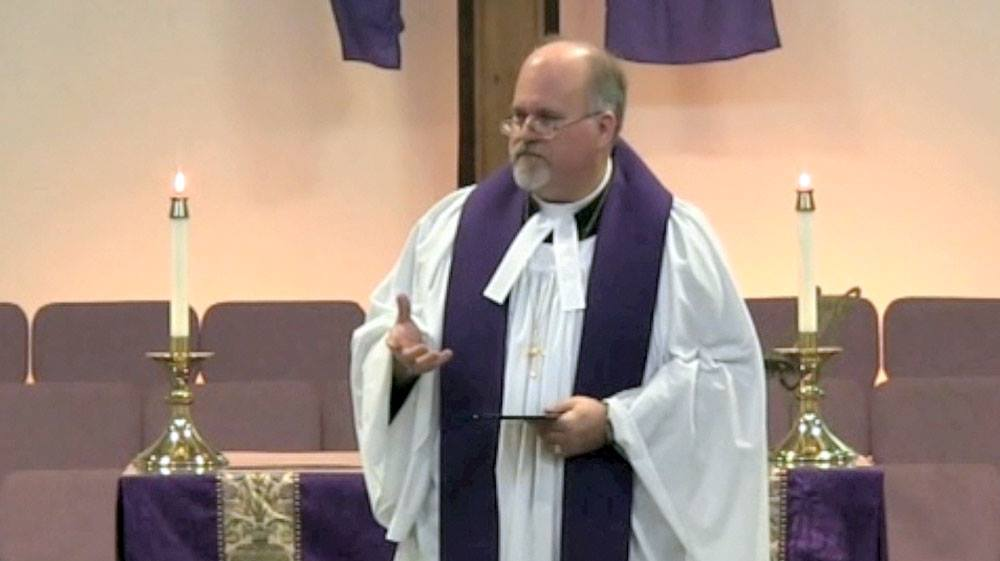
A Methodist minister wearing a cassock, vested with a surplice and stole, with preaching bands attached to his clerical collar

The 1932 Deed of Union of the Methodist Church of Great Britain teaches that:

The Methodist Church claims and cherishes its place in the Holy Catholic Church which is the Body of Christ. It rejoices in the inheritance of the Apostolic Faith and loyally accepts the fundamental principles of the historic creeds and of the Protestant Reformation. It ever remembers that in the providence of God Methodism was raised up to spread Scriptural Holiness through the land by the proclamation of the Evangelical Faith, and declares its unfaltering resolve to be true to its divinely appointed mission. The doctrines of the Evangelical Faith, which Methodism has held from the beginning and still holds, are based upon the divine revelation recorded in the Holy Scriptures. The Methodist Church acknowledges this revelation as the supreme rule of faith and practice. The Methodist Church recognises two sacraments, namely, Baptism and the Lord's Supper, as of divine appointment and of perpetual obligation, of which it is the privilege and duty of members of the Methodist Church to avail themselves.

The theologian Stanley Hauerwas wrote that Methodism "stands centrally in the Catholic tradition" and that "Methodists indeed are even more Catholic than the Anglicans who gave us birth, since Wesley, of blessed memory, held to the Eastern fathers in a more determinative way than did any of the Western churches—Protestant or Catholic."

=== Reformed ===
Within Reformed Christianity the word "catholic" is generally taken in the sense of "universal" and in this sense many leading Protestant denominations identify themselves as part of the catholic church. The puritan Westminster Confession of Faith adopted in 1646 (which remains the Confession of the Church of Scotland) states for example that:

The catholic or universal Church, which is invisible, consists of the whole number of the elect, that have been, are, or shall be gathered into one, under Christ the Head thereof; and is the spouse, the body, the fulness of Him that fills all in all.

The London Confession of the Reformed Baptists repeats this with the emendation "which (with respect to the internal work of the Spirit and truth of grace) may be called invisible". The Church of Scotland's Articles Declaratory begin "The Church of Scotland is part of the Holy Catholic or Universal Church".

In Reformed churches there is a Scoto-Catholic grouping within the Presbyterian Church of Scotland. Such groups point to their churches' continuing adherence to the "Catholic" doctrine of the early Church Councils. The Articles Declaratory of the Constitution of the Church of Scotland of 1921 defines that church legally as "part of the Holy Catholic or Universal Church".

=== Independent Catholicism ===
The Old Catholics, the Liberal Catholic Church, the Augustana Catholic Church, the American National Catholic Church, the Apostolic Catholic Church (ACC), the Aglipayans (Philippine Independent Church), the African Orthodox Church, the Polish National Catholic Church of America, and many Independent Catholic churches, which emerged directly or indirectly from and have a theology and practices which are largely similar to Latin Catholicism, regard themselves as "Catholic" without full communion with the Bishop of Rome, because they generally reject his claimed status and authority. Some Independent Catholics believe that, among bishops, the Bishop of Rome is primus inter pares, and they also believe that conciliarism is a necessary check against ultramontanism.

The Chinese Patriotic Catholic Association, a division of the People's Republic of China's Religious Affairs Bureau which exercises state supervision of mainland China's Catholics, holds a similar position, while it also attempts, as with Buddhists and Protestants, to indoctrinate them and mobilize them in support of the Communist Party's objectives.

=== Other views by individual scholars ===
Richard McBrien considers that the term "Catholicism" refers exclusively and specifically to that "Communion of Catholic Churches" in communion with the Bishop of Rome. According to McBrien, Catholicism is distinguished from other forms of Christianity in its particular understanding and commitment to tradition, the sacraments, the mediation between God, communion, and the See of Rome. According to Bishop Kallistos Ware, the Orthodox Church has these things as well, though the primacy of the See of Rome is only honorific, showing non-jurisdictional respect for the Bishop of Rome as the "first among equals" and "Patriarch of the West". Catholicism, according to McBrien's paradigm, includes a monastic life, religious institutes, a religious appreciation of the arts, a communal understanding of sin and redemption, and missionary activity. (Note: In Richard McBrien's book, Catholicism, he notes (on page 19) that his book was "written in the midst of yet another major crisis in the history of the Roman Catholic Church...." Never once does he indicate in his book that Catholicism refers to churches not in communion with the See of Rome.)

Henry Mills Alden, in Harper's New Monthly Magazine, writes that:

The various Protestant sects can not constitute one church because they have no intercommunion...each Protestant Church, whether Methodist or Baptist or whatever, is in perfect communion with itself everywhere as the Roman Catholic; and in this respect, consequently, the Roman Catholic has no advantage or superiority, except in the point of numbers. As a further necessary consequence, it is plain that the Roman Church is no more Catholic in any sense than a Methodist or a Baptist.

— Henry Mills Alden, Harper's New Monthly Magazine Volume 37, Issues 217–222

As such, according to this viewpoint, "for those who 'belong to the Church', the term Methodist Catholic, or Presbyterian Catholic, or Baptist Catholic, is as proper as the term Roman Catholic." "It simply means that body of Christian believers over the world who agree in their religious views, and accept the same ecclesiastical forms."

== See also ==
- Anti-Catholicism
- De fide Catolica
- Ecumenism
- Ecclesiastical differences between the Catholic Church and the Eastern Orthodox Church
