= Kalogeras =

Kalogeras (Greek: Καλογεράς) is a Greek family name. Like Kalogeropoulos, it is derived from the Greek word καλόγερος (kalógēros: from Ancient Greek καλός (kalos) "good" and γήρας (géras) "old age") for "monk." The genitive case form Kalogera (Καλογερά) is applied to female name bearers. Notable people with this name include:

- Ioannis Kalogeras, Greek army officer and politician
- Nicos Kalogeras, former Chief Commissioner of the Scouts of Greece
- Vassiliki Kalogera (born 1971), Greek astrophysicist

Foreign variants of this surname exist, including in romanized Macedonian Kalogjera, Serbo-Croatian Kalodjera and Kalođera. The Croatian Kalogjeras are a cadet branch of the Calogerà family of Venice, and they achieved prominence on the island of Korčula before settling in other cities across Dalmatia and in Zagreb.

- Marko Kalogjera (1819–1888), Commendatore, Bishop of Split, Makarska, and Kotor
- Marko Kalogjera, first Bishop of the Old Catholic Church in Croatia
- Nikica Kalogjera, Croatian composer and film- and music producer

== See also ==
- Calogerà family
