= Old Catholic Church of Croatia =

- Classification: Old Catholic
- Theology: Ultrajectine
- Governance: Episcopal
- Leader: Maria Kubin
- Associations: International Old Catholic Bishops' Conference
- Region: Croatia
- Headquarters: Zagreb
- Members: c. 700 (2011)
- Official website: http://hrvatska-starokatolicka-crkva.com/

The Old Catholic Church of Croatia or Croatian Old Catholic Church (Croatian: Hrvatska starokatolička crkva) consists of the Croatian parishes in full communion with the Union of Utrecht of the Old Catholic Churches. Since 2018, it is administered by Bishop Maria Kubin. The Croatian Old Catholic Church as of 2017 has about 1,000 believers.

It should not be confused with some alternative organizations of Old Catholic tradition in Croatia, like the Old Catholic General vicariate of St. Method in Croatia.

== History ==
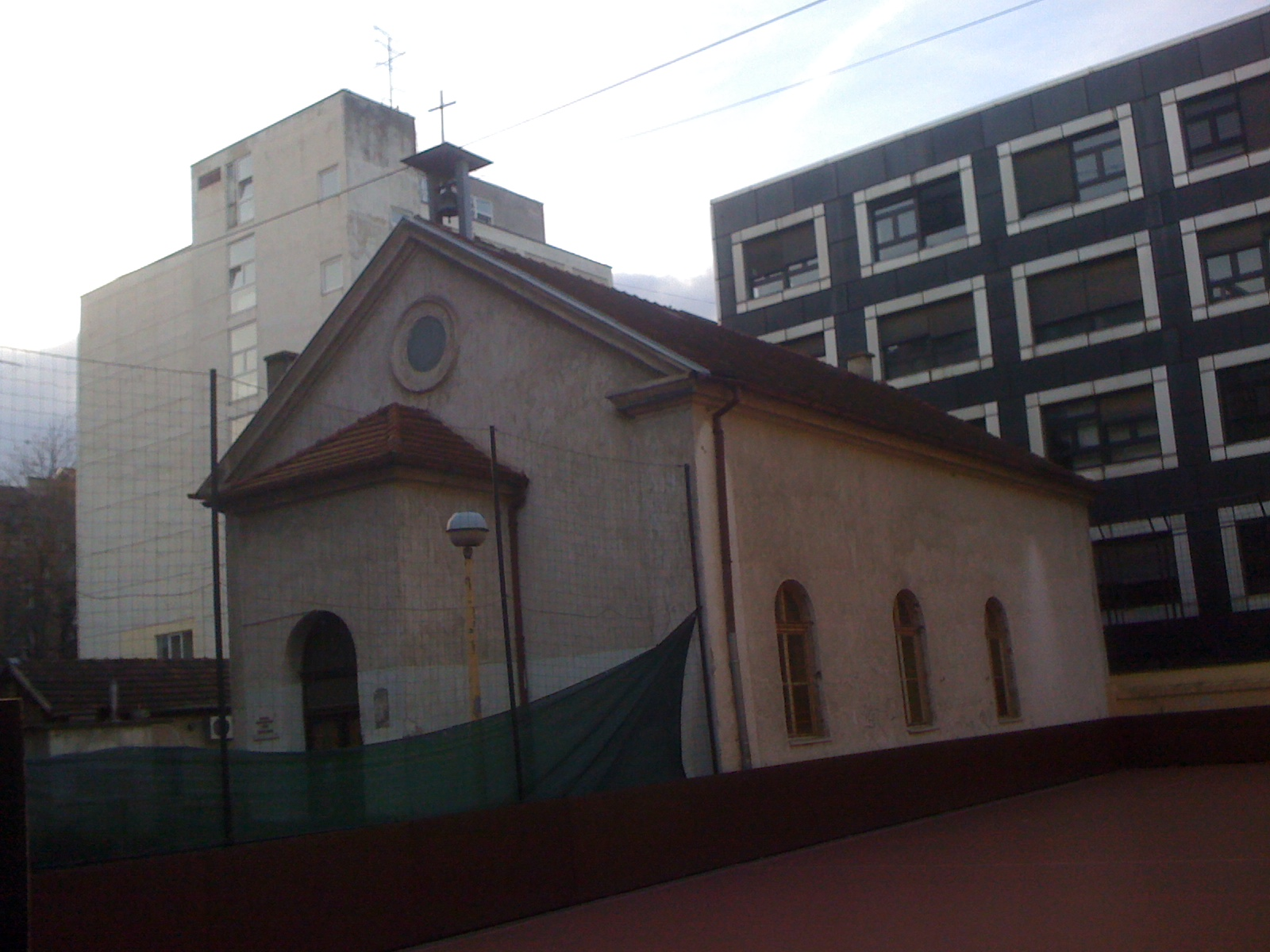
Holy Cross Old Catholic church in Zagreb

The Old Catholic Church in Croatia was created as a result of an unsuccessful attempt to democratize and reform the Catholic Church in Croatia by the Catholic lower clergy in the 1920s. The Old Catholic Church of Croatia was created after First World War and was recognized by state authorities of Kingdom of Serbs, Croats and Slovenes (Yugoslavia) in 1923. Its first bishop was Marko Kalogjera (1924–1956). During Second World War, the Old Catholic Church of Croatia was banned by the Ustaše regime. Among executed Old-Catholic clerics were: Ante Donković, Davorin Ivanović, Josip Ivelić, Ivan Cigula and Luka Malinarić.

The church also suffered from several internal divisions (since 1933), and for a long time it was split in two groups that were finally united in 1974. In spite of that, the church never recovered fully, and it was placed by the Union of Utrecht under a delegated administration of Bishop Nikolaus Hummel of the Old Catholic Church of Austria (1975–1994), and his successors. Since 18 November 2018, the administrating Bishop is Heinz Lederleitner, current bishop of the Old Catholic Church of Austria.

Today's president of the Synodal Council of the Old Catholic Church of Croatia is Dr. Damir Boras, grandson of the founder of the church.

== Croatian Old-Catholic bishops ==
- Marko Kalogjera (1924–1933–1956)
- Ante Donković elected bishop (1933–1943)
- Vladimir Kos (died 1959)
- Vilim Huzjak (1961–1974)

Administrators:

- Nikolaus Hummel (1975–1994)
- Bernhard Heitz (1994–2010)
- John Okoro (2010–2018)
- Heinz Lederleitner (2018–2023)
- Maria Kubin (since 2023)

== Sources ==
- Bajsić, Vjekoslav (1970). "Starokatolička crkva u SFR Jugoslaviji". Vjerske zajednice u Jugoslaviji. Zagreb: Binoza. pp. 38–39.
- Flügel, Christian (2014) [2006]. Die Utrechter Union und die Geschichte ihrer Kirchen (2. ed.). Norderstedt: Books on Demand. ISBN 9783732294374.
- Kalogjera, Marko (1924). Hrvatska starokatolička crkva (1. ed.). Zagreb.
- Kolarić, Juraj (2005). Ekumenska trilogija: Istočni kršćani, pravoslavni, protestanti. Zagreb: Prometej. ISBN 9789536460212.
- Škiljan, Filip (2014). "Starokatolička crkva u Nezavisnoj Državi Hrvatskoj". Historijski zbornik. 67 (1): 195–213.
