= Ošljak =

Ošljak may refer to:

- Ošljak (mountain), a mountain in Kosovo
- Ošljak (island), an inhabited island in Croatia
