= Pandiá Calógeras =

Brazilian politician

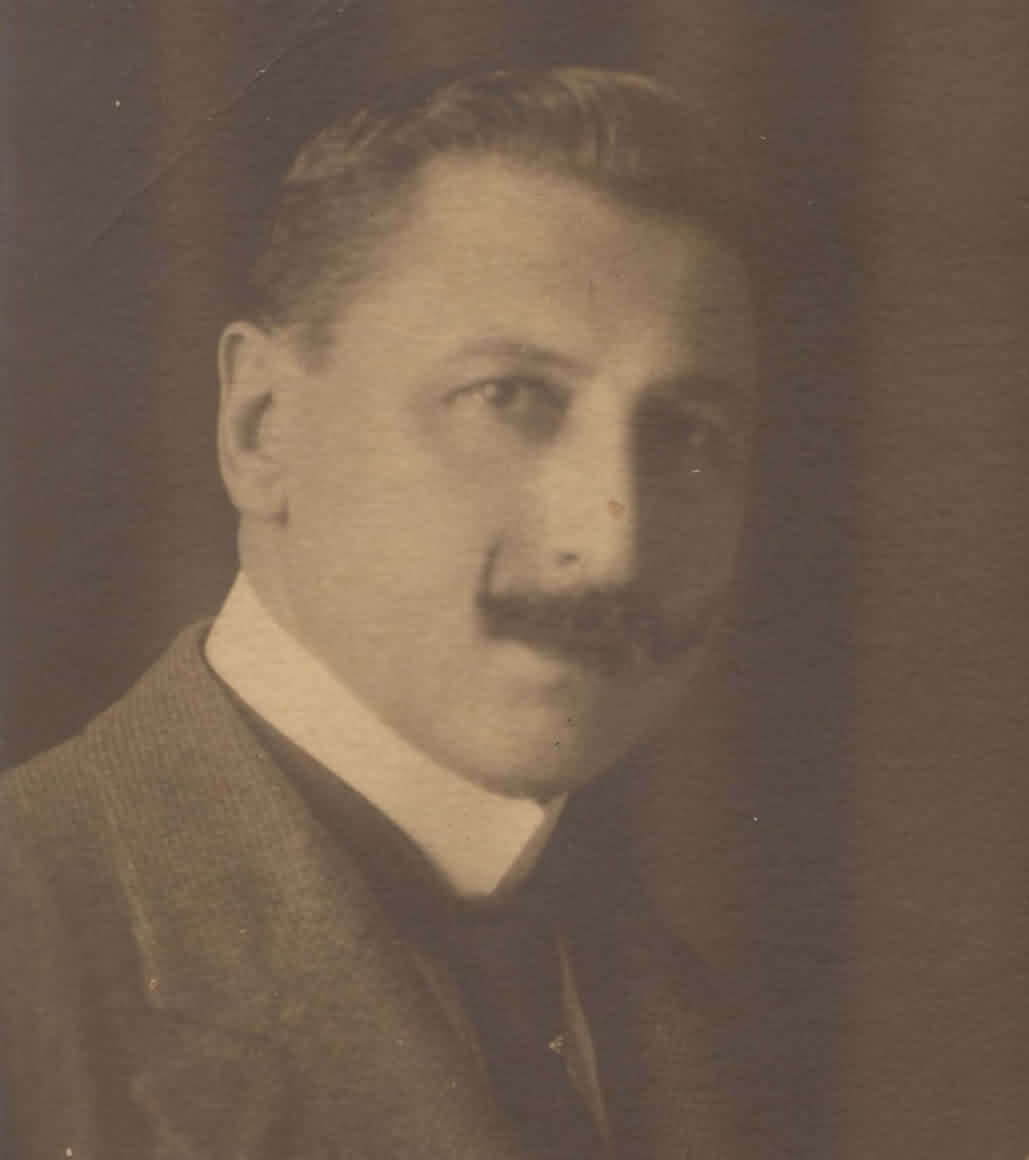
João Pandiá Calógeras.

João Pandiá Calógeras (19 June 1870 – 21 April 1934) was a Brazilian intellectual, historian, and politician. He served as Minister of Agriculture, Commerce and Industry from 1914 to 1915, as Minister of Finance from 1915 to 1917, and as Minister of War from 1919 to 1922. He also took part in the drafting of the 1934 Brazilian Constitution as a member of the Constituent Assembly.

Calógeras's series A política exterior do Império, recounting the development of the diplomacy and foreign policy of the Empire of Brazil, and his 1930 synthesis Formação histórica do Brasil, are his two best known historiographical works.

== Biography ==
A member of the Calogerà family, he was born in Rio de Janeiro to Michel Calógeras, a railway engineer. As a child he was educated by German private tutors and later completed his secondary studies at the Colégio Pedro II, with a diploma in humanities. He then moved to Ouro Preto to enroll at the city's School of Mines, where he studied engineering and geology, graduating first in his class.

In 1891, he married Elisa da Silva Guimarães, the daughter of Supreme Court judge Joaquim Caetano da Silva Guimarães and niece of the poet Bernardo Guimarães. The same year, he was appointed a public engineer for the state of Minas Gerais, where he undertook research on marble deposits in the Iron Quadrangle, and began contributing to scientific journals of Rio de Janeiro. In 1894, he was appointed technical advisor to the Ministry of Agriculture, Commerce and Industry, serving until 1897, when he was elected a federal deputy. During his tenure, he advocated the creation of more public schools, the consolidation of Brazil's borders (as the country was involved in the Pirara dispute), and the lowering of import tariffs.

Following a trip to Europe, during which he presented a conference titled La situation économique du Brésil at the Société de Géographie Commerciale, he published the three-volume series As minas do Brasil e sua legislação, in which he defended the government's right to exploit mineral resources in the country's subsoil. The work, praised by Capistrano de Abreu, inspired the 1915 Calógeras Law, which distinguished between property over land and property over mines, allowing the State to expropriate mineral deposits of its interest.

In 1903, he was reelected as federal deputy for the Mineiro Republican Party, serving until 1914. In 1906, at the invitation of José Paranhos, Baron of Rio Branco, he partook in the III Pan-American Conference, held in Rio de Janeiro, along with Joaquim Nabuco and Graça Aranha. After a period of opposition to the government of Hermes da Fonseca, Calógeras was appointed by Venceslau Brás as Minister of Agriculture, Industry and Commerce. He conducted administrative reforms to the Ministry, streamlining its bureaucracy, and sought to organize a credit system for rural producers.

In June 1915, he became provisional Minister of Finance as the incumbent Sabino Barroso faced health problems. He eventually assumed the position, in which capacity he reestructured the Casa da Moeda do Brasil, later resigning from office after facing heavy criticism from the press. In 1919, Calógeras was part of the Brazilian delegation in the Paris Peace Congress, which produced the Treaty of Versailles.

Upon returning to Brazil, he was appointed Minister of War under Epitácio Pessoa. Calógeras contributed to the reorganization of the Brazilian Army in the Old Republic, inviting the French military mission led by the general Maurice Gamelin. He also helped found the Escola de Aperfeiçoamento de Oficiais, an educational institution responsible for forming high-rank officers.

He was a member of the Brazilian Historic and Geographic Institute.
