= Casato =

Italian legal term with a kinship aspect

Casato is the principle of kinship practiced in early modern Europe. Casato focuses on the vertical lineage passed on from fathers to sons. It is also known as the agnatic perspective. This is different from the opposing term parentado which stresses kinship formation that included the role of women and men. Both casato and parentado coexisted in early modern Italy.

== History ==
In 1684, a prominent Roman jurist by the name of Cardinal Giovanni Battista de Luca published a comment regarding a law previously passed by Pope Innocent XI in 1680. This law sought to exclude women from interstate succession, by upholding municipal law. This was authorized in 187 communities of the Papal state, along with key cities including Florence, Genoa, Milan, Naples, Turin, Pisa, Siena, Lucia, and Mantua.

De Luca's comment brings to light the patrilineal and bilineal view of kinship in early modern Italy. While Roman and municipal law co-existed in Italy's legal pluralism, they differed regarding women and their place regarding inheritance rules. "Although Roman law excluded women from all legal and political positions on the grounds of their inability to act on behalf of others, it did acknowledge their right to own and dispose of property, and gave daughters and sons equal inheritance rights to their father's estate".

The legal condition of women stemmed from late medieval city statutes. Municipal statutes limited women's right to inherit as they receive a dowry at the time of marriage. This sought to set forth a form of male guardianship over all women, particularly their property. Jurists justified their decision to exclude daughters from inheritance by "the preservation of the family, as defined by agnation or the male line".

Agnation and cognation differ in that the former refers to a relation through someone male and the latter to a relation through either gender. Agnation under Roman law never implied women's exclusion from inheritance, but rather specified that a daughter's inheritance rights cam through her father. Once the corpus juris civilis was rediscovered in the 12th century, most cities in Italy passed "laws of their own that excluded women from succession".

== Casato vs. Parentado (agnatic vs. cognatic) ==
The agnatic and cognatic kinship lines are at odds with each other. The agnatic/casato view is the vertical chain of fathers to sons, while parentado/cognatic view is based on relationships which include matrilineal kinship. Thus, the agnatic perspective removed women from the family map, whereas with the cognatic view, women were involved and seen as agents in kinship tie construction (through marital alliances and the exchange of dowries).

It is also imperative to stress that both the agnatic and cognatic views existed simultaneously in Italy from antiquity up to the end of the ancient regime. "The two principles did not represent successive stages in the evolution of kinship but two coexisting ways to think about the family which would be complementary but also in conflict with each other". Casa/casato refers to the agnatic perspective, and parentado refers to the cognatic perspective.

== Women and agnatic lineage ==
Restrictions placed on women were strongest in regards to property. The favored primogeniture and lineage based on agnatic lines (or patrilineage) restricted a woman's right to inherit, and in specific parts of Europe, of dower. Lineage based on the male line, under which the eldest son inherited the majority of the estate, became standard from the 11th and 12th centuries onward. "It was accepted that daughters had a right to a share in the family property, and in many areas the dowry came to be regarded as the daughter's share".

In the 15th centuries, Castilian brides were at times asked to forfeit their rights to the remainder of the family estate once they married and received their dowry. As the provision of a dowry became essential for marriage, patrilineage increased in importance. By the 13th century, the dowry had largely taken the place of brideprice or bridewealth, given by the husband or his family on his marriage.

Dower, the money/property given by the husband to his wife so that she might support herself should she become widowed, became less important and women's right to dispose of property became more limited. Such changes were correlated with a woman's influence and standing in the family, and in society. There were great regional differentiations in the laws on women's inheritance and dower.

In southern Europe, male inheritance was the norm, as it was perpetuated through the influence of the lineage. It was commonplace for the oldest son to inherit the house and other real property, along with the bulk of the estate. A smaller portion was divided among the younger sons, while the daughters received their dowry.

By the early 13th century, similar circumstances were occurring in Spain. At Barcelona, a single male heir who inherited the majority of the family's property was becoming the norm. Nonetheless, daughters still received inheritance from their parents alongside their dowries. The dowry was considered as the "wife's property, although usually administered by the husband".

In England, Scotland, and Wales, women were seen as the weaker sex, both physically and emotionally. These references of women strengthened a patriarchal society. "Being less rational than men, women should submit to the authority of their husbands and masters".

During early modern times, the family was seen as a miniature version of the state. The authority of the king was dependent upon an equivalent recognition of the authority of the husband in the household. It was assumed that patriarchy, hierarchy, and monarchy would both stand together and fall together.

== The Entail ==
During the 14th and 15th centuries, there were attempts to strengthen male inheritance in both southern and northern Europe. Such moves were witnessed among the nobility and strengthened the idea of a family as an empire built on lineage that was centred on a male head of household and embedded "in chivalry and the heroism of its ancestors".

The entail established itself to be a successful means of reinforcing the patrilineage. "By this means, the succession to the estate was legally settled during the father's lifetime, usually on the eldest son, and could not be overturned after his death". In England, members of the higher nobility created entails to guarantee male succession, such as John de Vere, Earl of Oxford. Further, male heirs were also favoured in Ireland and Scotland.
