= Old Catholic Church of Austria =

Christian denomination

Coordinates: 48.2161°N 16.3669°E

- Classification: Catholic
- Governance: Episcopal
- Leader: Maria Kubin
- Associations: International Old Catholic Bishops' Conference
- Region: Austria
- Headquarters: Vienna
- Separated from: Roman Catholic Church
- Congregations: 14
- Members: 4,900 (2021)
- Ministers: 15
- Official website: altkatholiken.at

The Old Catholic Church of Austria (German: Altkatholische Kirche Österreichs) is the Austrian member church of the Union of Utrecht of the Old Catholic Churches. Within the Union of Utrecht, the Old Catholic Church of Austria also has delegated jurisdiction over the Old Catholic Church of Croatia, and other regions of former Yugoslavia.

== History ==
The Old Catholic Church emerged from opposition to the First Vatican Council, one of its foundational positions is the rejection of papal infallibility as defined during that ecumenical council. Recognized since 1877, the Old Catholic Church has no ties to the Roman Catholic church but remains within the Catholic tradition and claims, in effect, to embody its authentic essence.

In early September of 1909, the Old Catholics held a major international convention in Vienna. Among the participants were Old Catholics from Austria, Germany, Holland, and Switzerland. Bishop Eduard Herzog of Bern disagreed with the majority concerning the division of church and state. Whereas they propagated a strict separation, the Swiss bishop Herzog argued that the state had the duty to support the church.

At the beginning of the Third Reich in Austria, the Old Catholic bishop of Austria, Robert Tüchler, reacted "with jubilant joy" at Hitler's entry into the former Alpine republic. On March 14, 1938, the day after the Anschluss, Tüchler sent a telegram in which he expressed his enthusiasm for National Socialism: “The Old Catholic Church of Old Austria welcomes the savior of the homeland with jubilant joy.”

Since 1995, women have been eligible for election as deacons, priests, and bishops and are equal to men in these offices. In addition, laypeople and clergy jointly form the synods.

In 2007, the church elected as its head Bishop John Okoro, a former Roman Catholic priest from Nigeria who had studied in Innsbruck, who had become a member of the Old Catholic Church of Austria in 1999. He retired in 2015, and Heinz Lederleitner was elected at the Synod meeting in Klagenfurt on 24 October 2015 as his successor; he was consecrated in Vienna on 13 February 2016. Following Lederleitner's retirement, Maria Kubin was consecrated as bishop for the church in 2023.

As of 2023, there were approximately 9,000 Old Catholics in Austria, and twelve parishes.

== Old Catholic Bishops of Austria ==
The following bishops have governed the Old Catholic Church in Austria.

- Adalbert Schindelar (1925-1926)
- Robert Tüchler (1928-1942)
- Stefan Török (1948-1972)
- Nikolaus Hummel (1975-1994)
- Bernhard Heitz (1994-2007)
- John Okoro (2008-2015)
- Heinz Lederleitner (2016-2023)
- Maria Kubin (2023-)
