= Maria Kubin =

Maria Christine Luise Kubin (born 26 October 1966, Vienna) is an Austrian theologian and bishop of the Old Catholic Church of Austria.

== Early life and education ==
Kubin was born in Vienna and grew up in a traditionally Roman Catholic family. She became a psychotherapist and worked in the field for approximately 30 years. She converted in 2008 and pursued academic studies in theology. She graduated in Roman Catholic theology from the University of Graz in 2020, and completed a Master's degree in Old Catholic and ecumenical theology at the University of Bonn.

== Ordination and ministry ==
In December 2017, she was ordained a deacon. In May 2019, she was ordained a priest. Prior to her episcopal election she served in the Old Catholic Church, bringing her background as a psychotherapist and her theological education together.

== Election as Bishop ==
On 22 April 2023 she was elected by the Synod of the Old Catholic Church of Austria in the third round of voting. Her consecration as bishop took place on 24 June 2023 at the Gustav Adolf Church in Vienna. She succeeded Heinz Lederleitner, who retired.

Her election and consecration marked a milestone as she is the first woman to be elected and consecrated bishop in the Union of Utrecht of the Old Catholic Churches.
