= Marko Kalogjera =

The Most Reverend His Lordship Monsignor Geheimrat Marko Kalogjera OL
- Bishop of Split & Makarska, Bishop of Kotor
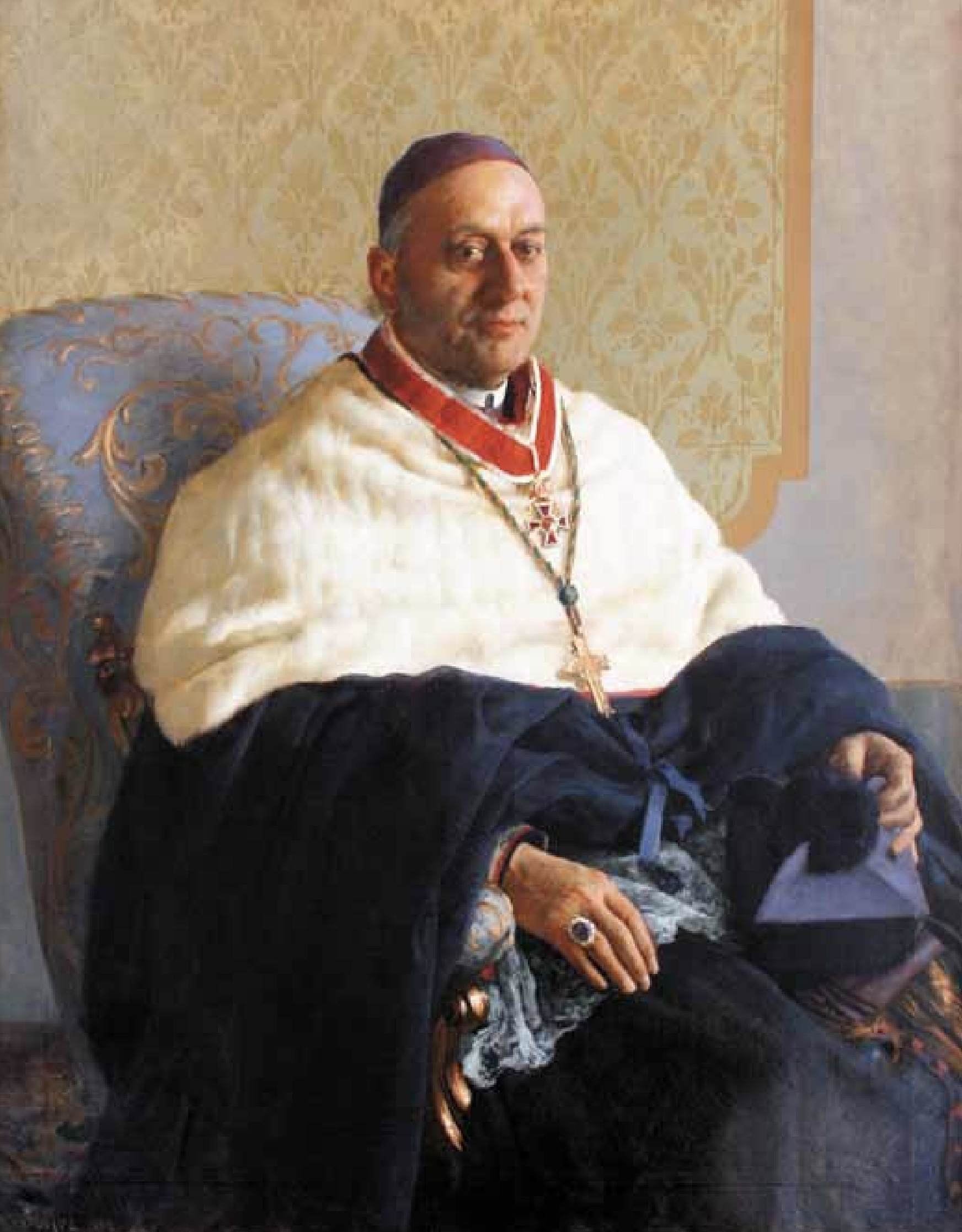
- Portrait of Bishop Marko Kalogjera
- Archdiocese: Zadar (former)
- Diocese: Split-Makarska (archdiocese), Kotor
- Predecessor: Alojzije Marija Pini
- Successor: Filip Frano Nakić

Orders
- Ordination: August 20, 1843
- Consecration: June 19, 1856 by Josip Godeassi

Personal details
- Born: December 7, 1819 Blato, Kingdom of Dalmatia, Austria-Hungary
- Died: December 4, 1888 Split, Kingdom of Dalmatia, Austria-Hungary
- Motto: "In Tempestate Securitas"

Styles of Marko Kalogjera
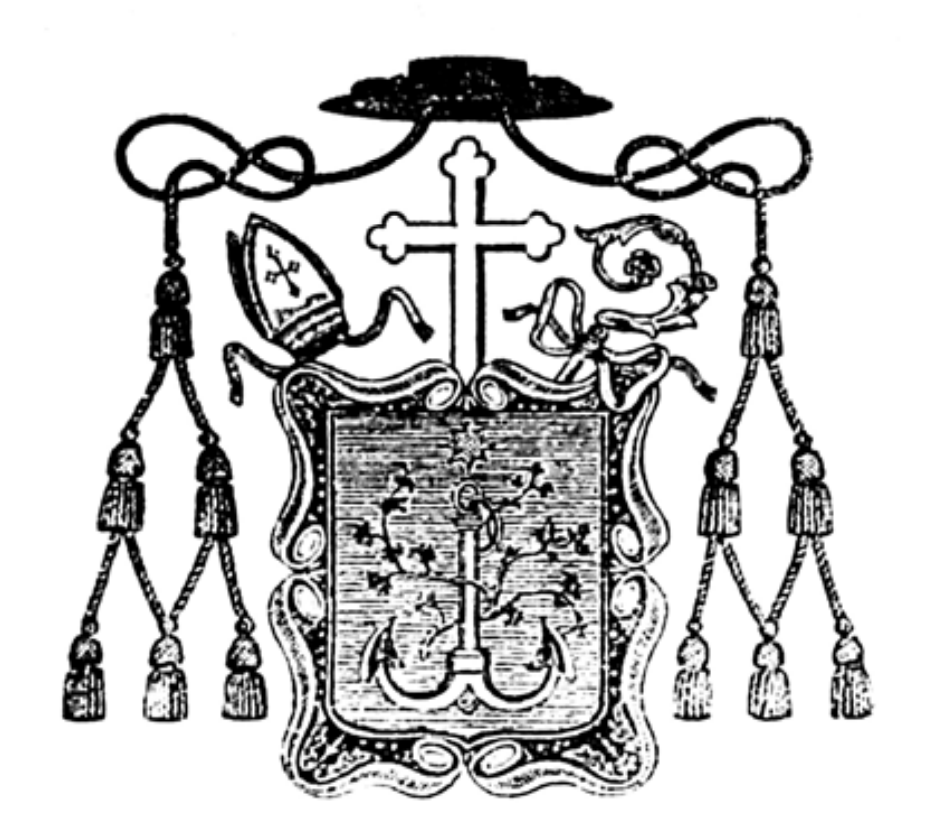
- Reference style: His Excellency; The Most Reverend; His Lordship; Monsignor
- Spoken style: Your Excellency; My Lord Bishop; My Lord
- Religious style: Bishop

Marko Kalogjera OL (December 7, 1819 – December 4, 1888), also known as Monsignor Marco Calogerà or Marco Calogjera, was a priest and Roman Catholic Bishop of Split and Makarska, present-day Croatia, and Kotor, present-day Montenegro. On September 7, 1881, he was awarded the title of Commander (Baron) of the Austrian Imperial Order of Leopold.

== Biography ==
He was ordained on August 27, 1843, and served as chaplain for one year. He later served as chancellor of the Diocese of Dubrovnik for five years. In 1850, he served at the Mandaljena Parish. Between 1850 and 1852, he was Deputy Director of the Dubrovnik Seminary, and he was a professor in Zadar from 1853. In 1856, he was appointed Bishop of Kotor.

In 1869, he was appointed Bishop of Split and Makarska. During his time as bishop, he founded the Bishop's Palace and the Foundation of St. Cyril, where he was instrumental in preserving the ancient Glagolithic script. Kalogjera restored the burial ground and bell tower of St. Duje, built a new seminary in Split, and create the List of the Diocese of Split and Makarska. Many new churches were built in the Diocese of Split during his tenure as bishop.

Kalogjera was very patriotic, and he was friends with Don Mihovil Pavlinovich and Don Franko Bulich. He is credited for his guardianship of Croatian, and he was particularly responsible for the protection of the Glagolitic script and Slavic worship in Dalmatia.

== See also ==
- House of Calogerà
- Roman Catholic Archdiocese of Split-Makarska
- Roman Catholic Diocese of Makarska
- Roman Catholic Diocese of Montenegro
- Glagolitic script

Catholic Church titles
Preceded by Alojzije Marija Pini	Bishop of Split and Makarska; March 12, 1866 – December 4, 1888	Succeeded by Filip Frano Nakić
Preceded by Vinko Zubranić	Bishop of Kotor; January 29, 1856 – March 12, 1866	Succeeded by Djordje Marčić
