= Parentado =

Parentado is a principle of kinship tie that was practiced in early Modern Europe. It is Italian for kin. It suggests power that is gained through the alliance of marriage, along with the exchange of dowries and women (as well as the power and influence a family gains due to these factors). Parentado stresses the key role of women in creating kinship ties. This is markedly different from the opposing term casato (from 'casa' meaning house) which places emphasis on kinship tie that descends from fathers to sons respectively.

== Casato vs Parentado (agnatic vs cognatic) ==
Tension exists between the agnatic and cognatic perspectives of kinship. The agnatic/casato view is the vertical chain of fathers to sons (the patriliny/lignaggio), and the contrary cognatic/ parentado view is based on the horizontal chain which includes affines, cognates, and the kin created through women. Thus the agnatic perspective removed women from the family map, whereas with the cognatic view, women were involved and seen as agents in kinship tie construction (through marital alliances and the exchange of dowries). It is also imperative to stress that both the agnatic and cognatic views existed at the same time throughout the history of Italy beginning from antiquity up to the end of the ancien regime. "The two principles did not represent successive stages in the evolution of kinship but two coexisting ways to think about the family which would be complementary but also in conflict with each other". Hence, casa/casato refers to the agnatic perspective, and parentado refers to the cognatic perspective.

== Parentado and Marriage ==
In early modern times, marriage across Europe was arranged in order to create social and political alliances. Unlike casato which stresses kinship tie between fathers and sons, parentado focuses on the role of women, and how women were essential to kinship tie formation as well. Hence, marriage was one of the ways that women were able to participate in this regard. In this case, marriage depended on whether a new family unit would have the means to survive. Hence, marriage was extraordinarily significant. It was at its very basis a financial, political, and social arrangement which helped to ensure the lineage status through time. As a result, parents did not tend to leave it up to their children to decide. Further, they did not wish to allow the church to exercise absolute authority/control over the validity of the marriage contract either.

With regards to the nobility, marriage took place at a relatively young age. The reason for this was concern regarding the continuity of the lineage as well as the fear of short life expectancies which persuaded parents to strategize for marriage early on in life. Didactic Treatises provided for advice concerning the choice of a wife. "He should take into consideration the girl's beauty, family and wealth". Aside from personal reasons, parents were seen to be looking and seeking a marriage which would improve the family's standing/position (through wealth, property/alliances for future advantages). While parents had high expectations, realism set in. While an advantageous alliance was desired, they were considerate of potential misfortunes.

== Dowries ==
Considerations regarding finance and property were crucial to the formation of marriages. Across all societal levels, families on both sides were expected to make provision in land/money. "The concept that no marriage could be finalized without a dowry, whether the dowry was paid by the family or by the girl itself, held true across Europe". Hence, a substantial amount of the resources of the bride's family was set out for her dowry. "Elite women thus received large dowries which in turn enriched their daughters' marriage possibilities". A medium-sized dowry that was paid was preferable to a large one that was not. The dowry came to be witnessed as incredibly necessary in creating and securing a new household, and in southern Europe particularly, maintaining the future of the bride given the unfortunate circumstance of being made a widow. Hence, the economic foundation was absolutely imperative with regards to marriage. Lack of a dowry was problematic for the poor, and attempts were made to ensure one took place. Also, the rank of the family and wealth were key factors in determining the size of a dowry. While dowries predominately came to be paid in money, property and goods could also be given.

== See also ==
- Casato
- Kinship
- Lineage
- Agnatic
- Cognatic
