= Heinz Lederleitner =

Heinz Lederleitner (born 1958) is an Austrian Old Catholic clergyman who served as bishop of the Old Catholic Church of Austria from 2016 to 2023.

== Life and career ==
Lederleitner is from Vienna. He was ordained a Roman Catholic priest by Cardinal Joseph Ratzinger, later Pope Benedict XVI, and served as a priest of the Archdiocese of Vienna from 1983. He received a doctorate from the Catholic theological faculty of the University of Vienna in 1999.

In 2003 Lederleitner joined the Old Catholic Church. He later became parish priest of the Krems–St. Pölten congregation and head of Old Catholic religious education in Austria.

== Bishop ==
On 24 October 2015 the synod of the Old Catholic Church of Austria, meeting in Klagenfurt, elected Lederleitner bishop on the third ballot, in succession to John Okoro. He was consecrated on 13 February 2016 in the Lutheran City Church in Vienna by Joris Vercammen, Archbishop of Utrecht. On taking office he said that reaching out to people who had left their churches or were searching would be a central task of his episcopate.

Lederleitner held office until 2023 and was succeeded by Maria Kubin, the church's first woman bishop.
