= Ošljak (island) =

Ošljak Otok Ošljak
- Island
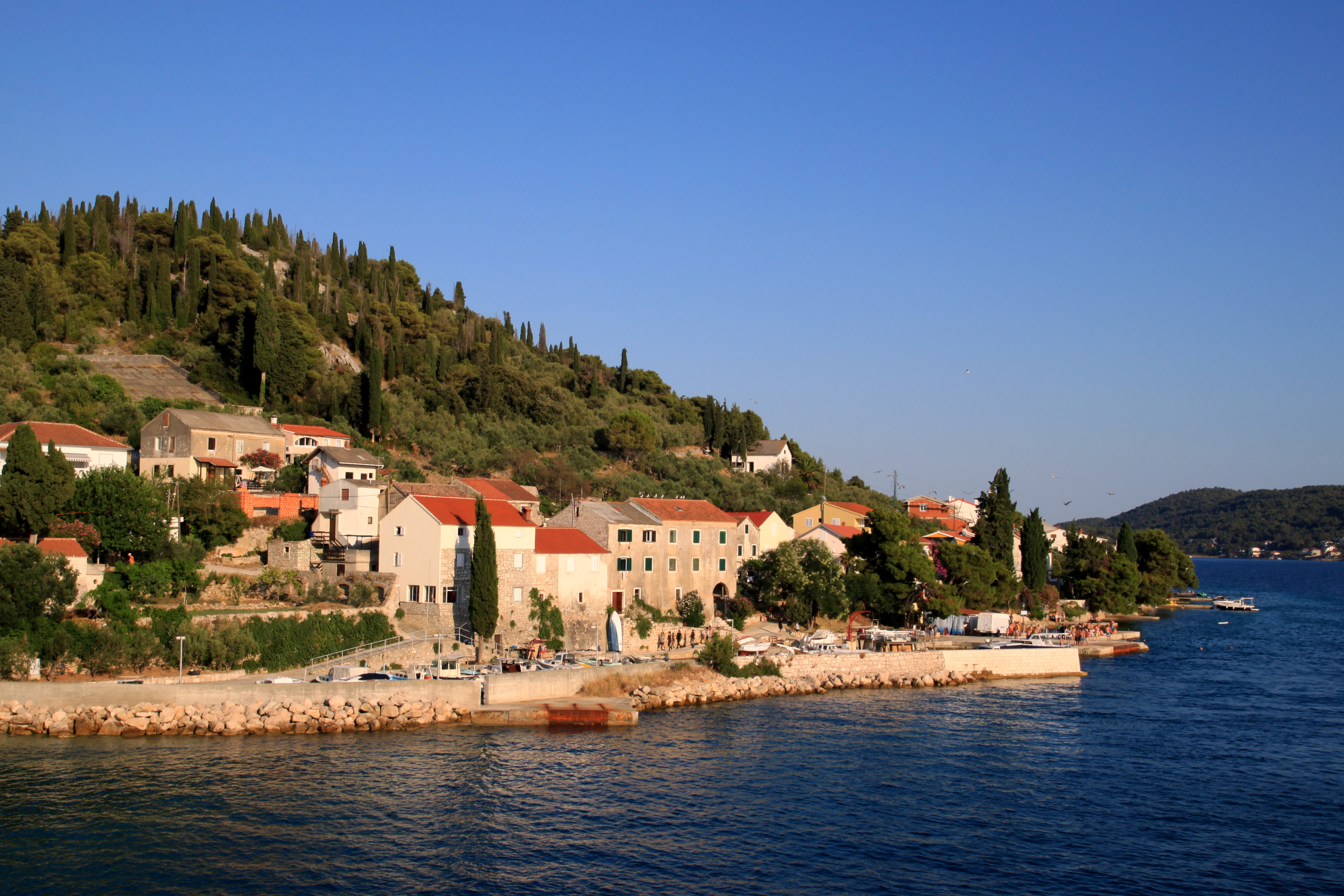
- Settlement on Ošljak
- Interactive map of Ošljak
- Location of the island of Ošljak in Croatia
- Coordinates: 44°04′33″N 15°12′36″E
- Country: Croatia
- Region: Dalmatia
- County: Zadar County

Area
  - Total: 0.3 km^{2} (0.12 sq mi)
- Elevation: 90 m (300 ft)

Population (2021)
  - Total: 35
  - Density: 120/km^{2} (300/sq mi)
- Time zone: UTC+01 (CET)
  - Summer (DST): UTC+02 (CEST)
- Postal code: 23273
- Climate: Cfb

Ošljak is a Croatian island in the Adriatic Sea. Its total area is 0.3 km^{2} (74 acres) and it lies just off the Dalmatian coast between Zadar and the island of Ugljan. According to the 2011 Census, the island's single village, located on the western shore and facing the towns of Kali and Preko on Ugljan, has a resident population of 29 inhabitants, and its highest point, called Lazaret, peaks at 90 m (300 ft). Ošljak used to be called Calugerà, after the noble Calogerà family that had owned the island and built its summer residence and gardens there. On the island is the church of St. Mary from the 6th century.
