= Ioannis Kalogeras =

Greek army officer and politician

- Ιωάννης Καλογεράς
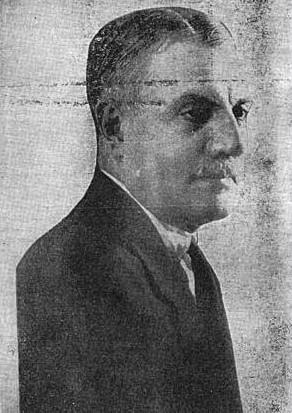
- A photograph of Ioannis Kalogeras

Minister Governor-General of Thrace
- In office 1930–?
- President: Alexandros Zaimis
- Prime Minister: Eleftherios Venizelos

Member of Parliament for Athens
- In office 1923–1930
- Monarch: George II
- President: Pavlos Kountouriotis; Alexandros Zaimis
- Prime Minister: Stylianos Gonatas; Eleftherios Venizelos; Georgios Kafantaris; Alexandros Papanastasiou; Themistoklis Sofoulis; Andreas Michalakopoulos; Theodoros Pangalos; Athanasios Eftaxias; Georgios Kondylis; Alexandros Zaimis

Personal details
- Born: 1876 Spartias, Kingdom of Greece
- Died: 26 July 1957 (aged 80–81) Athens, Kingdom of Greece
- Education: Hellenic Army Academy; École supérieure de guerre

Military service
- Allegiance: Kingdom of Greece
- Branch/service: Hellenic Army
- Rank: Major General
- Unit: 4th Infantry Division; Army of Thrace; Army of Evros
- Battles/wars: Greco-Turkish War (1897); Balkan Wars; First Balkan War; Battle of Sarantaporo; Battle of Bizani; Second Balkan War; Battle of Kilkis-Lachanas; World War I; Macedonian Front; Greco-Turkish War (1919-1922); Occupation of Smyrna; Leonardopoulos–Gargalidis coup d'état attempt

Ioannis Kalogeras (Greek: Ιωάννης Καλογεράς; 1876 – July 26, 1957) was a Hellenic Army officer and politician. He fought in the Greco-Turkish War, the First and the Second Balkan War, and World War I. He served as Minister General-Governor of Thrace and professor at the Hellenic Army Academy.

== Life ==
Kalogeras was born in 1876 in Spartias, a small village of the mountainous area of Trichonis in Aetolia-Acarnania in Greece.

He became a career NCO (non-commissioned officer), and fought in the Greco-Turkish War of 1897 as a sergeant. After studies in the NCO school, he was commissioned an officer as a 2nd lieutenant of artillery. In 1908 he was sent to Crete, to help organize the local militia.

He then went to France for supplementary studies at the École supérieure de guerre. Upon the outbreak of the First Balkan War in 1912, he was recalled from his studies in Paris. During the Balkan Wars he served in the staff of the 4th Infantry Division under Major General Konstantinos Moschopoulos. From this position, he participated in the Battle of Sarantaporo and the drive to Thessaloniki. In December 1912, he suggested to Lieutenant General Konstantinos Sapountzakis, and then to the Crown Prince Constantine the idea of capturing the strategic hill of Tsouka, west of the fortress of Bizani that was blocking the Greek advance towards Ioannina. In the Battle of Bizani, the hill was captured, leading to the liberation on 21 February 1913 of Ioannina. During the Second Balkan War, Kalogeras fought in the Battle of Kilkis-Lachanas.

In 1916, he served as professor of tactics at the Hellenic Military Academy, followed by a staff position in the staff of the III Army Corps. During World War I, he served as chief of staff of an infantry division on the Strymon River front, and later as vice-chief of staff to the General Headquarters in Smyrna in February 1920. In March 1920 he was transferred to the Army of Thrace under Lieutenant General Emmanouil Zymvrakakis.

Following the victory of the royalist opposition in the November 1920 elections, he was placed on leave, and only recalled to active service after the collapse of the Greek front in Asia Minor and the September 1922 Revolution. He helped organize the Army of the Evros, and served as its chief of staff.

He resigned from the Army in August 1923 with the rank of major general, and settled in Athens, where he witnessed the royalist Leonardopoulos-Gargalidis coup attempt. Kalogeras formed a force of 3000 volunteers in Athens, and participated in the suppression of the coup in Macedonia and Epirus. Thus, he contributed to the fall of monarchy and the declaration of the Second Hellenic Republic.

He then entered the political arena, and was elected a Member of Parliament for Athens, a post to which he was continually re-elected until December 1930. In 1930 he became Minister General-Governor of Thrace, contributing to the organisation of Western Thrace.

He died on 26 July 1957.
