= Polish Catholic =

Polish Catholic and Polish Catholic Church may refer to:

- The Catholic Church in Poland, mainstream Catholic Church in Poland
- One of several churches of Polish Old Catholicism, a form of Old Catholicism
  - Polish National Catholic Church (est. ca. 1897), located mainly in the United States, member of the Union of Scranton
  - Polish-Catholic Church in the Republic of Poland, member of the Union of Utrecht
  - Old Catholic Church in Poland (est. 1931)
  - Polish-Catholic Church in United Kingdom (est. 2018)
  - Christ Catholic Church of the Americas and Europe, formerly called Polish Old Catholic Church

== See also ==
- Polish Church (disambiguation)
- Mariavite Church (est. 1906), another Old-Catholic denomination based in Poland
- Catholic Mariavite Church (est. 1935)
- Polish Cathedral style
