= Arthur Wiecinski =

Polish Archbishop (born 1991)

The Most Reverend Artur Robert Wiecinski
- Archbishop
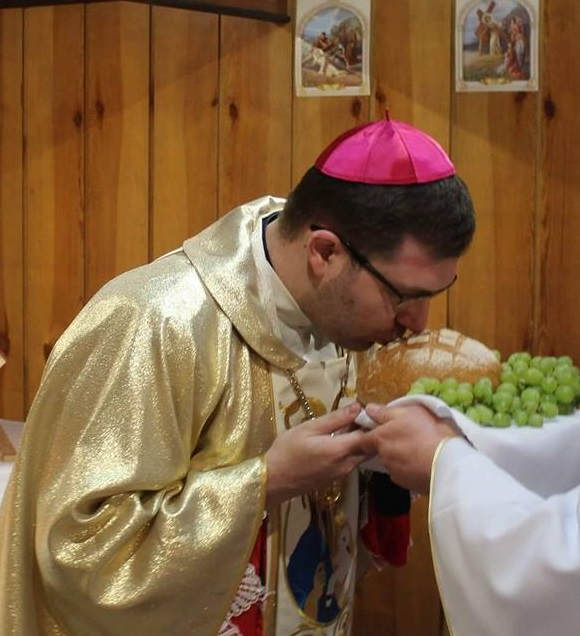
- Church: National Old Catholic Church in Poland
- In office: Jun, 2018

Orders
- Ordination: Apr 17, 2014 by Bp Marek Jan Kordzik
- Consecration: Jul 22, 2017 by Bp Wojciech Zdzislaw Kolm

Personal details
- Born: October 30, 1991 (age 34) Warsaw

Arthur Robert Wiecinski (born 1991) is a Polish Archbishop, prime bishop of the Old Catholic Church in Poland since 14 January 2017, having been elected at the General Synod of the church. He was also Primate of the Polish-Catholic Church in United Kingdom in from April 2018 to May 2019.

== See also ==
- Old Catholic
- Polish Old Catholicism
