= Prüter =

Prüter, also Pruter or Prueter (German pronunciation: [ˈpʁyːtɐ]), is a German last name which possibly derives from a personal name formed with a cognate of Old English prut meaning 'proud'.

== Notable people ==
- Karl Prüter (1920–2007), American Old Catholic bishop
- Robert Pruter (born 1944), sports and music journalist
