= Christ Catholic Church of the Americas and Europe =

The Christ Catholic Church of the Americas and Europe (also called Old Orthodox Catholic Patriarchate of America) was an Old Catholic denomination. The denomination was founded in 1937 when several churches merged.

The denomination has also been called Christ Orthodox Catholic Patriarchate, Byelorussian National Catholic Church, and Orthodox Catholic Patriarchate of America.

== History ==
Several Polish Old Catholic churches and some Lithuanian churches in the state of New Jersey incorporated together and elected bishop Joseph Zielonka as their leader in 1937, thus forming a denomination called the Polish Old Catholic Church. In 1961, at Zielonka's death, the denomination had 22 parishes. It is also possible Zielonka died on December 17, 1960.

After Zielonka's death, Peter A. Zurawetsky, Zielonka's suffragan bishop, succeeded him as the leader of the Polish Old Catholic Church. One of Zurawetsky first acts as leader was to change the name of the denomination to Christ Catholic Church of the Americas and Europe. This name change was done in order to go beyond the denomination's previous ethnic and linguistic limitations and to show that all people were welcome in the denomination. Also, Zurawetsky took the title of "Patriarch in America", and took the religious name Peter II.

In 1965, the denomination had been "reduced to a handful communicants and clergy". It is at this moment that Karl Pruter was consecrated archbishop by Zurawetsky; Pruter had accepted the consecration on the condition that his jurisdiction could be an independent denomination under the name "Christ Catholic Church, Diocese of Boston". Pruter's denomination later became known simply as the Christ Catholic Church.

By the mid-1980s, Zurawetsky had no parish within his jurisdiction, yet he continued to work to expand his denomination. By 1990, Zurawetsky maintained a chapel in Vineland, New Jersey, called the Church of the Visitation. The 8th edition (2009) of Melton's Encyclopedia of American Religions marks the Christ Catholic Church of the Americas and Europe as defunct.

== See also ==
- Lithuanian National Catholic Church
