= Polish Church (disambiguation) =

Polish Church may refer to:

== Organizations ==
- Catholic Church in Poland
- Polish-Catholic Church in the Republic of Poland
- Polish Lutheran Church
- Polish National Catholic Church
- Polish Orthodox Church

== Buildings ==
- Steindamm Church, a former church in Königsberg
- Notre-Dame-de-l'Assomption, Paris, a Polish church in Paris
- Polish Catholic Mission, a mission operating several churches in the Polish diaspora

== See also ==
- Polish Catholic (disambiguation)
- Polish Catholic Church (disambiguation)
