= Andrzej Gontarek =

Polish Old Catholic bishop

- Primate of the Polish-Catholic Church in the Republic of Poland
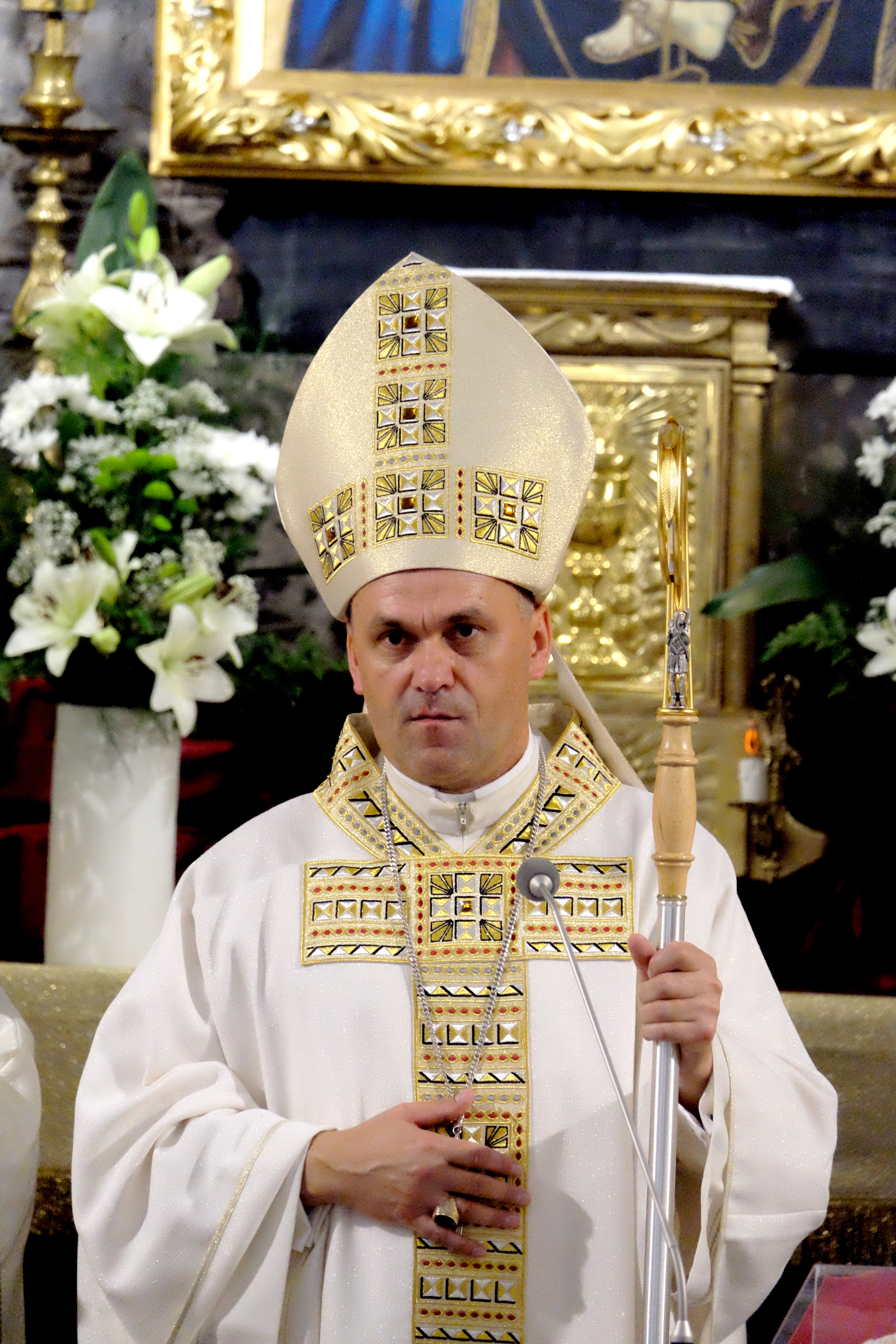
- Church: Polish-Catholic Church in the Republic of Poland
- Diocese: Warsaw
- Installed: June 13, 2023

Orders
- Ordination: May 3, 1997
- Consecration: September 9, 2023 by Dick Schoon

Personal details
- Born: May 10, 1970 (age 56) Głowaczów, Poland
- Denomination: Old Catholicism
- Education: Christian Theological Academy in Warsaw

Andrzej Gontarek (born May 10, 1970, in Głowaczów) is a Polish Old Catholic clergyman and theologian, serving as the bishop of the Warsaw diocese and the primate of the Polish-Catholic Church in the Republic of Poland since 2023.

== Biography ==
In his youth, Gontarek belonged to the Parish of Our Lady of the Assumption and Queen of Peace in Studzianki Pancerne, where he served as an altar boy. He completed his master's studies at the Theological Faculty of the Christian Theological Academy in Warsaw. He also studied at the Christian-Catholic Faculty of Theology at the University of Bern. In 2021, he earned a doctorate from the Christian Theological Academy in Warsaw.

He was ordained a priest on May 3, 1997, in Warsaw by Bishop Wiktor Wysoczański. From 1997 to 2000, he served as an assistant priest at the Cathedral Parish of the Holy Spirit in Warsaw. From 2000 to 2023, he was involved in pastoral work in the Lublin region. He served as the parish priest of the Assumption of the Blessed Virgin Mary Parish in Lublin for many years. He also cared for the Polish Catholic community in Rozkopaczew and, from 2017, administered the Parish of Our Lady of the Angels in Kosarzew-Stróża.

Gontarek is a senior lecturer of the Theological Faculty of the Christian Theological Academy in Warsaw, where he is the head of the Old Catholic Practical Theology Department and the Old Catholic Dogmatic and Moral Theology Department.

He has been actively involved in ecumenism and academic teaching. Since April 2023, he had been the acting ordinary of the Warsaw diocese, the chairman of the Synodal Council, and the primate of the Polish-Catholic Church in the Republic of Poland. On June 13, 2023, he was elected bishop-primate of the church, simultaneously serving as the ordinary of the Warsaw diocese and the chairman of the Synodal Council. He was ordained a bishop on September 9, 2023 in the Polish Catholic Cathedral of St. Mary Magdalene in Wrocław. The main consecrator was Bishop Dick Schoon from the Haarlem diocese of the Old Catholic Church of the Netherlands, and the co-consecrators were Bishop Pavel Benedikt Stránský, head of the Old Catholic Church of the Czech Republic, and Bishop Johannes Okoro, senior bishop of the Old Catholic Church of Austria.

== Family ==
Andrzej Gontarek is married and has two children.
