= Antoni Naumczyk =

- Born: 1925; Nashua, New Hampshire, United States
- Died: April 2, 1969 (aged 44) near Zawoja, Poland
- Occupation: Protonotary apostolic
- Known for: Being administrator of Polish Catholic Church Diocese of Warsaw from 1960 to 1965

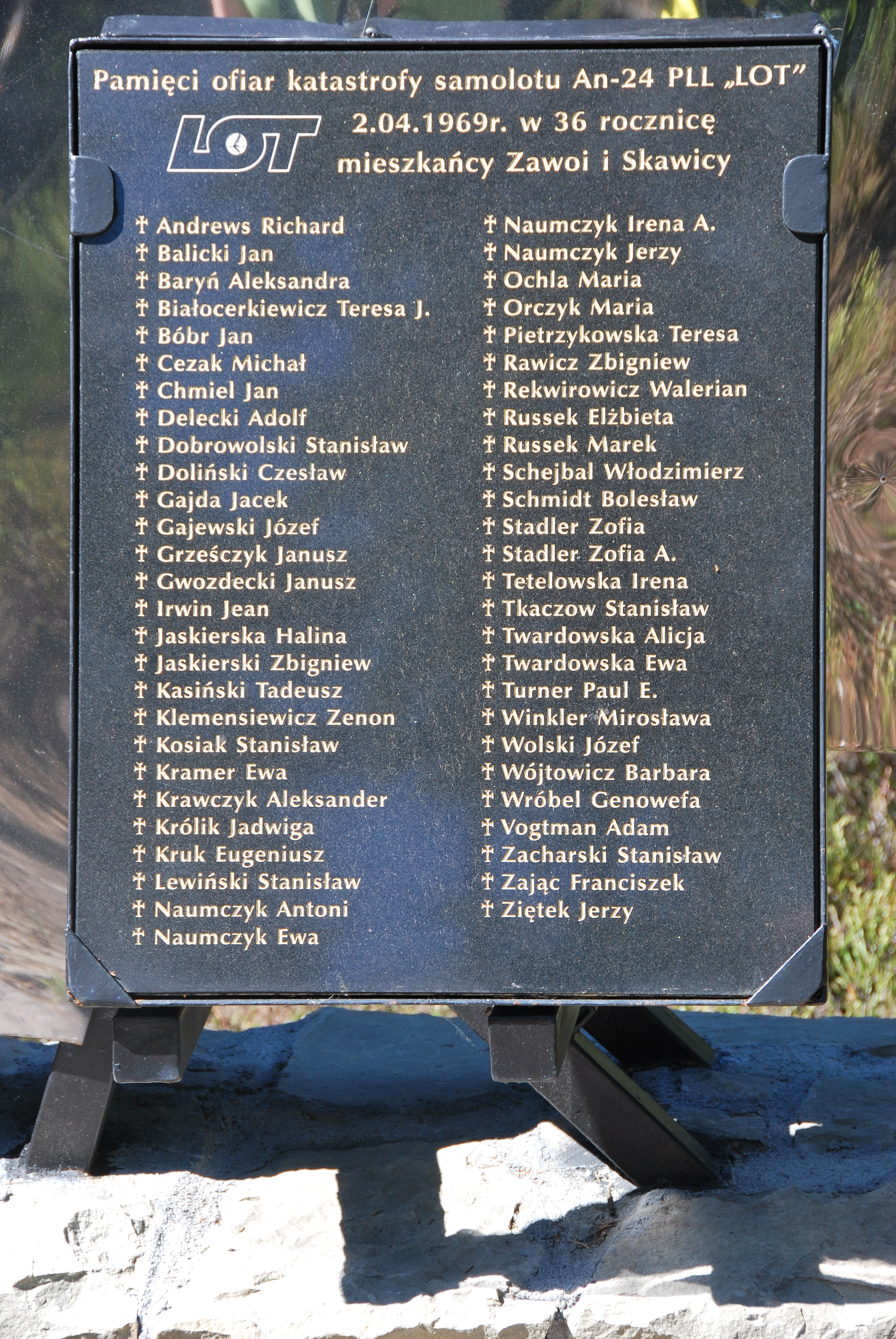
Board on Polica in memorial of the air crash

Antoni Naumczyk (1925 – April 2, 1969), was a priest of the Old Catholic Church in Poland, and general vicar, doctor of theology, and lecturer of the Christian Theology Academy in Warsaw.

== Biography ==
He was born in the United States. In 1929 he came with his parents to Poland and lived in Postawy. In 1945 in Vilnius he passed matura and ascended to Congregation of the Mission. From 1945 to 1950 he studied at the Theology Institute of Priest Missionaries and in the Faculty of Theology on Jagiellonian University.

From 1950 he was a presbyter in the Roman Catholic Church. From 1950 to 1957 he worked as a lecturer at the Theology Institute of Priest Missionaries. In 1953 he received his doctorate of theology from Jagiellonian University.

In 1957 he had to leave the clergy of the Roman Catholic Church, due to exposure of his intimate contacts with women and proof he stole valuable documents from the library of the missionaries cloister in Stradom.

With help of the Office of Confessions he became an Old Catholic priest in 1958 and adjunct of the Christian Theology Academy in Warsaw. He continued his academic career as an Old Catholic theologian. In 1960 he attained the rank of docent. In 1966 he became Chair of the Section of Practical Theology of Christian Theology Academy.

From 1960 to 1965 he was administrator of the Old Catholic Church in Poland's Diocese of Warsaw. In 1965 he was one of the originators in removing Maksymilian Rode from his function as suzerain of the Polish Catholic Church. Naumczyk was typified as his successor, but he denied becoming a bishop, and so Julian Pękala became the bishop. At this time, Naumczyk was protonotary apostolic and vicar of the Polish Catholic Church. From 1965 he was amanuensis of Council and Presidium of Council of the Polish Catholic Church in the Polish People's Republic.

He was considered to be an éminence grise of the Old Catholic Church in Poland from 1965 to 1969. He died with his family (Ewa, Irena and Jerzy Naumczyk) in the crash of an Antonov An-24 on the north slope of Polica.

== See also ==
- Zenon Klemensiewicz
