= Robert Pruter =

American writer (born 1944)

Robert Douglas Pruter
- Born: 1 July 1944 (age 81); United States
- Occupations: Writer, Editor, Reference Librarian
- Years active: 1969–present
- Employer(s): Goldmine, Standard Educational Corporation, Lewis University
- Known for: Soul and R&B music writing, Sports history research
- Notable work: Chicago Soul, Doowop: The Chicago Scene, The Rise of American High School Sports and the Search for Control, 1880-1930, Modern Women and Sports in Interwar Chicago, 1918-1941
- Relatives: Bishop Karl Pruter (father), Steve Goodman (brother-in-law), Daniel Abraham (brother-in-law)
- Awards: Certificate of Excellence, Illinois State Historical Society (1992); ARSC Award for Excellence in Historical Recorded Sound Research (1992, 1997)

Robert Douglas Pruter (born July 1, 1944) is an American writer, mainly on soul and rhythm and blues music, and on sports. He was the rhythm and blues editor of Goldmine magazine from 1985 to 2006.

== Career ==
In 1969, he was hired as an assistant editor on the New Standard Encyclopedia, published by the Standard Educational Corporation. He became associate editor, social sciences, in 1974, and senior editor in 1979. He started writing separately-published articles on soul music in 1976, in outlets including the Chicago Sun-Times and Record Exchanger. He became rhythm and blues editor for Goldmine in 1985, and in all has contributed over 500 articles to journals including the Illinois Entertainer, The Reader, Juke Blues, and Living Blues. He has written liner notes on many soul and R&B musicians, including Jackie Wilson, Gene Chandler, Curtis Mayfield, and Dinah Washington, as well as biographies and overview chapters in reference works including The Marshall Cavendish Illustrated History of Popular Music, The Guinness Encyclopedia of Popular Music, Encyclopædia Britannica (2000 edition), and American National Biography.

Starting in the early 1990s he wrote in journals (in particular Journal of Sport History) and in encyclopedias on the development of sport in the United States, especially on the history of high school sports.

Professionally, he left Standard Educational Corp. in 1996, and worked for Planning/Communications and Charles D. Spencer & Associates before becoming reference librarian at Lewis University, Romeoville, Illinois, from 2001 - 2016. His published books include:

- Chicago Soul, University of Illinois Press, 1991

The book won the Certificate of Excellence for scholarly works from the Illinois State Historical Society, 1992; and the ARSC Award for Excellence In Historical Recorded Sound Research from the Association for Recorded Sound Collections, 1992.

- Blackwell Guide To Soul Recordings (editor), Basil Blackwell Ltd., 1993
- Doowop: The Chicago Scene, University of Illinois Press, 1996

The book won the ARSC Award for Excellence In Historical Recorded Sound Research from the Association for Recorded Sound Collections, 1997.

- The Rise of American High School Sports and the Search for Control, 1880-1930, Syracuse University Press, 2013
- DuPage Roots: Then and Now, (editor with Richard Thompson), DuPage County Historical Society, 2022
- Modern Women and Sports in Interwar Chicago, 1918-1941, Syracuse University Press, 2025

== Personal life ==
Pruter is the son of Bishop Karl Pruter and the brother-in-law of folk singer Steve Goodman and writer Daniel Abraham.
