= John Gritenas =

John Gritenas (born Jonas Gritėnas; 23 June 1884 – 28 December 1928) was bishop of the Lithuanian National Catholic Church (LNCC), a small religious denomination based in Scranton, Pennsylvania.

Gritėnas was born in Vilnius, (then the Russian Empire), the son of Aleksandras Gritenas and Lucya (née Kumorowski). He immigrated to the United States in 1910. He attended the Polish National Catholic Church's Seminary in Scranton and 1914 was ordained as a priest by Father Franciszek Hodur.

In 1920, Gritėnas was appointed pastor of the Scranton parish of the Lithuanian National Catholic Church, and he prepared prayer books and other theological publications. He was consecrated as a bishop by the synod of the Polish National Catholic Church on August 17, 1924. He returned to Lithuania in 1922 and 1927, where he hoped to set up a parish of the American LNCC, but his health began to decline. In 1928, he died of diphtheria.
