= Marek Kordzik =

Polish bishop (1955–2016)

The Most Reverend Marek Kordzik
- Archbishop
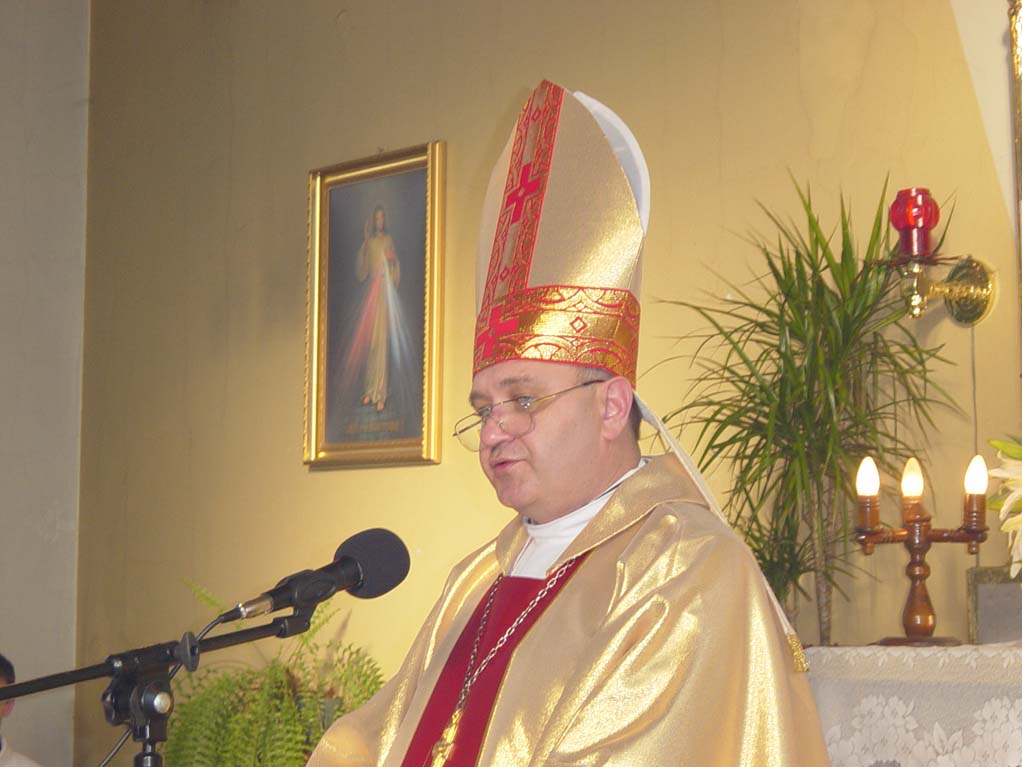
- Church: National Old Catholic Church in Poland
- In office: 2006–2016

Orders
- Ordination: 3 October 1977 by Piotr Filipowicz
- Consecration: 30 March 1983 by Piotr Filipowicz

Personal details
- Born: 1 March 1955 Jelenia Góra
- Died: 10 December 2016 (aged 61) Łódź

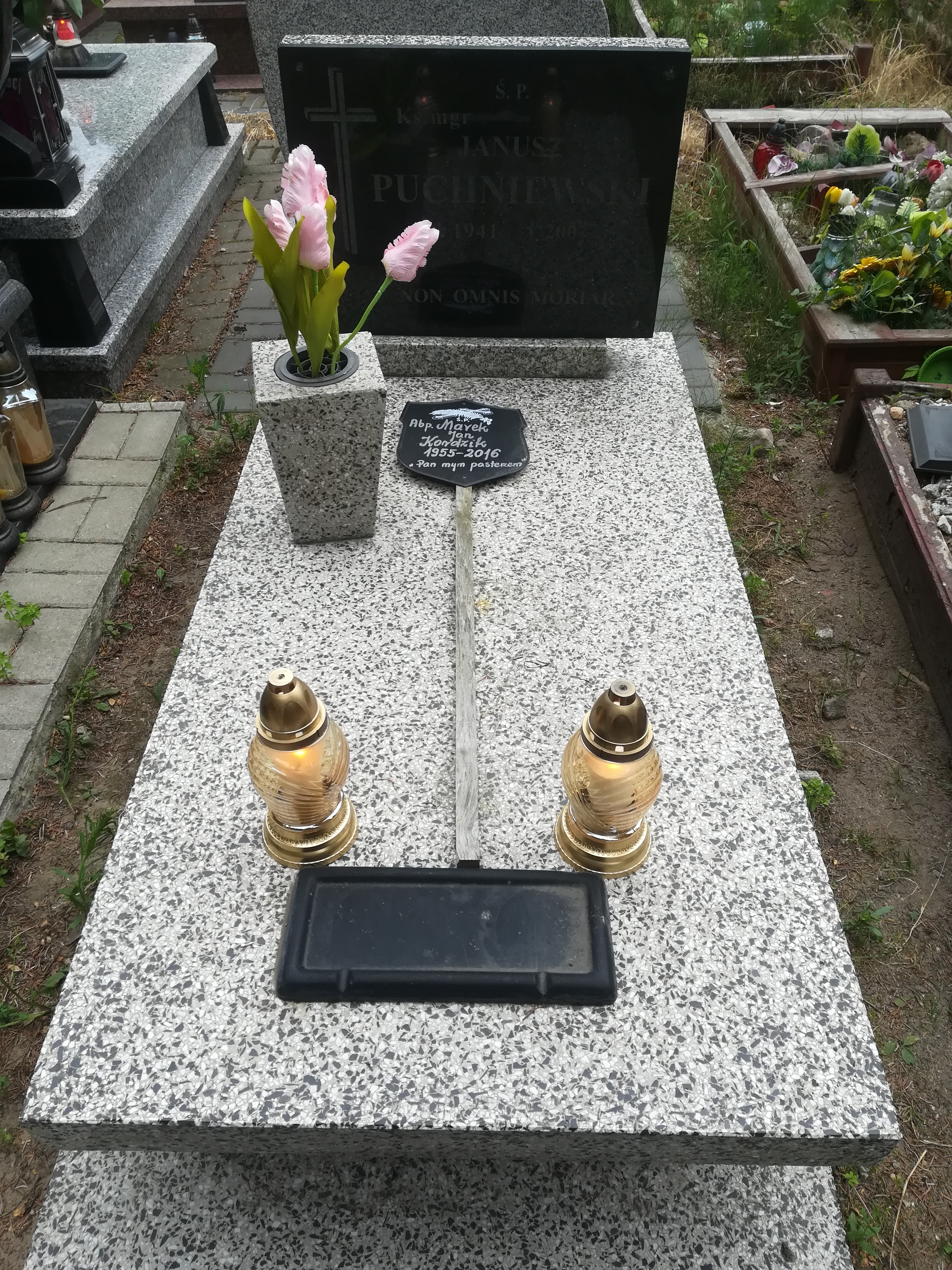
Grave of Kordzik in the Evangelical-Augsburg Cemetery in Łódź

Marek Jan Kordzik (1 March 1955 – 10 December 2016) was a Polish priest and bishop of the Old Catholic Church in Poland from 2006 to his death in 2016.

== Life ==
Kordzik was born on 1 March 1955 in Jelenia Góra. After graduating from high school, he decided to enroll in at the Metropolitan Seminary for the Roman Catholic Archdiocese of Wrocław. In 1977, he joined the Polish Old Catholic Church, and on 4 April 1977, he was ordained a deacon in Wrocław by Archbishop Piotr Filipowicz. On 3 October 1977, he was ordained a priest in Wrocław again by Filipowicz.

On 30 March 1983, during the Extraordinary Synod of the Polish Old Catholic Church, he was elected an auxiliary bishop of the Pomeranian diocese. The date of the episcopal consecration ceremony was shifted many times in fear of being arrested and harassed by the communist security apparatus. Eventually, the ceremony took place on 29 June 1983 in Warsaw. The consecrator was the then head of the Old Catholic Church in the Polish People's Republic, archbishop Piotr Filipowicz, while bishops Jan Kazimierz Banach and Andrzej Rokita served as co-consecrators.

Kordzik spent much of his years as a bishop in Germany, where he performed as pastoral minister in an Old Catholic parish in Hamburg. However, he eventually had to leave because of problems in extending his residence visa. Later he lived in Wojcieszów. From 2000, he was the vicar general of the Old Catholic Church in Poland. On 11 November 2006, Kordzik was elected bishop-head of the Old Catholic Church in the Republic of Poland by the Third National Synod of the Church and officially recognized as the Head of the Old Catholic Church in the Republic of Poland. From 2005 to 2013, he was a pastor of the cathedral parish of the Exaltation of the Holy Cross in Łódź, and in 2013 he moved permanently to Działy Czarnowskie and functioned as a parish priest. In 2016, together with other Old Catholic clergy, he participated in the celebrations of the 200th anniversary of the city of Aleksandrów Łódzki.

On 18 August 2016, Kordzik signed an agreement of mutual recognition and Full communion with Willian Dorea, the archbishop of the Old Catholic Apostolic Church in Brazil. Both churches see the source of their apostolic succession with Bishop Jan Perkowski, who belonged to Bishop Wladyslaw Faron's political sympathizers. Bishop Marek Kordzik was the Primate of the Diocese of the Old Catholic Apostolic Church. Under the agreement, Kordzik was to become the primate of the dioceses of the Old Catholic Apostolic Church - including in Brazil, Cameroon, Congo, Spain and Italy.

Kordzik died of cardiovascular failure on 10 December 2016. A funeral and Christian burial took place on 22 December 2016 at the Evangelical-Augsburg Cemetery on Ogrodowa Street in Łódź.

== See also ==
- Old Catholic
- Polish Old Catholicism
