= Christ Catholic Church =

Old Catholic denomination founded by Karl Pruter in 1965

- Orientation: Independent Old Catholic
- Region: United States
- Founder: Karl Pruter
- Origin: 1965; Boston, Massachusetts

The Christ Catholic Church is an Independent Old Catholic denomination founded by Karl Pruter in 1965.

== History ==
=== Creation ===
The denomination was founded when Pruter founded a congregation in 1965 in Boston, under the authority of the independent Eastern Orthodox Abp. Peter A. Zhurawetsky (1901-1994), head of the Christ Catholic Church of the Americas and Europe.

In 1967, Pruter was consecrated bishop of the Diocese of Boston by Abp. Peter A. Zhurawetsky and Abp. Uladyslau Ryzy-Ryski (the latter was part of the American World Patriarchs). In 1968, Pruter decided his diocese would be independent, and Zhurawetsky agreed.

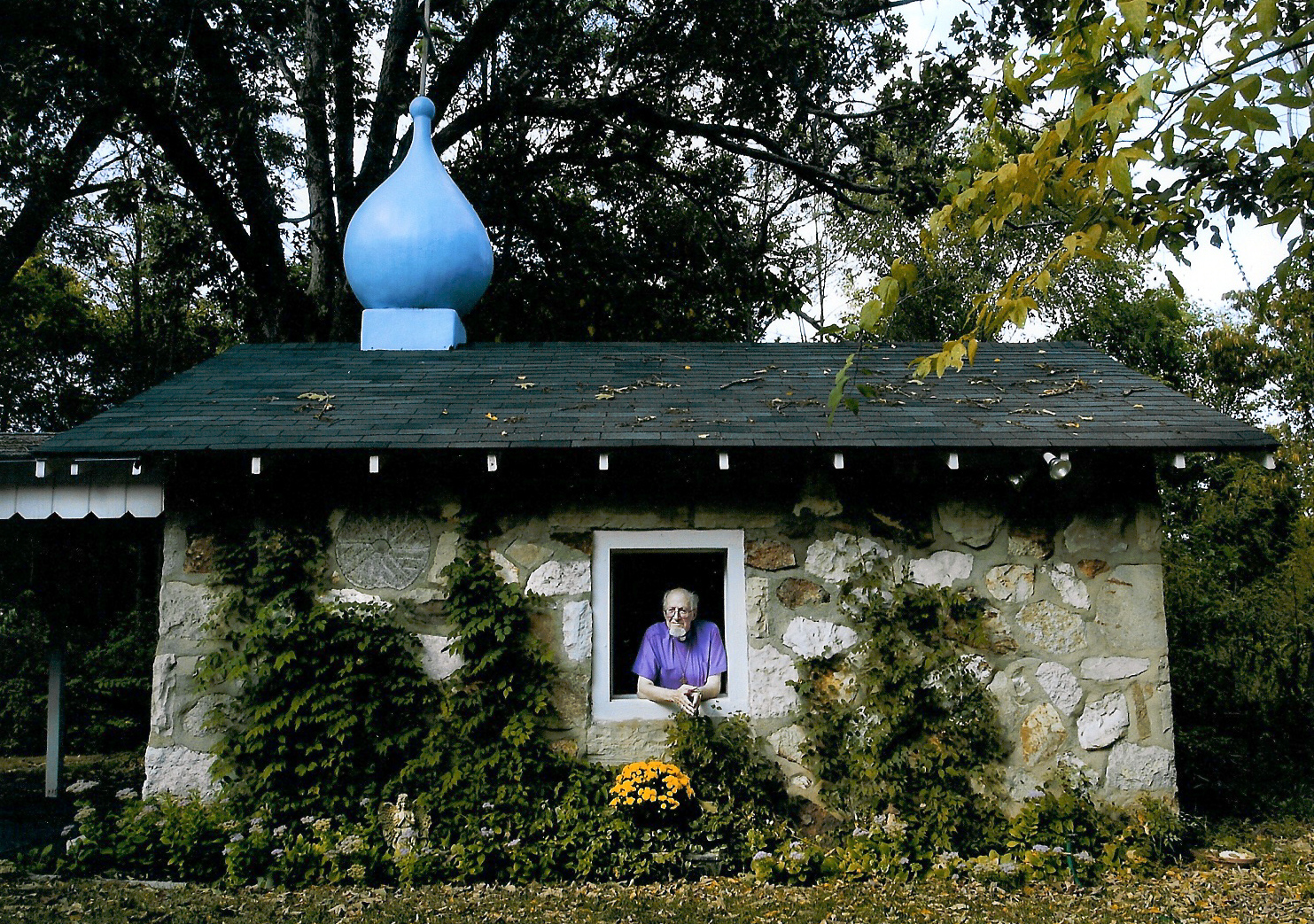
Bishop Karl Pruter and the Cathedral of the Prince of Peace, the Patriarchal Cathedral of the Christ Catholic Church

After this, over the years the denomination, headed by Pruter, moved its headquarters from Boston to New Hampshire, then to Scottsdale in Arizona, then to Chicago, and then finally, in the early 1980s, to Highlandsville in Missouri. In Highlandsville, Pruter was the bishop of a small chapel called the Cathedral Church of the Prince of Peace.

In 1988, Frederick P. Dunleavy was consecrated bishop by Pruter. In 1989, the denomination of which Dunleavy was the head, the Ontario Old Catholic Church, consisting of a single parish, merged into the Christ Catholic Church. In 1991, Dunleavy was elected as the head of the Christ Catholic Church, replacing Pruter.

The denomination was officially incorporated as a 501(c)(3) non-profit organization in November 1990.

=== Merger ===
In 1992, in an optic of expansionism, the Christ Catholic Church and the Liberal Catholic Church of Ontario merged to form the Christ Catholic Church International. The bishop who headed the now merged Liberal Catholic Church of Ontario became the head of the Christ Catholic Church International.

=== Post-merger ===
Thereafter, Pruter, retired, disagreed with some actions done by the new entity. In 1995, he came out of retirement, called for the dissolution of the merger and reorganized some of the former Christ Catholic Church parishes under his leadership as the Christ Catholic Church. Those who disagreed with Pruter remained in the Christ Catholic Church International.

In 2004, the Christ Catholic Church claimed to have about 2000 members and 3 bishops (including Pruter).

Pruter's denomination took the name Christ Catholic Church (Diocese of Boston) in 2006. Pruter died in 2007.

=== Since 2008 ===
In 2008 William Martin Sloane, a priest in the Southern Episcopal Church of the USA, was consecrated a bishop of "Christ Catholic Church (Diocese of Boston)" and of the Southern Episcopal Church. The consecrating bishops were Huron Clay Manning, Jr.; William Harold Corley; Charles George Fry; Robert William Hotes; Richard Melvin Johnson; and Robert Louis O'Block. The board of directors of the Christ Catholic Church (Diocese of Boston) then voted for Sloane to be the CCC/DoB's archbishop and for the "CCC/DoB to function as a diocese of the SEC/USA".

The diocese brings traditional Anglicans and Old Catholics into fellowship together, believing "in the essential unity of all Christians, and the Sacramental unity of those in communion with validly consecrated Bishops of the Apostolic Succession, who teach and practice the Faith of the undivided Church. [...] The work of Christ Catholic Church today is the same as that of the Apostolic Church, to lovingly offer the fullness of Orthodox-Catholic Faith, Worship and Witness to all who would seek Christ and His Kingdom".
