= Lithuanian National Catholic Church =

Lithuanian ethnic parish movement independent from Rome

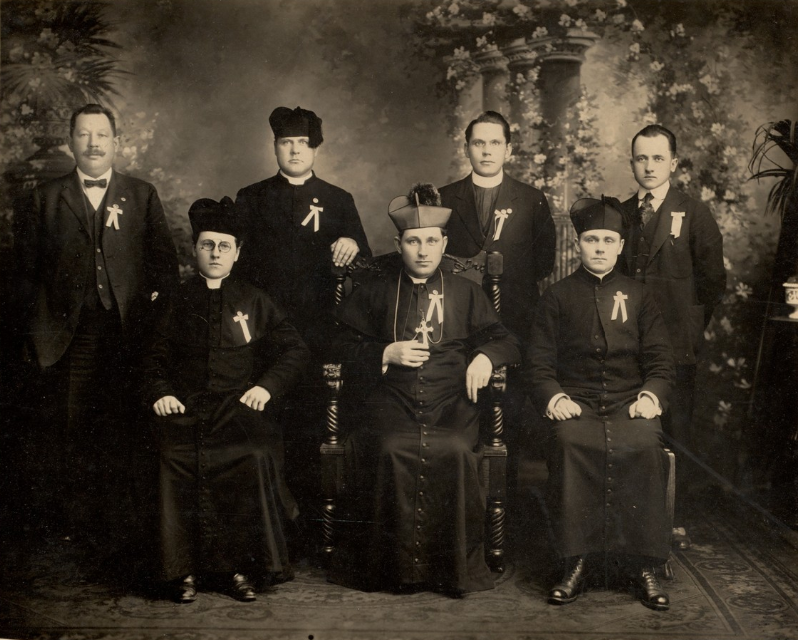
Synod of LNCC in Lawrence, MA, in 1917. Stasys Mickevičius sits in the middle.

The Lithuanian National Catholic Church or LNCC (Lithuanian: Lietuvių tautinė katalikų bažnyčia) was a small American denomination organized in 1914 by dissident Catholic Lithuanian Americans mainly in Pennsylvania, Illinois, and Massachusetts. It was also known as the independent (neprigulminga) Lithuanian church as it rejected the papal authority. It was closely affiliated with the Polish National Catholic Church. The Church established several parishes, but most of them were short lived. The most successful parishes were in Scranton, Pennsylvania, and Lawrence, Massachusetts. John Gritenas was consecrated on August 17, 1924, in Scranton, Pennsylvania, as this church's only bishop. Due to lack of archival sources, available information about the church and its parishes is fragmentary, incomplete, and often contradictory.

== History ==
=== In United States ===
Statistics of LNCC (Data by the U.S. Department of Commerce and Bureau of the Census)
Year	1936	1926	1916
Number of parishes	7^{a}	4^{b}	7^{c}
Congregation members	2,904	1,497	7,343
Sunday schools	5	1	1
Number of teachers	6	3	2
Number of students	316	217	140
^{a} In 1936, there were 4 parishes in PA, 2 in IL, and 1 in MA^{b} In 1926, there were 2 parishes in PA and IL^{c} In 1916, there were 2 parishes in MA, and 1 parish in CT, IL, MI, PA, and RI

The Old Catholic Church separated from the Catholic Church due to disagreements over the resolutions adopted by the First Vatican Council in 1869–1870. The Old Catholic Church was attractive to European immigrants to the United States due to disagreements with the Catholic hierarchy. Immigrants wanted to establish their own parishes where priests would speak their language, but received little support from American bishops who were mainly of Irish and German descent. In 1884, a meeting of American bishops in Baltimore decided that property of parishes belonged not to the community that financed it but to the diocese. Lawsuits between pastors and parishioners over the property were quite common. In protest of such policies, the Polish National Catholic Church (PNCC) was established in 1897.

Due to the historic union between Poland and Lithuania, the Lithuanian National Catholic Church first operated as a section of PNCC. The first Lithuanian priests to join the Old Catholic Church were Vladislovas Dembskis, Vincas R. Dilionis (real name Vincas Petraitis), and Stasys Mickevičius who was ordained to priesthood by Bishop Stephen Kaminski in 1901. The first Lithuanian National Catholic parishes were established by Dilionis in Waterbury, Connecticut, in 1902 and Baltimore, Maryland in 1903, but they – as well as many other similar Lithuanian parishes – were short-lived. Mickevičius established several parishes with the most successful ones in Scranton, Pennsylvania, and Lawrence, Massachusetts. The parishes were established under the jurisdiction of Archbishop Carmel Henry Carfora. When disagreements arose between Mickevičius and Polish bishop Franciszek Hodur, Mickevičius called a synod on July 17, 1917, and separated from PNCC. He was consecrated as bishop by Rudolph de Landas Berghes in 1917. However, Berghes rescinded the consecration in December 1918 once he became better acquainted with Mickevičius. While Mickevičius (died in 1923) was a vocal advocates of separation from PNCC, other Lithuanian priests, including John Gritenas and Mykolas Valadka, were more ambivalent. Gritenas was consecrated as bishop by Franciszek Hodur in 1924. Valandka published a Lithuanian missal of LNCC in 1931.

Another attempt at separating LNCC from PNCC came in 1925 when Steponas A. Geniotis, a student of Mickevičius, called the first synod independent of PNCC in Chicago on May 25, 1925. The second synod took place in Newark in 1932. Geniotis claimed that he was consecrated in 1924 or 1925 (and even elevated to archbishops in 1929), but his claims are doubtful. This group of priests worked with the Catholic Church of America and the St. John's Missionary Fathers of the Catholic Church of America (jonistai). They published several periodicals, including Naujoji era (The New Era; 1928–1930), Jonistų balsas (The Voice of Jonistai; 1942–1952), and bilingual Voice (1953–1964).

LNCC never became popular among Lithuanian Americans as it lacked motivated and energetic priests. It also suffered due to lack of more centralized and organized leadership as well as due to various opportunists who swindled money by claiming to be priests. When Lithuanians migrated to the United States to escape the Soviet occupation in the aftermath of World War II, the new generation of immigrants did not support LNCC.

=== In Lithuania ===
There were some limited attempts at establishing LNCC in Lithuania. Gritenas visited Lithuania in 1922 and 1927. He established contacts with some liberal and patriotic activists who wanted to lessen the influence of the Catholic Church in Lithuania and investigated opportunities of establishing LNCC in Lithuania. During the second visit he met with President Antanas Smetona. These efforts were interrupted by Gritenas' death in 1928, though there is fragmentary evidence that a community of LNCC was active in Rokiškis since 1925. In 1937, Geniotis visited Lithuania and claimed to have established a parish of LNCC in his native village of Repšiai near Mažeikiai. He also held meeting with the Lithuanian press and government ministers and reached out to the leaders of the Eastern Orthodox Church and the Mariavite Church in Lithuania. LNCC received sporadic attention from the Lithuanian press. It received mainly positive coverage from Lietuvos žinios published by the Lithuanian Popular Peasants' Union and more neutral coverage from Trimitas published by the Lithuanian Riflemen's Union. The Catholic periodicals attacked and criticized LNCC due to its ties to PNCC (Poland was viewed negatively by Lithuanian public due to the dispute over the Vilnius Region) and due to behavioral issues of LNCC priests. For example, they referred to Gritenas as a con artist and claimed that he was fined for disorderly conduct while intoxicated.

Any contacts between LNCC and Lithuania were severed during World War II and the subsequent Soviet rule in Lithuania. While the Soviet Union adopted Marxist–Leninist atheism as its official ideology, Soviet officials viewed an autocephalous "national church" as a tool to weaken the Catholic Church. KGB sought to recruit priests for a "national church" in Lithuania as early as 1946. They managed to recruit Juozas Pilypaitis, a priest from Sudargas, but his open letter published in a regional newspaper remained unnoticed by the Lithuanian society. When Pope Pius XII issued a decree excommunicating collaborators with communists in July 1949, Soviet officials attempted to force Lithuanian priests sign a protest letter and use it as the basis for establishing the national church. The effort did not gain a momentum – only 108 priests out of 933 signed the letter – and the idea of the national church was abandoned in favor of other methods of persecution of Christians.

== Ideology ==
LNCC did not develop a more distinct identity or mission – it was a rival of the traditional Catholic Church, but offered only "bureaucratic" differences (i.e. rejection of papal authority and adoption of a more democratic parish governance) without altering the underlying religious dogmas. LNCC tried to combine two contradictory attributes – Catholic (which means "universal") and national (which means "specific to one nation"). The church practiced both individual and communal confessions and criticized clerical celibacy, but did not develop its own coherent dogmatic theology or apologetics. Many writing of LNCC were focused on attacking and criticizing the traditional Catholic Church. LNCC combined Catholic faith with Lithuanian nationalism and patriotism. LNCC conducted the masses in Lithuanian, but that turned out to be a disadvantage in the long-run as immigrants increasingly adopted the English language. Some of its texts show influence of Calvinism and Jansenism.

== Parishes ==
=== Scranton, PA ===
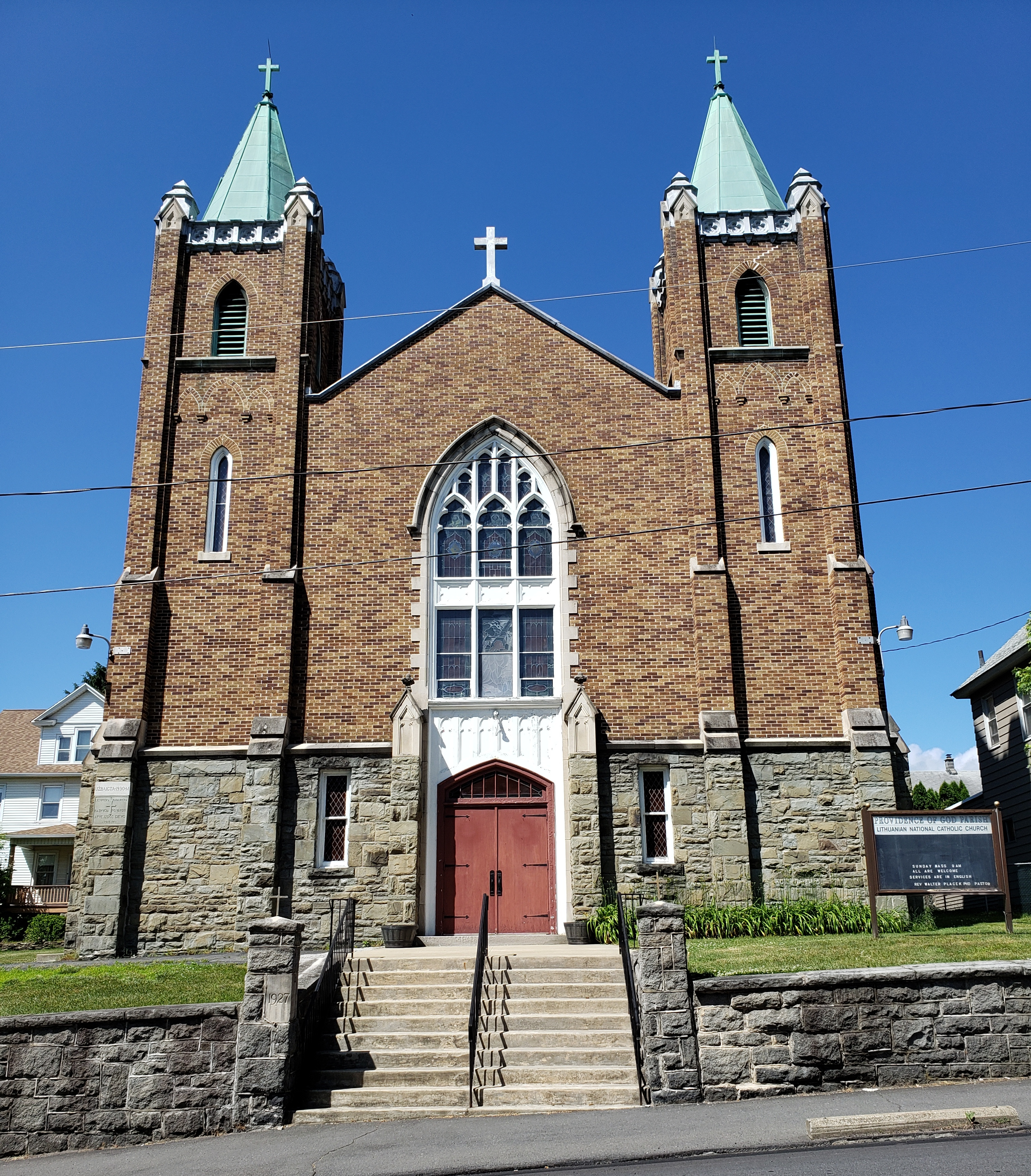
Lithuanian National Catholic Church in Scranton

Lithuanians in Scranton, Pennsylvania, feuded with their priest of the St. Joseph parish and Bishop of Scranton since 1895. In 1910, when a court decided that the church and other parish property was in a trust and not outright owned by the bishop, the bishop, Michael John Hoban, excommunicated the parish committee and closed the Church of St. Joseph. The LNCC parish of the Providence of God in Scranton was established by Stasys B. Mickevičius in 1913 and continues to operate. Scranton was also the stronghold of PNCC. The parishioners collected funds and purchased two plots of land, one for the church and the other for the cemetery. A temporary church was erected in 1915. Mickevičius left the parish in 1916. It became more active when it was taken over by bishop Jonas Gritėnas in 1919–1928. The parish purchased a 100-acre (40 ha) farm, established a shelter for the elderly (named after Vilnius; established in 1924 and closed after Gritėnas' death in 1928 due to financial difficulties), built a clergy house and a hall for parish events (named after Grand Duke Vytautas). Gritėnas also organized a short-lived priest seminary. At the time, the parishioners numbered about 300 families. They organized various events, including frequent picnics in a park behind the cemetery. Gritėnas was replaced by Mykolas Valadka who arrived from Uruguay in 1929 and continued to work at the parish until 1972. He was one of the leaders of LNCC and worked with other parishes as well, including working to establish a parish in Wilkes-Barre, PA. During his tenure, the parish in Scranton built its own church in 1930 which put the parish into long-term debt. The parish also had a Sunday school with children's theater and a choir which sang in Lithuanian even though some members were third generation immigrants. After his death, the parish priests were of Polish origin: Edward Ratajack (1974–1984), Jerzy Urbanski (1983–1987), L. Lazarski (1987–1990), Stanislaus Stryz (1990–2002), Walter Placek (since 2002).

=== Lawrence, MA ===
The Sacred Heart parish in Lawrence, Massachusetts, was established by Stasys B. Mickevičius in 1916. He exploited the disagreements between pastor Antanas Jusaitis and the congregation of the Catholic parish of St. Francis. He worked in the parish until 1918. In November 1917, the parish began publishing a monthly newspaper Atgimimas (Rebirth), edited by Kostantinas Norkus, but it lasted only seven months. The parish purchased a brick church, clergy house, a park in which it established a cemetery and which was also used for picnics. Mickevičius established a priest seminary which prepared Steponas A. Geniotis, Stasys Šleinys, Žvalionis and S. Tautas for priesthood. In 1918, he was replaced by Stasys Šleinys who died in 1927. Šleinys was not very liked and there were lawsuits between him and the parishioners over the cemetery. The parish had a choir which also staged amateur performances of operettas, dramas, etc. In 1933, the choir had about 70 members. When Mykolas Valadka (1932–1936) was the parish priest, it attempted to reestablish its newspaper as Tautos balsas (The Voice of the Nation; 1931–1932) and Tiesos balsas (The Voice of the Truth; only four issues appeared in 1933). Valadka also purchased a 100-acre (40 ha) farm with 30 milk cows and established a shelter for the elderly. The farm was sold when Valadka moved to Scranton. The parish continued to function until 2002.

=== Other known parishes ===
Location	Parish	Known priests	Period active
Waterbury, CT	All Saints	Vincas R. Dilionis	1902
Chicago, IL (Town of Lake)		Petras B. Urbonas	1913
Chicago, IL (Town of Lake)	St. Peter the Apostle	Zigmas Jankauskas	1914
Chicago, IL (Bridgeport)		Stasys B. Mickevičius	1916, 1921–1923
Chicago, IL		J. A. Bukauskas	1919
Chicago, IL	Our Lady of Šiluva	Stasys B. Mickevičius; S. A. Linkus	1921–1923, 1931–?
Westville, IL	Holy Cross	Zigmantas K. Vipartas; F. A. Mikalauskas	1914/1915–1933
Springfield, IL			1948
Baltimore, MD		Vincas R. Dilionis	1903
Athol, MA		Stasys B. Mickevičius	1908
Worcester, MA		Stasys B. Mickevičius	1910–1914
Newark, NJ		Krikščiūnas	1922
Du Bois, PA		Petras B. Urbonas	1903–1909
Pittsburgh, PA	St. George	Zigmantas K. Vipartas	1922–1933
Philadelphia, PA	St. Mary	Ksaveras M. Žukauskas	1926–1957
Wilkes-Barre, PA	All Saints	Mykolas Valadka	1929/1931–1933, 1946
Shenandoah, PA	St. Joseph		1931/1933, 1940
Providence, RI	St. John (?)	Stasys B. Mickevičius	1907–1912
Note: due to fragmentary information, "period active" is approximate and incomplete

== See also ==
- Slovak National Catholic Church
