= Wiktor Wysoczański =

Polish Old Catholic bishop (1939–2023)

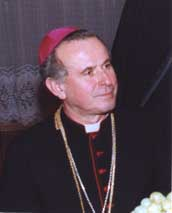
Wysoczański in 2007

Wiktor Wysoczański (24 March 1939 – 27 April 2023) was a Polish Old Catholic bishop who served as a Superior of the Polish Catholic Church.

Wysoczański was born in Verkhnie Vysotske on 24 March 1939. He became Superior in 1995, succeeding Bishop Tadeusz Majewski. As Superior, Wysoczański was chosen by the National Synod of the Church and consecrated by at least three bishops who are members of the International Conference of Old-Catholic Bishops (the Utrecht Union).

Wysoczański died on 27 April 2023, at the age of 84.
