= Old Catholic Church in Poland =

- Polish: Kościół Starokatolicki w Rzeczypospolitej Polskiej
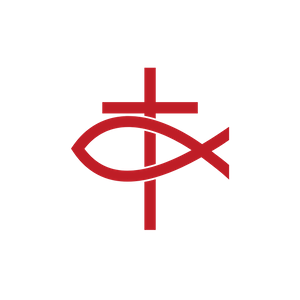
- Type: Independent Catholicism
- Classification: Polish Old Catholicism
- Orientation: Western Christianity
- Polity: Episcopal
- Prime Bishop: Waldemar Maj
- Language: Polish
- Liturgy: Latin liturgical rites
- Headquarters: Łódź, Poland
- Origin: 1931
- Members: 535 (2016)

The Old Catholic Church in the Republic of Poland is a Polish Old Catholic church operating in Poland.

== Bishops of the Old Catholic Church in Poland ==
Superiors of the Old Catholic Church over the years:

- bishop Marek Jan Kordzik (1955-2016)
- archbishop Arthur Wiecinski (born 1991)
