= Polish-Catholic Church in the Republic of Poland =

Independent Catholic denomination in Poland

Church of Poland (Polish-Catholic Church)
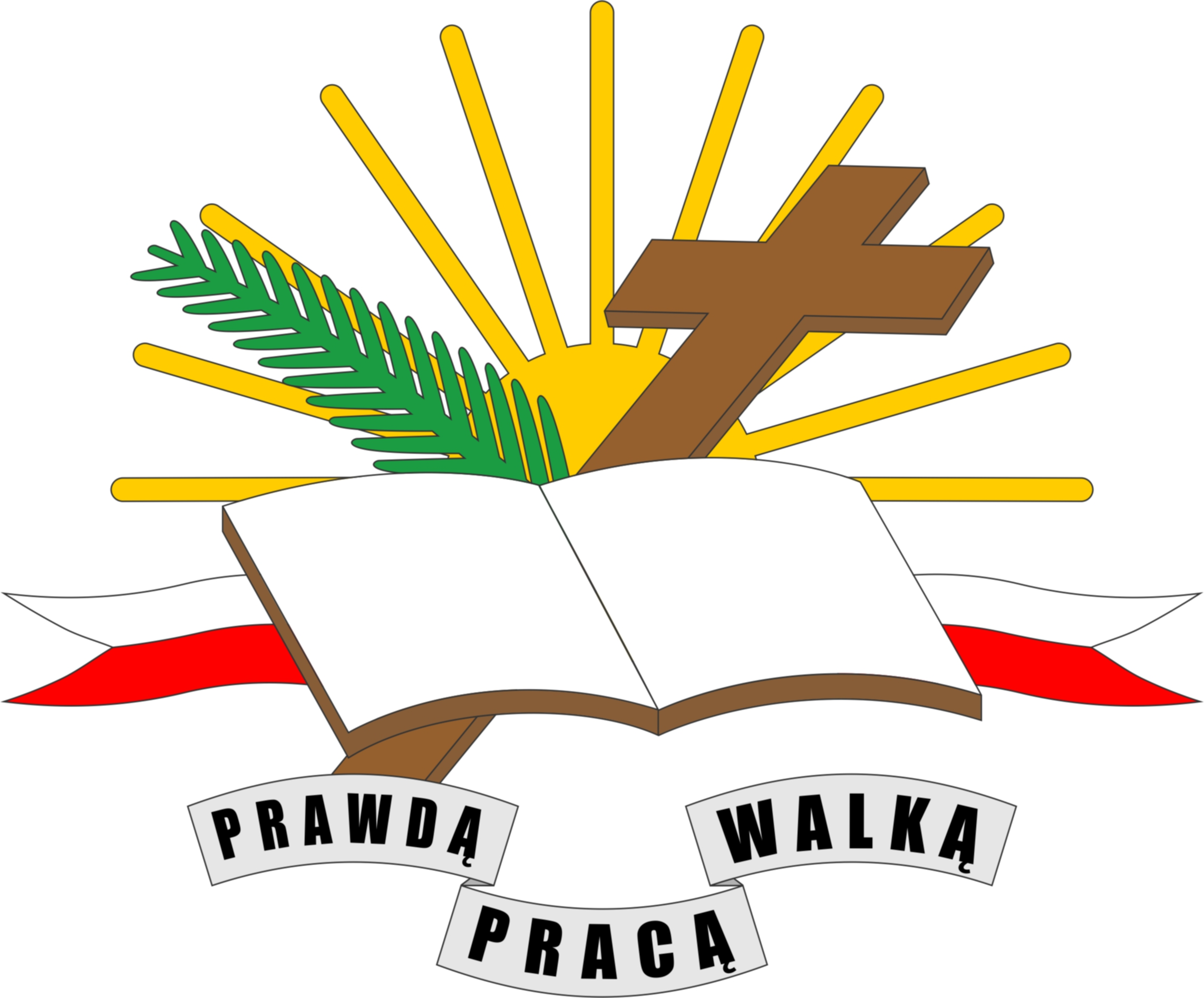
- Logo
- Type: Independent Catholicism, Old Catholicism
- Classification: Polish Old Catholicism
- Theology: Ultrajectine
- Polity: Episcopal
- Leader: Andrzej Gontarek
- Associations: International Old Catholic Bishops' Conference; Union of Utrecht; World Council of Churches
- Region: Poland
- Headquarters: Warsaw
- Separated from: Roman Catholic Church
- Branched from: Polish National Catholic Church
- Congregations: 78
- Members: 19,035 (2008)
- Ministers: 81

The Polish-Catholic Church in the Republic of Poland, also known as the Church of Poland or Polish-Catholic Church (Polish: Kościół Polski, Kościół Polskokatolicki w Rzeczypospolitej Polskiej), is a Polish Old Catholic church in Poland.

This denomination is part of the Union of Utrecht. It is a member of the World Council of Churches and the Polish Ecumenical Council. As of 2022, has 18,140 members.

== History ==
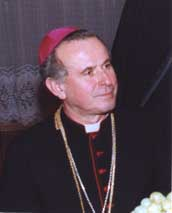
Bishop Superior Wiktor Wysoczański

The Polish-Catholic Church was founded in 1921 after the Polish-American Polish National Catholic Church sent missionaries to Poland during the Interwar period.

Bishop Wiktor Wysoczański was chosen as the church's superior in 1995 until his death in 2023. Following his death, four new bishops were consecrated for Poland.

The Polish National Catholic Church in the Union of Scranton severed ties with the Polish-Catholic Church in the Republic of Poland in September 2023.

=== Polish-Catholic Church in Great Britain ===
The Polish-Catholic Church in the United Kingdom was created in April 2018 due to a dispute between the Polish-Catholic Church in the Republic of Poland and a group of its faithful in Glasgow. The group has two parishes and about 1,000 members. Currently, the head of the church is Oliwier Windsor.

== List of superiors ==
- 1995–2023 – Bishop Wiktor Wysoczański
- 2023– – Bishop Andrzej Gontarek

== See also ==
- Antoni Naumczyk, administrator of the Polish-Catholic Church's Diocese of Warsaw
- Holy Spirit Cathedral, Warsaw
