= Karl Pruter =

Catholic bishop (1920–2007)

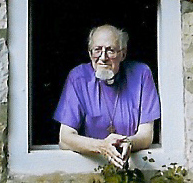
Pruter in 2005

Karl Hugo Prüter, commonly referred to as Karl Pruter (July 3, 1920 – 2007), was an Independent Old Catholic bishop in the United States. He founded the Christ Catholic Church.

In the late 1960s, Pruter became involved in the Free Catholic Movement, an association that lasted until his death. Pruter's introduction to the Free Catholic Movement and Old Catholicism came in 1963, when he traveled to Europe, where he met several leaders of the Old Catholic tradition. When he returned to the United States, he settled in Boston hoping to find an available church or bishop. Not finding any, he arranged with Archbishop Peter A. Zurawetsky to start a new church in the Back Bay area of Boston, which stressed the contemplative life, mysticism, and a faith based on personal experience.

Pruter was consecrated as bishop of the Diocese of Boston by archbishops Peter A. Zurawetsky and Uladyslau Ryzy-Ryski in 1967. The following year, Pruter designated his diocese an independent communion. After a meeting the following year, the new Christ Catholic Church was recognized when its constitution and canons were given to it by Archbishop Zurawetsky.

Pruter was a vigorous publisher and distributor of literature in his fields of interest. The press he founded, St. Willibrord Press, was a major distributor of literature about Old Catholicism. He wrote a number of tracts and pamphlets, as well as books such as The Teachings of the Great Mystics and A History of the Old Catholic Church. He also operated the Tsali Bookstore, specializing in Native American literature, and Cathedral Books which emphasizes literature about the topic of peace.

In his later years Pruter made his home in Highlandville, Missouri. He gained notice for Christ Catholic Church when he converted a small wash-house in the back yard of his home into a chapel. The official chapel of a bishop is technically designated as a "cathedral"; the structure was featured since 1984 in the Guinness Book of World Records as "The World's Smallest Cathedral".

Pruter died in 2007.

In 2010, his cathedral was planned to have its doors shut in that same year.

== Books by Pruter ==
Pruter was a prolific author on the subject of the Old Catholic movement and autocephalous churches.

- Pruter, Karl. (1957) The theology of Congregationalism San Bernardino, Calif.: Borgo Press.
- Pruter, Karl. (1973) A history of the Old Catholic Church San Bernardino, Calif.: Borgo Press.
- Pruter, Karl. (1985) The teachings of the great mystics San Bernardino, Calif.: Borgo Press.
- Pruter, Karl. (1985) Neo-congregationalism San Bernardino, Calif.: Borgo Press.
- Pruter, Karl. (1985) The people of God San Bernardino, Calif.: Borgo Press.
- Pruter, Karl. (1986) Bishops extraordinary San Bernardino, Calif.: Borgo Press. Book
- Pruter, Karl. (1986) The strange partnership of George Alexander McGuire and Marcus Garvey San Bernardino, Calif.: Borgo Press.
- Pruter, Karl. (1987) Jewish Christians in the United States: A bibliography New York: Garland Pub.. Book
- Pruter, Karl. (1995) A directory of autocephalous bishops of the Churches of the Apostolic succession 7th, rev. and expanded. edition. San Bernardino, Calif.: St. Willibrord's Press.
- Pruter, Karl. (1996) The priest's handbook 2nd, rev. and expanded edition. San Bernardino, Calif.: St. Willibrord's Press. Book, Vol. 4 in a series/set
- Pruter, Karl. (1996) The directory of autocephalous bishops of the churches of the Apostolic succession 8th, rev. and expanded. edition. San Bernardino, Calif.: St. Willibrord's Press. Book, Vol. 1 in a series/set
- Pruter, Karl. (1996) The Old Catholic Church: A history and chronology 2nd, rev. and expanded. edition. San Bernardino, Calif.: St. Willibrord's Press.
- Pruter, Karl. (1997) The mystic path San Bernardino, Calif.: St. Willibrord's Press. Book, Vol. 5 in a series/set
- Pruter, Karl; Melton, J. Gordon. (1983) The Old Catholic sourcebook New York: Garland Pub.
