= Polish Old Catholicism =

Christian denomination

Polish Old Catholicism (Polish: polskokatolicyzm) is the form of Old Catholicism which is based on Polish religious and cultural traditions.

== Associated churches ==
- Catholic Mariavite Church
- Old Catholic Church in Poland
- Old Catholic Mariavite Church
- Polish-Catholic Church in the Republic of Poland
- Polish National Catholic Church
