= Bishops' Conference of the Netherlands =

Assembly of Catholic bishops

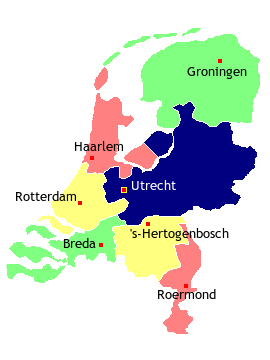
Map of the seven Roman Catholic dioceses in the Netherlands

The Bishops' Conference of the Netherlands (Dutch: Nederlandse Bisschoppenconferentie) is a permanent body within the Roman Catholic Church in the Netherlands which determines policies and directs the apostolic mission within the Netherlands. It is governed by bishops from around the country.

== Description ==
The Dutch Catholic Church has an archbishopric and six suffragan dioceses under it as well as a Military Ordinariate. An archbishop stands alone at the head of the archdiocese, but he is not the "boss" of his fellow bishops or their dioceses. Each diocese has a bishop (ordinary) and some dioceses also have one or more auxiliary bishops.

If the diocese is sede vacante, then a diocesan administrator is designated. This does not necessarily have to be a bishop and sometimes is the vicar-general. If a non-bishop is diocesan administrator, he will attend meetings of the bishops' conference, but is not a voting member.

The apostolic nuncio usually attends meetings of the Bishops' Conference, but he is not a member of it because he is not a bishop of a diocese within the Netherlands. The nuncio represents the Holy See.

The Netherlands Bishops' Conference is usually chaired by a bishop with the highest rank, such as the Archbishop, but this is not mandatory. When Wim Eijk took offices as archbishop of Utrecht in 2008, he chose not to assume the presidency, in order to have more time for his work as archbishop. Therefore, Ad van Luyn was the President and Frans Wiertz the vice-president (the two 'seniores "among the seven bishops).

Today Hans van den Hende is president and Jan Liesen is vice-president.

== Members of the Bishops' Conference ==
- Wim Eijk, Cardinal, Archbishop of Utrecht
- Jan Liesen, Bishop of Breda, Deputy Chairman
- Ron van den Hout, Bishop of Groningen-Leeuwarden
- Jos Punt, Bishop emeritus of Haarlem-Amsterdam and Military Bishop emeritus
- Gerard de Korte, Bishop of 's-Hertogenbosch
- Harrie Smeets, Bishop of Roermond
- Frans Wiertz, Bishop emeritus of Roermond
- Hans van den Hende, Bishop of Rotterdam, Chairman
- Jan Hendriks, Bishop of Haarlem-Amsterdam
- Rob Mutsaerts, Auxiliary Bishop of 's-Hertogenbosch
- Everard de Jong, Auxiliary Bishop of Roermond
- Ted Hoogenboom, Auxiliary Bishop of Utrecht
- Herman Woorts, Auxiliary Bishop of Utrecht
- Jan van Burgsteden, Auxiliary Bishop Emeritus of Haarlem-Amsterdam

== Positions Within the Bishops' Conference ==
=== Policy Sectors ===
The Bishops Conference has established a nine policies which referent is still a bishop, assisted by a secretary.

- Catechesis - Rob Mutsaerts
- Categorical Chaplaincy - Everard de Jong
- Communication and Media - Frans Wiertz
- Interfaith dialogue - Jan van Burg Cities
- Youth - Rob Mutsaerts
- Church and Society - Gerard de Korte
- Liturgy and Bible - Jan Liesen
- Mission and Development - Jos Punt
- Ecumenism - Hans van den Hende
- Education - Jan Hendriks
- Vocation and Training - Wim Eijk

=== Fields ===
In addition to the policies is a five thematic fields set, which is still a bishop referent.

- Marriage and Family - Anthony Hurkmans
- Relations with Judaism - Herman Woorts
- Medical Ethics - Wim Eijk
- Commission of the Bishops' Conferences of the European Community - Ted Hoogenboom
- Council of the Bishops' Conferences of Europe - Wim Eijk

=== Contact Persons ===
- Church and Elders - Gerard de Korte
- New Movements - Jan van Burgsteden
- Pilgrimages - Herman Woorts
- Religious and Secular Institutes - Jan van Burg Cities
- Women and the Church - Gerard de Korte

=== Former members ===
There are seven emeritus Bishop. There are also other Dutch bishops that a non-Dutch diocese boards.

=== Secretariat ===
The Secretariat of the Bishops Conference and the Dutch Church Province is conducted by the Secretariat of the Roman Catholic Communion (SRKK). The Secretariat is headed by a Secretary-General. Since June 2, 2012 this has been Rev. Mr. (deacon) Hans Nijhuis.

=== Leaders of the Bishops' Conference ===
Diocese	Ordinary	Auxiliary Bishop
Archdiocese of Utrecht	Wim Eijk, June 22, 1953 (age 72)	Ted Hoogenboom, August 27, 1960 (age 65); Herman Woorts, November 12, 1963 (age 62)
Diocese of Breda	Jan Liesen, September 17, 1960 (age 65)	none
Diocese of Groningen-Leeuwarden	Cornelis Franciscus Maria van den Hout November 11, 1964 (age 61)	none
Diocese of Haarlem-Amsterdam	Jos Punt, January 10, 1946 (age 80)	Jan Hendriks, November 17, 1954 (age 71)
Diocese of 's-Hertogenbosch	Gerard de Korte, June 13, 1955 (age 70)	Rob Mutsaerts, May 22, 1958 (age 67)
Diocese of Roermond	Frans Wiertz, December 2, 1942 (age 83)	Everard de Jong, July 4, 1958 (age 67)
Diocese of Rotterdam	Hans van den Hende, January 9, 1964 (age 62)	none
Military Ordinariate of the Netherlands	Jos Punt, January 10, 1946 (age 80) (apostolic administrator)	none
