= Ronald Cornelissen =

Dutch Roman Catholic clergyman (born 1964)

His Excellency Ronald Cornelissen
- Bishop of Groningen-Leeuwarden
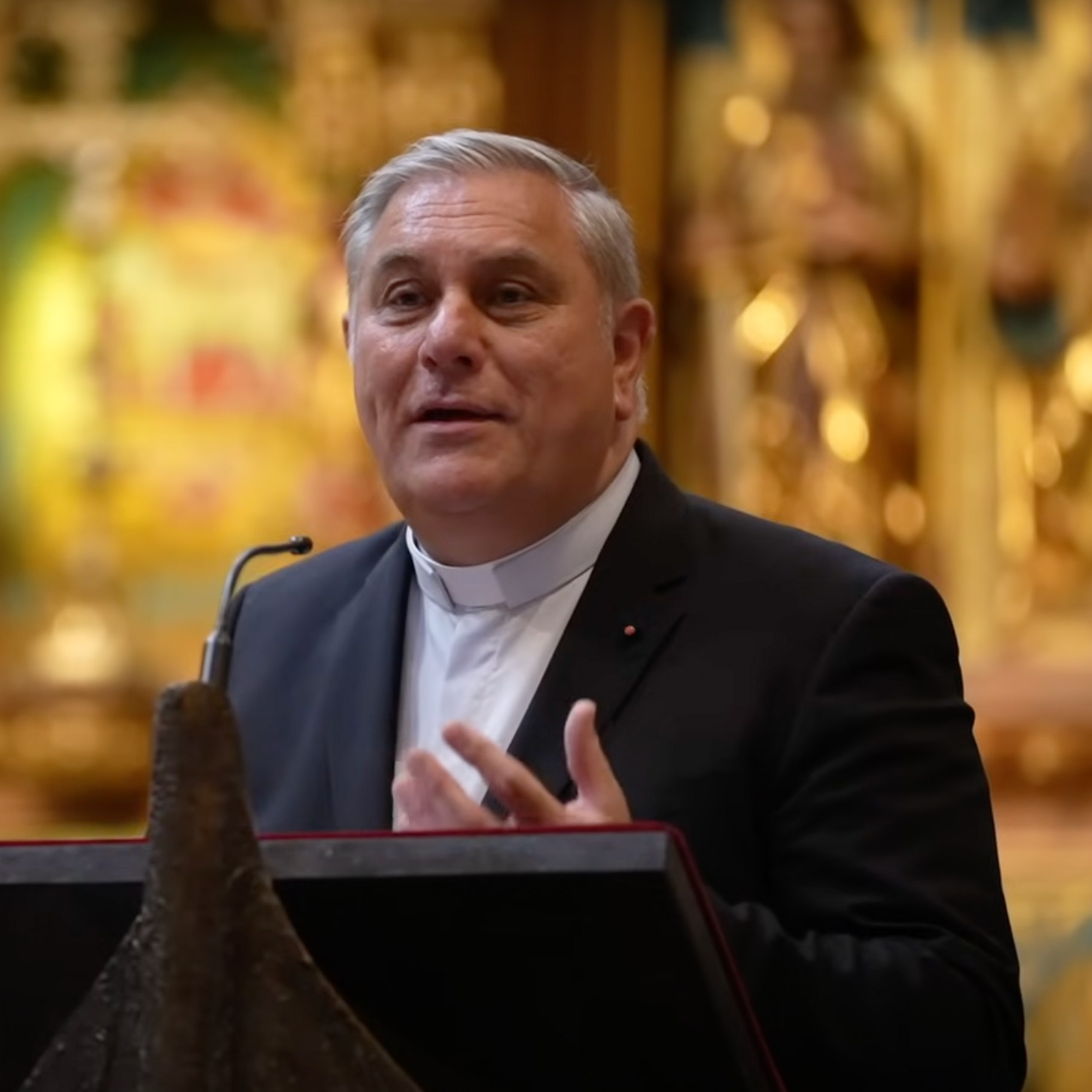
- Bishop Cornelissen in 2025
- Church: Roman Catholic
- Province: Utrecht
- Diocese: Roman Catholic Diocese of Groningen-Leeuwarden
- Installed: 11 October 2025
- Term ended: present
- Predecessor: Ron van den Hout

Orders
- Ordination: 19 October 1996 by Adrianus Johannes Simonis
- Consecration: 11 October 2025 by Wim Eijk

Personal details
- Born: Ronald Gerhardus Wilhelmus Cornelissen; 12 December 1964 (age 61) Gaanderen, Netherlands
- Denomination: Roman Catholic
- Motto: Peregrinantes in Spem
- Coat of arms

Ronald Gerhardus Wilhelmus Cornelissen (born 12 December 1964) is a Dutch Roman Catholic clergyman. Since 11 October 2025, he has served as the 4th bishop of the Diocese of Groningen–Leeuwarden. His motto is Perigrinantes in spem (Pilgrims of hope).

== Early life and education ==
Cornelissen was born in Gaanderen as the youngest of four children. He attended the Saint Augustine School in Gaanderen and later the Isala College in Silvolde, where he completed HAVO and VWO education. He studied theology at the Ariëns Institute in Utrecht.

== Church career ==
On 19 October 1996, he was ordained a priest in St. Catherine’s Cathedral in Utrecht by Cardinal Simonis. He subsequently served in pastoral assignments in Slagharen, Denekamp, Deventer, Raalte, and Rijssen. In addition, he was involved in the organization and spiritual guidance of pilgrimages. From 2009 until 2025, he served as episcopal vicar of the Deventer vicariate.

On 7 July 2025, Cornelissen was appointed bishop of the Diocese of Groningen–Leeuwarden. He succeeded Ron van den Hout, who was appointed bishop of the Diocese of Roermond. On 11 October 2025, Cornelissen received episcopal consecration and took possession of the episcopal see at St. Joseph’s Cathedral in Groningen. The Archbishop of Utrecht, Cardinal Eijk, served as the principal consecrator.

== Ordinations ==
Styles of Ronald Gerhardus Wilhelmus Cornelissen
- Reference style: Most Reverend
- Spoken style: Your Excellency
- Religious style: Bishop

- Deacon - 27 January 1996 by Cardinal Simonis in St Catherine's Cathedral, Utrecht.
- Priest - 19 October 1996 by Cardinal Simonis in St Catherine's Cathedral, Utrecht.
- Bishop - 11 October 2025 by Cardinal Eijk, Bishop Hans van den Hende and Bishop Herman Woorts in St. Joseph Cathedral, Groningen.
