= Henricus Calenus =

- Native name: Henri van Caelen
- Diocese: Roermond
- Appointed: 1644
- Quashed: 1648
- Predecessor: Jacobus a Castro (1611-1639)
- Successor: Andreas Creusen (1651-1657)
- Other posts: archpriest of Brussels, canon of Mechelen cathedral

Orders
- Ordination: 27 December 1607

Personal details
- Born: Henri van Caelen; 1583 Beringen, County of Loon, Prince-Bishopric of Liège
- Died: 1 February 1653 (aged 69–70) Brussels, Duchy of Brabant, Spanish Netherlands
- Buried: St Catherine's, Brussels
- Denomination: Catholic
- Parents: Jan van Caelen (magistrate), Catherine Gevaerts
- Education: philosophy, theology
- Alma mater: Leuven University

Henricus Calenus or Henri van Caelen (1583–1653) was a clergyman in the Spanish Netherlands, closely involved in the early history of Jansenism.

== Career ==
Born in 1583 at Beringen (in the county of Loon), Henri was the son of Jan van Caelen, a local magistrate, and Catherine Gevaerts. He studied philosophy and theology at Leuven University, enrolling in Pope's College in 1604 and graduating STL in 1615. In the meantime, he had been ordained to the priesthood on 27 December 1607 and appointed parish priest of Asse on 31 January 1609.

Calenus went on to be appointed archpriest of Aalst in 1612, and in 1624 parish priest of St Catherine's in the City of Brussels, and archpriest of Brussels. In Brussels, he worked to improve the provision of primary education. He was later appointed a canon of Mechelen Cathedral.

By 1635, Calenus had been appointed a diocesan censor, on 24 October approving publication of Juan Caramuel y Lobkowitz's Declaración Mystica de las Armas de España. In 1638, it was he who passed Cornelius Jansen’s Augustinus for publication, not only declaring it free of anything contrary to faith and morals but writing a glowing recommendation that publication be allowed. In 1644, he was named bishop of the vacant see of Roermond, but the pope refused to confirm his appointment, and he relinquished all claim to the nomination in 1648.

He died in Brussels on 1 February 1653 and was buried in the church of St Catherine, where he had been parish priest.

== Writings ==
- Kort verhael van den eersten oorsprong van twee miraculeuse crucifixen berustende in de parochiekerk der vrijheyt Assche (Brussels, 1615)
