= Maria Teresa of St. Joseph =

German religious sister (1855–1938)

Blessed Maria Teresa of Saint Joseph DCJ
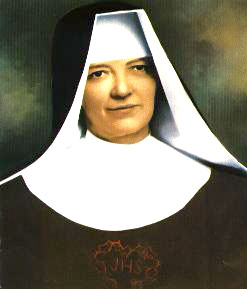

Virgin
- Born: 19 June 1855; Sandow, Brandenburg, German Confederation
- Died: 20 September 1938 (aged 83); Sittard, Limburg, Netherlands
- Venerated in: Roman Catholic Church
- Beatified: 13 May 2006, Roermond Cathedral, Netherlands by Cardinal Adrianus Johannes Simonis
- Feast: 30 October
- Patronage: Carmelite Daughters of the Divine Heart of Jesus
- Influences: Teresa of Ávila
- Major works: The Servant of God

Maria Teresa of Saint Joseph, DCJ (born Anna Maria Tauscher van den Bosch; 19 June 1855 – 20 September 1938), was a German religious sister and the founder of the Carmelite Daughters of the Divine Heart of Jesus. Tauscher worked in Cologne and was removed from her position after she converted to Roman Catholicism in 1888 so founded a congregation in the Netherlands upon choosing the Carmelite charism for her life. Her beatification was held in mid-2006 in the Netherlands.

== Life ==
Anna Maria Tauscher van den Bosch was born in the German Confederation on 19 June 1855 to Hermann Traugott Tauscher and Pauline van den Bosch. Tauscher came from a religious background as both her father and her grandfather were Protestant pastors.

Both Anna and her sister Lisa were educated by Moravian Brothers; this, and reading the autobiography of Teresa of Ávila, led to Anna considering becoming a nun. From 1885 to 1888 she worked with those suffering mental disabilities at a Protestant institution in Cologne, but lost her job following her conversion; on 30 October 1888 she was baptised into the Roman Catholic Church.

After having opened a home for neglected children just prior to that in Berlin, Tauscher founded the Carmelite Daughters of the Divine Heart of Jesus on 2 July 1891. She made vows in 1893. The religious sister took for a model the Discalced Carmelite Teresa of Ávila. The new congregation took on the Carmelite charism to the fullest and coupled it with apostolic service. Her concern was directed to poor and neglected children in addition to families and individuals who had left the Church. The congregation was also focused on immigrants and the aged. She published The Servant of God.

After many difficulties, TRauscher moved to Sittard in the Netherlands in 1899, to establish the congregation and to continue its work; the congregation was later aggregated to the Discalced Carmelites on 25 October 1904 and received the decree of praise from Pope Pius X on 9 May 1910. Pope Pius XI granted papal approval to the congregation on 12 May 1930. In 1912, she left Europe to set up new congregations in north America; she returned to Europe in 1920. Tauscher died on 20 September 1938 in Sittard.

In 2005 there were 454 religious in 53 houses in nations such as Iceland and Nicaragua. By 2014, there were 57 convents across 11 countries.

== Beatification ==
The beatification process opened in Roermond in an informative process that was launched in the diocese on 2 February 1953 and was later concluded on 20 September 1957; the Congregation for the Causes of Saints validated this process in Rome on 15 May 1987 while later receiving the positio from the postulation in 1992. Theologians assented to the cause on 25 June 2002 as did the members of the Congregation on 1 October 2002. The confirmation of her life of heroic virtue allowed for Pope John Paul II to title her as venerable on 20 December 2002.

A miracle attributed to Tauschers intercession received validation on 11 January 2005. Pope Benedict XVI approved this on 19 December 2005. He delegated Cardinal Adrianus Johannes Simonis to preside over the beatification in the Netherlands on 13 May 2006. Tauscher's liturgical feast was not affixed to her date of death, but on the date of her conversion. The postulator for this cause is Bonifatius Honings, OCD.
