= Mauriana =

Former Roman city and modern titular see in North Africa

Mauriana was an ancient city and bishopric in Roman North Africa, which remains a Latin Church titular see of the Catholic Church.

== History ==
Mauriana was among the many towns in the Roman province of Mauretania Caesariensis which were important enough to become a suffragan diocese, in the papal sway, but destined to fade so completely (at the 7th century advent of Islam?) that its present location in modern Algeria hasn't even been established.

Its earliest recorded bishop may have been Lucianus, who assisted, according to Morcelli, at a council in Rome in 337; Mesnage believes that geographically implausible and suggests his see may rather have been Mariana, Corsica.

Mauriana's only historically sure incumbent was Secondus, participant in the Council called at Carthage in 484 by king Huneric of the Vandal Kingdom, after which he was exiled, like most Catholic participants, unlike their Donatist heretic counterparts.

== Titular see ==
The diocese was nominally restored in 1933 as the Latin Church titular see of Mauriana (Latin = Curiate Italian) / Maurianen(sis) (Latin adjective).

It has had the following incumbents:

- Johannes Willebrands (1964.06.04 – 1969.04.28), while Secretary of Secretariat for Christian Unity (1960.06.28 – 1969.04.28); later President of Pontifical Council for Promoting Christian Unity (1969.04.12 – 1989.12.12), created Cardinal-Deacon of Santi Cosma e Damiano (1969.04.30 – 1975.12.06), Military Vicariate of Netherlands (Netherlands) (1975.12.06 – 1982.11.22), Metropolitan Archbishop of Archdiocese of Utrecht (Netherlands) (1975.12.06 – resigned 1983.12.03), promoted Cardinal-Priest of S. Sebastiano alle Catacombe (1975.12.06 – death 2006.08.02), President of Episcopal Conference of the Netherlands (1976 – 1983), Camerlengo of College of Cardinals (1988.05.02 – retired 1995)
- Titular Archbishop: Pio Laghi (1969.05.24 – 1991.06.28) as papal diplomat : Apostolic Delegate to Jerusalem and Palestine (1969.05.24 – 1973.05.28), Apostolic Pro-Nuncio to Cyprus (1973.05.28 – 1974.04.27), Apostolic Nuncio (ambassador) to Argentina (1974.04.27 – 1980.12.10), Apostolic Delegate to United States of America (1980.12.10 – 1984.03.26), Permanent Observer to Organization of American States (OAS) (1980.12.10 – 1990.04.06), Apostolic Pro-Nuncio to United States of America (1984.03.26 – 1990.04.06), Pro-Prefect of Congregation for Catholic Education (for Seminaries and Educational Institutions) (1990.04.06 – 1991.07.01), President of Interdicasterial Commission for Candidates to Sacred Order (1990.04.06 – 1999.11.15), created Cardinal-Deacon of S. Maria Ausiliatrice in Via Tuscolana (1991.06.28 – 2002.02.26), Prefect of Congregation for Catholic Education (for Seminaries and Educational Institutions) (1991.07.01 – 1999.11.15), President of Interdicasterial Commission for Equitable Distribution of Priests (1991.07.20 – 1999.11.15), Patron of Sovereign Military Hospitaller Order of Saint John of Jerusalem of Rhodes and of Malta (1993.05.08 – 2009.01.10), Protodeacon of College of Cardinals (1999.01.09 – 2002.02.26), promoted Cardinal-Priest of S. Pietro in Vincoli (2002.02.26 [2002.05.31] – death 2009.01.10)
- Petar Šolic (1991.12.14 – death 1992.12.06) as Auxiliary Bishop of Archdiocese of Split–Makarska (Croatia) (1991.12.14 – 1992.12.06)
- Juan Carlos Maccarone (1993.01.30 – 1996.07.03) as Auxiliary Bishop of Diocese of Lomas de Zamora (Argentina) (1993.01.30 – 1996.07.03); later Bishop of Chascomús (Argentina) (1996.07.03 – 1999.02.18), Bishop of Santiago del Estero (Argentina) (1999.02.18 – retired 2005.08.19), died 2015
- Nicholas Anthony DiMarzio (1996.09.10 – 1999.06.07) as Auxiliary Bishop of Archdiocese of Newark (USA) (1996.09.10 – 1999.06.07); next Bishop of Camden (USA) (1999.06.07 – 2003.08.01), Bishop of Brooklyn (NY, USA) (2003.08.01 – ...)
- Aurel Percă (1999.09.29 – ...), Auxiliary Bishop of Diocese of Iași (Romania) (1999.09.29 – ...).

== See also ==
- List of Catholic dioceses in Algeria

== Sources and external links ==
- GCatholic - with (titular) incumbent bio links

Bibliography

- Pius Bonifacius Gams, Series episcoporum Ecclesiae Catholicae, Leipzig 1931, p. 467
- Stefano Antonio Morcelli, Africa christiana, Volume I, Brescia 1816, p. 218
- Joseph Mesnage, L'Afrique chrétienne, Paris 1912, p. 495
