= Johannes Willebrands =

Dutch Catholic cardinal (1909–2006)

His Eminence Johannes Willebrands
- Cardinal; Archbishop Emeritus of Utrecht; Primate Emeritus of the Netherlands
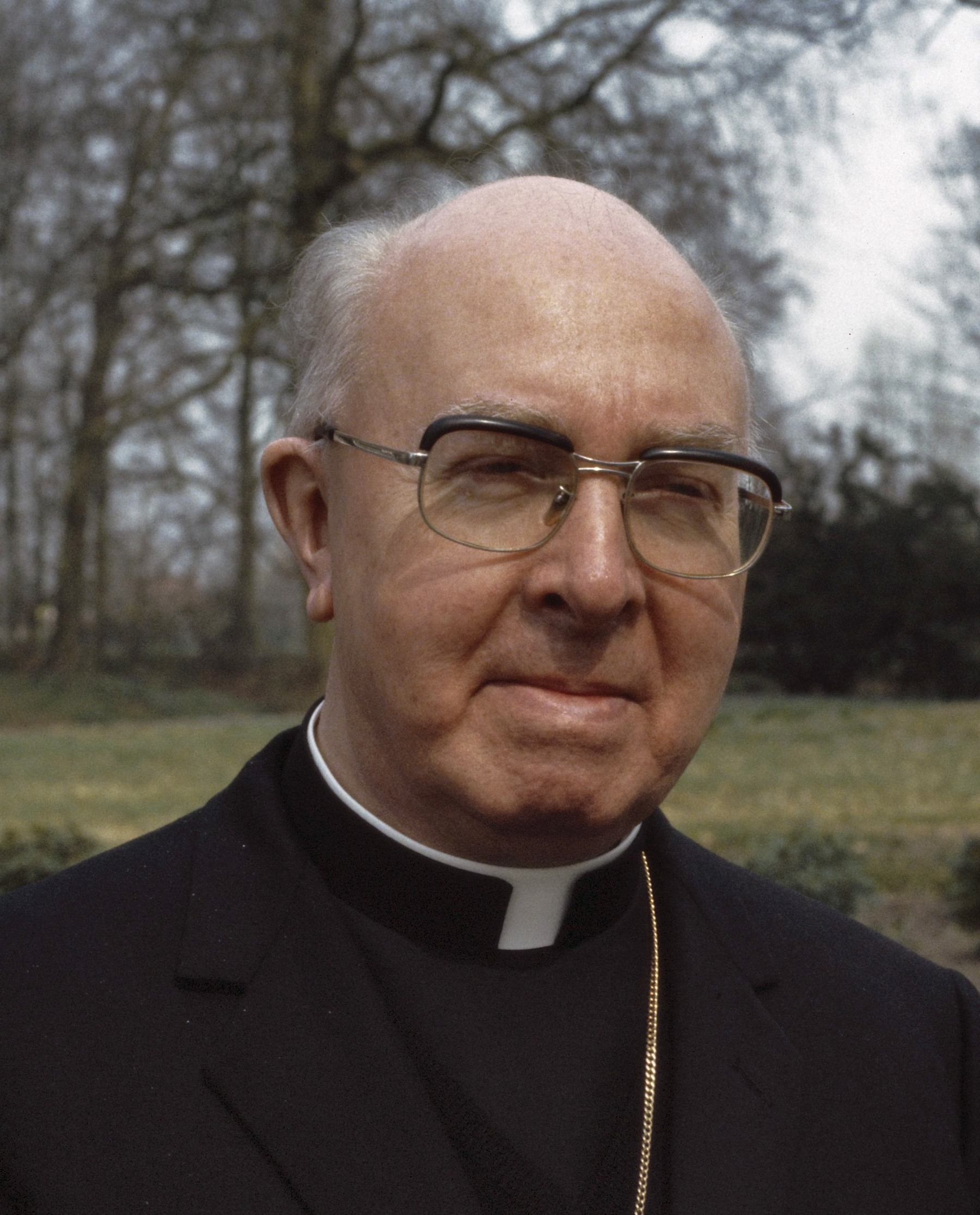
- The cardinal seen in 1982.
- Church: Roman Catholic Church
- Archdiocese: Utrecht
- Province: Utrecht
- See: Utrecht
- Appointed: 6 December 1975
- Installed: 21 January 1976
- Term ended: 3 December 1983
- Predecessor: Bernardus Johannes Alfrink
- Successor: Adrianus Johannes Simonis
- Other post: Cardinal-Priest of San Sebastiano alle Catacombe (1975-2006)
- Previous posts: Secretary of the Secretariat for Christian Unity (1960-69); Titular Bishop of Mauriana (1964-69); President of the Pontifical Council for Promoting Christian Unity (1969-89); Cardinal-Deacon of Santi Cosma e Damiano (1969-75); Military Vicar of the Netherlands (1975-82); President of the Dutch Episcopal Conference (1976-83); Camerlengo of the College of Cardinals (1988-95)

Orders
- Ordination: 26 May 1934
- Consecration: 4 June 1964 by Pope Paul VI
- Created cardinal: 28 April 1969 by Pope Paul VI
- Rank: Cardinal-Deacon (1969-75); Cardinal-Priest (1975-2006)

Personal details
- Born: Johannes Gerardus Maria Willebrands; 4 September 1909 Bovenkarspel, Netherlands
- Died: 1 August 2006 (aged 96) Saint Nicolaasstichting, Denekamp, Netherlands
- Parents: Herman Petrus Willebrands; Afra Kok
- Education: Pontifical University of Saint Thomas Aquinas
- Motto: Veritatem in caritate
- Coat of arms

Johannes Gerardus Maria Willebrands (4 September 1909 in Bovenkarspel, North Holland – 1 August 2006) was a Dutch Cardinal of the Roman Catholic Church. He served as President of the Pontifical Council for Promoting Christian Unity from 1969 to 1989, and Archbishop of Utrecht from 1975 to 1983. Elevated to the cardinalate in 1969, Willebrands was central to the increased ecumenism of the Church in the second half of the 20th century, and was considered papabile at the two conclaves held in 1978.

== Biography ==
=== Youth and ordination ===
Johannes Willebrands was born in Bovenkarspel, as the eldest of the nine children of Herman and Afra (née Kok) Willebrands. His father worked as a paymaster at the local vegetable market, and one of his brothers went on to become a Redemptorist missionary in Surinam. Willebrands studied at the Major Seminary, Warmond, near Leiden, where he was ordained to the priesthood on 26 May 1934. In 1937 he received a Doctorate in Philosophy at the Pontifical Athenaeum Angelicum in Rome with a thesis entitled John Henry Cardinal Newman Zijn denkleer en haar toepassing op de kennis van God door het geweten.

=== Early involvement in ecumenism ===
Willebrands returned to the Netherlands in 1937 and acted as chaplain of the Church of Begijnhof in Amsterdam. In 1940 he began teaching philosophy at his alma mater of the Warmond seminary. Five years later, he became the seminary's rector. Willebrands demonstrated a very active interest in the cause of Christian unity as president of the St Willibrord Association, which promoted ecumenism in the Netherlands; in 1951, he organized the Catholic Conference on Ecumenical Questions, which was in contact with the World Council of Churches.

=== Bishop of Mauriana ===
He was named Titular Bishop of Mauriana on 4 June 1964. Willebrands received his episcopal consecration on the following 28 June from Pope Paul VI, with Archbishops Diego Venini and Ettore Cunial serving as co-consecrators, in St. Peter's Basilica. On 7 December 1965, he read out the declaration by which the Catholic and Orthodox churches "cancelled out of the memory of men" their mutual excommunication following the Great Schism of 1054.

Styles of Johannes Willebrands
- Reference style: His Eminence
- Spoken style: Your Eminence
- Informal style: Cardinal
- See: Utrecht

=== Pontifical Council for Promoting Christian Unity ===
On 28 June 1960, Pope John XXIII nominated him Secretary of the newly established Secretariat for Promoting Christian Unity (later elevated to a pontifical council), under the direction of Augustin Bea. Aided by fluency in six languages, Willebrands was involved in building bridges to the Anglican church, and the Russian Orthodox church.

He was instrumental in persuading the Orthodox churches to attend the sessions of the Second Vatican Council as observers while it met from 1962 to 1965. During the work of the Second Vatican Council, he prepared the documents relating to scripture and tradition, ecumenism, religious freedom, and relations with non-Christian religions. Willebrands was raised to the rank of Monsignor in 1963. On 12 April 1969, Pope Paul VI named Willebrands as President of the Secretariat for Promoting Christian Unity, succeeding Cardinal Bea after his death.

After his resignation as archbishop of Utrecht, Willebrands continued as president for Promoting Christian Unity. Willebrands acted as President Delegate at the Second Extraordinary Assembly of World Synod of Bishops, held from 24 November to 8 December 1985, and became president emeritus of the Pontifical Council for Promoting Christian Unity on 12 December 1989, when was succeeded as president by Edward Idris Cassidy.

=== Archbishop of Utrecht ===
On 6 December 1975, he was appointed Archbishop of Utrecht and thus de facto Primate of the Netherlands, continuing at the same time to serve as President of the Secretariat. It was hoped that would be able to use his diplomatic talents to reconcile the conservative and liberal wings of the Catholic Church in the Netherlands, but the qualities of patience, reticence and reservation that made him such a success in ecumenical circles did not endear him to his Dutch flock. He resigned as Archbishop on 3 December 1983.

=== Cardinal elector ===
He was created Cardinal-Deacon of Santi Cosma e Damiano by Paul VI in the consistory of 28 April 1969, and later became Cardinal-Priest of S. Sebastiano alle Catacombe on 6 December 1975.

Cardinal Willebrands was one of the cardinal electors who participated at the conclaves of August and October 1978, which selected Pope John Paul I and Pope John Paul II, respectively. During the latter conclave, the highly papabile Dutch prelate willingly withdrew his candidacy in order for Karol Wojtyła to be elected pope.

He became Camerlengo of the Sacred College of Cardinals in 1988, and served until 1995, after which the post was abolished.

=== Retirement and death ===
Cardinal Willebrands moved to the Franciscan convent of Saint Nicolaasstichting at Denekamp in 1997, where he died nine years later, at age 96. At the time of his death, he was the oldest living member of the College of Cardinals.

Catholic Church titles
New title	Titular Bishop of Mauriana; 4 June 1964 – 28 April 1969	Succeeded by Pio Laghi
Preceded by Francesco Morano	Cardinal Deacon of Santi Cosma e Damiano; 28 April 1969 – 6 December 1975	Succeeded by Eduardo Francisco Pironio
Preceded by Bernardus Johannes Alfrink	Apostolic vicar of the Military vicariate of the Netherlands; 6 December 1975 – 12 November 1982	Succeeded by Ronald Philippe Bär
Preceded by Bernardus Johannes Alfrink	Archbishop of Utrecht; 6 December 1975 – 3 December 1983	Succeeded by Adrianus Johannes Simonis
Preceded by Sebastiano Baggio	Cardinal Priest of San Sebastiano alle Catacombe; 6 December 1975 – 1 August 2006	Succeeded by Lluís Martínez Sistach
Records
Preceded by Corrado Bafile	Oldest living Member of the Sacred College; 3 February 2005 – 2 August 2006	Succeeded by Alfons Maria Stickler
