= Frans Wiertz =

Dutch prelate

His Excellency Franciscus J. M. Wiertz
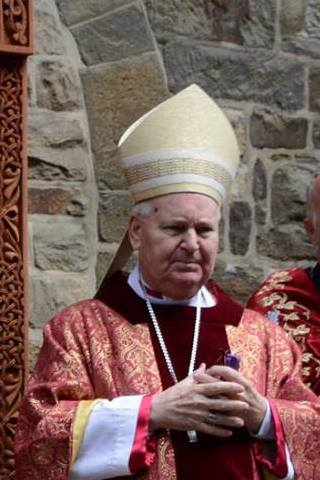
- Frans Wiertz in 2016
- Native name: Frans
- Province: Utrecht
- Diocese: Roman Catholic Diocese of Roermond
- Appointed: 10 July 1993
- Term ended: 2 December 2017
- Predecessor: Joannes Gijsen
- Successor: Harrie Smeets

Orders
- Ordination: March 30, 1968 by Petrus Moors
- Consecration: September 25, 1993 by Adrianus Johannes Cardinal Simonis

Personal details
- Born: Franciscus Jozef Maria Wiertz; December 2, 1942 (age 83) Kerkrade, Netherlands
- Denomination: Roman Catholic
- Motto: Geef, Heer, liefde en geloof aan uw Kerk English: Give, Lord, love and faith to your Church
- Coat of arms

Franciscus Jozef Maria (Frans) Wiertz (December 2, 1942) is a prelate of the Roman Catholic Church. He was bishop of Roermond from 1993 until 2017.

== Early life ==
Born in Kerkrade as the oldest in a family of nine, Wiertz studied at the Minor seminary Rolduc, from where he graduated in 1961, having passed his state examinations. He studied history for a year at the Radboud University Nijmegen, before starting his studies to become a priest in 1962 in Kerkrade and Heerlen. He studied at the seminary in Roermond starting in 1964.

== Priesthood ==
Wiertz was ordained deacon on September 23, 1967, and ordained to the priesthood on March 30, 1968, by Petrus Moors, bishop of Roermond. He worked as a chaplain at the saints Peter and Paul parish in Schaesberg, before being asked to build a church and to start a new parish for the new neighbourhood De Heeg in Maastricht in 1977; the saints Monulph and Gondulph parish. In 1981 he was installed there as priest, which he would remain until 1985, when he became dean of the deanery of Hoensbroek and priest of the saint John the Evangelist parish in Hoensbroek. In 1991 he became dean of the deanery of Heerlen, succeeding Jos Punt, the later bishop of Haarlem-Amsterdam, and also became priest of the saint Pancras parish in Heerlen. In that same year he was also named a canon of the Roermond chapter, of which he became chairman in 1992.

== Bishop of Roermond ==
In 1993 bishop Joannes Gijsen of Roermond stepped down due to declining health. On July 10, 1993, Wiertz was appointed bishop of Roermond. He received his episcopal consecration on September 25 of that year, from Adrianus Johannes Cardinal Simonis, archbishop of Utrecht, with the bishop of 's-Hertogenbosch, Joannes Gerardus ter Schure, and the auxiliary bishop of Roermond, Alphonsus Maria Henricus Antonius Castermans, serving as co-consecrators. He chose the motto Geef, Heer, liefde en geloof aan uw Kerk (English: Give, Lord, love and faith to your Church).

As a bishop he was principal consecrator of bishop Everardus Johannes de Jong, and principal co-consecrator of bishops Jozef Marianus Punt, Antonius Lambertus Maria Hurkmans, Willem Jacobus Cardinal Eijk, Johannes Wilhelmus Maria Liesen and Robertus Gerardus Leonia Maria Mutsaerts.

Wiertz was vice-chairman of the Bishops' Conference of the Netherlands, in charge of communications and media.

=== Sexual abuse ===
In 2014 two complaints against Wiertz's predecessor in the diocese of Roermond, Joannes Gijsen, for sexual abuse dating from the period 1958–1961, were deemed valid by the complaints commission of the Catholic Church. The determination that complaints were valid was the first time against a Dutch bishop. Wiertz apologized for Gijsen's behaviour.

In the late 2010s it became known to the public that Wiertz had appointed two pastors who were known to Wiertz to have a history of abusing youngsters. One of the pastors repeated his offences, for which he was transferred to another parish.

== Retirement ==
On 2 December 2017 Wiertz retired as bishop of Roermond upon reaching the age of 75 years, the retirement age for priests, stating that increasing loss of eyesight was limiting his work. The cathedral chapter made three unanimous suggestions to the nuntius to fill the vacancy, which were rejected. This was followed by a vacancy of a year, during which vicar general Hub Schnackers acted as diocesan administrator. On 8 December 2018 Harrie Smeets, dean of the deanery of Venray and a member of the cathedral chapter, was appointed bishop of Roermond. After his retirement Wiertz settled in Maastricht and remains part of the administration of the diocese of Roermond as bishop emeritus.
