= Carmelite Daughters of the Divine Heart of Jesus =

Catholic religious order

Carmelite Sisters of the Divine Heart of Jesus
- Abbreviation: DCJ
- Formation: 1891
- Type: Religious congregation
- Headquarters: Sittard, Netherlands
- General Mother: M. Karla Marija Peranović
- Key people: Maria Teresa of St. Joseph, founder
- Website: www.carmelitedcj.org

The Carmelite Sisters of the Divine Heart of Jesus is a religious institute in the Catholic Church founded by Maria Teresa of St. Joseph (Anna Maria Tauscher) on July 2, 1891, in the Netherlands. Mother Mary Teresa traveled to the United States in 1912 to establish a community in the U.S. The Provincial House was opened in 1917 in Wauwatosa, Wisconsin and the first American postulant was received in 1920 from the Milwaukee area.

== Areas of concern ==
The charism, or spiritual focus, of this religious institute is to offer reparation to Jesus for the denial and unbelief of his divinity. This is done through prayer, meditation and especially through weekly adoration of the Blessed Sacrament.

The apostolate of the institute is to provide "A home away from home" for children and the elderly. For this purpose the congregation has houses in Europe, the United States, Canada, Central America, South America, and Africa.

In the U.S. the Sisters have cared for the elderly, since 1929, at St. Agnes Home in Kirkwood, MO, since 1952 at the Carmel Nursing Home in Owensboro, KY, since 1917 at St. Joseph Home for the Aged in Kenosha, WI, since 1951 at Saint Ann's Home in Grand Rapids, MI; and since 1954 at Mount Carmel Home in Corpus Christi, TX.

On the same property in Kirkwood, the Sisters care for children ages 2–5 at their Carmelite Child Development Center. They maintain a Residential Treatment Center for boys in Wauwatosa, WI opened in 1917; a Residential Treatment Center for girls (originally an orphanage opened in 1913) in East Chicago, IN with an Emergency Shelter Care for infants and small children who are victims of trauma, abuse or neglect.

The General Mother House is in the city of Sittard, the Netherlands; where the Mother General resides. The General Mother House serves as the highest authority after the Pope and the Sacred Congregation for Religious and Secular Institutes in Rome as the principal body that regulates religious life in the Congregation.

== U.S. states and cities where established ==
- Wauwatosa, WI
- East Chicago, IN
- Kenosha, WI
- Grand Rapids, MI
- Kirkwood, MO
- Owensboro, KY
- Corpus Christi, TX
