= Diocese of Groningen-Leeuwarden =

Roman Catholic diocese in the Netherlands

Coordinates: 53.2146°N 6.5731°E

Diocese of Groningen-Leeuwarden Dioecesis Groningensis-Leovardiensis Bisdom Groningen-Leeuwarden (nl) Bisdom Grins-Ljouwert (fy)

Catholic
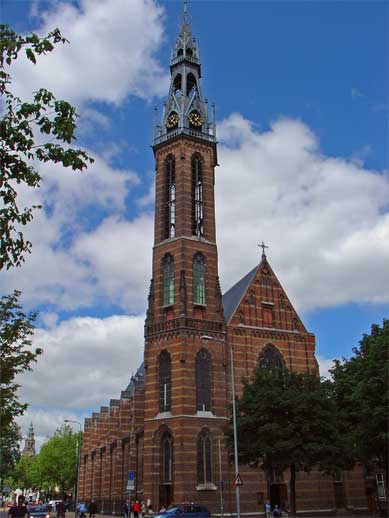
- The Saint Joseph Cathedral in Groningen

- Coat of arms

Location
- Country: Netherlands
- Territory: Groningen, Friesland, Drenthe, and the Noordoostpolder
- Ecclesiastical province: Utrecht
- Metropolitan: Archdiocese of Utrecht

Statistics
- Area: 9,205 km^{2} (3,554 sq mi)
- Population: Total; Catholics: (as of 2019); 1,944,920; 102,150 (5.3%)

Information
- Denomination: Roman Catholic
- Rite: Latin Rite
- Established: 12 May 1559
- Cathedral: St. Joseph Cathedral, Groningen
- Patron saint: Saint Boniface

Current leadership
- Pope: Leo XIV
- Bishop: Ronald Cornelissen
- Metropolitan Archbishop: Wim Eijk
- Vicar General: Peter Wellen

Map
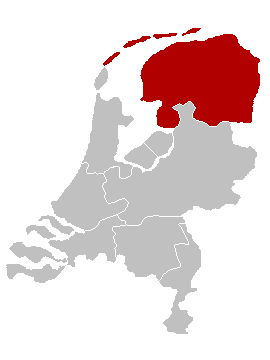
- Location of the Diocese of Groningen-Leeuwarden in the Netherlands

Website
- www.bisdomgl.nl

The Diocese of Groningen-Leeuwarden (Dutch: Bisdom Groningen-Leeuwarden; Latin: Dioecesis Groningensis-Leovardiensis) is a suffragan Latindiocese of the Catholic Church in the northern part of the ecclesiastical province of the Metropolitan Roman Catholic Archdiocese of Utrecht (covering all the Netherlands). It encompasses the provinces of Groningen, Friesland and Drenthe, as well as the Noordoostpolder, a part of the province of Flevoland.

The cathedral episcopal seat is the Saint Joseph Cathedral in the city of Groningen, capital of the province of the same name. One former cathedral remains in Catholic use : the Sint-Maartenskerk, dedicated to Saint Martin, also in Groningen, is now Protestant church; the Sint-Vituskerk, dedicated to Saint Vitus, in Leeuwarden (Friesland province, most of Dutch Frisia) is only rarely frequented by a small community of faithful from an old orphanage.

== History ==
- Established on 12 May 1559 as Diocese of Groningen / Groningen(sis) (Latin), on territories split off from the then Diocese of Utrecht and Diocese of Munster (Germany).
- Suppressed in 1600.
- The diocese was re-erected on 2 February 1956 as the Diocese of Groningen/ Groningen(sis) (Latin), on territories split off from its Metropolitan, the Archdiocese of Utrecht, and from the Diocese of Haarlem (Holland).
- Renamed on 4 February 2006 as Diocese of Groningen–Leeuwarden (Nederlands) / Groninga–Leeuwarden (Curiate Italian) / Groningen(sis) et Leovardien(sis) (Latin adjective), albeit it without a co-cathedral.

== Statistics and extent ==
As per 2014, it pastorally served 110,000 Catholics (5.7% of 1,923,000 total) on 8,585 km^{2} in 81 parishes with 36 priests (30 diocesan, 6 religious), 3 deacons, 18 lay religious (7 brothers, 11 sisters) and 9 seminarians. It is the smallest Dutch diocese in population, even while it is the largest in area, covering an area of some 9,205 square kilometers (3,554 sq mi). As per the most recent data available, the number of churchgoers in 2005 was 12,435 or 0.7% of the total population.

== Episcopal ordinaries ==
(Roman Rite)

=== Bishops of Groningen ===
- Johannes Knijff (1561–1576)
- Jan van Bruhesen (1589–1592)
- Arnold Nijlen (1593–1594)

=== Suffragan Bishops of Groningen ===
- Pieter Antoon Nierman (1956–1969)
- Bernard Möller (1969–1999)
- Wim Eijk (1999–2007), appointed Archbishop of Utrecht (elevated to Cardinal in 2012)
- Gerard de Korte (2008–2016), appointed Bishop of ’s-Hertogenbosch
- Cornelis van den Hout (2017–2024), appointed Bishop of Roermond
- Ronald Cornelissen (2025–present)

== See also ==
- Roman Catholic Diocese of Leeuwarden
- Catholic Church in the Netherlands

== Sources and external links ==
- Official website (in Dutch)
- GCatholic.org - data for all sections
