= Hendrik van Cuyk =

Hendrik van Cuyk or Henricus Cuyckius (1546–1609) was the second bishop of Roermond from 1596 until his death in 1609.

== Life ==
Cuyk was born in Culemborg, in the Duchy of Guelders, in 1546. His grammar education began in Utrecht under Macropedius and was completed in the Jesuit college in Leuven. He enrolled for the Bachelor of Arts degree at the University of Leuven as a student in Lily College, graduating top of his year in 1566. He graduated Licentiate of Sacred Theology in 1575, and lectured on dogmatic theology and sacred scripture at St Martin's Abbey and St. Gertrude's Abbey, Leuven. He edited a volume of the works of John Cassian that was printed at the Plantin Press in 1578, and two treatises of St Bernard that were printed by Plantin in 1579.

In 1582 Cuyk was appointed professor of moral philosophy at the university. He graduated Doctor of Sacred Theology in 1584. In 1590 Philip II of Spain sought to nominate him to the diocese of Roermond, but he refused the preferment. During the 1590s he edited two works by Joannes Molanus for posthumous publication, Militia sacra ducum et principum Brabantiae (1592) and Natales Sanctorum Belgii (1595). Only in 1596, after repeated pressing, was he willing to accept episcopal appointment. He was consecrated bishop by Mathias Hovius in Leuven on 30 July 1596, and entered his see a few days later.

Cuyk was a major contributor to the Malines Catechism that was used throughout the archdiocese of Mechelen from 1608 onwards. He died in Roermond on 27 September 1609.

== Works ==
- Paraenetica De Henrico Bochorinck Desertore Catholicae religionis (Antwerp, Jan van Keerbergen, 1595) Available on Google Books
- Epistola paranetica ad Mauritium comitem Nassavium (Leuven, Joannes Masius, 1599) Available on Google Books
  - Ermanungschreiben An den Hochgebornen Herren Graf Moritzen von Nassaw (Ingolstadt, Adam Sartorius, 1600) Available on Google Books
- Ad Mauritium Comitem Nassauium secunda paraenetica epistola (Leuven, Joannes Masius, 1600) Available on Google Books
- Epistola expostulatoria ad Nystadiensis oppidi in Palatinatu praefectos (Roermond, Petrus Nicolaus, 1601) Available on Google Books
- Ad Florentium a Pallandt Comitem Culenburgensem paraenetica epistola (Leuven, Joannes Masius, 1601) Available on Google Books
- Speculum concubinariorum sacerdotum, monachorum, clericorum (Cologne, Bernardus Gualtherus, 1599; Leuven, Joannes Masius, 1601) Available on Google Books
- De Novi Testamenti sacrificio, sermones XX (Liège, Arnoldus de Corswaremia, 1604) High quality digitalization by KU Leuven - (Liège, Arnoldus de Corswaremia, 1605) Available on Google Books
- Ad S.P.Q. Culenburgensem Parenetica Epistola (Liège, Arnoldus de Corswaremia, 1605) Available on Google Books
- Epistolae paranetica tres ('s-Hertogenbosch, Scheffer, 1609)

Catholic Church titles
Preceded by William Damasus Lindanus	Bishop of Roermond; 1596–1609	Succeeded by Jacob van den Borgh
