= Philippe Bär =

Catholic bishop (1928–2025)

His Excellency Philippe Bär
- Bishop Emeritus of Rotterdam
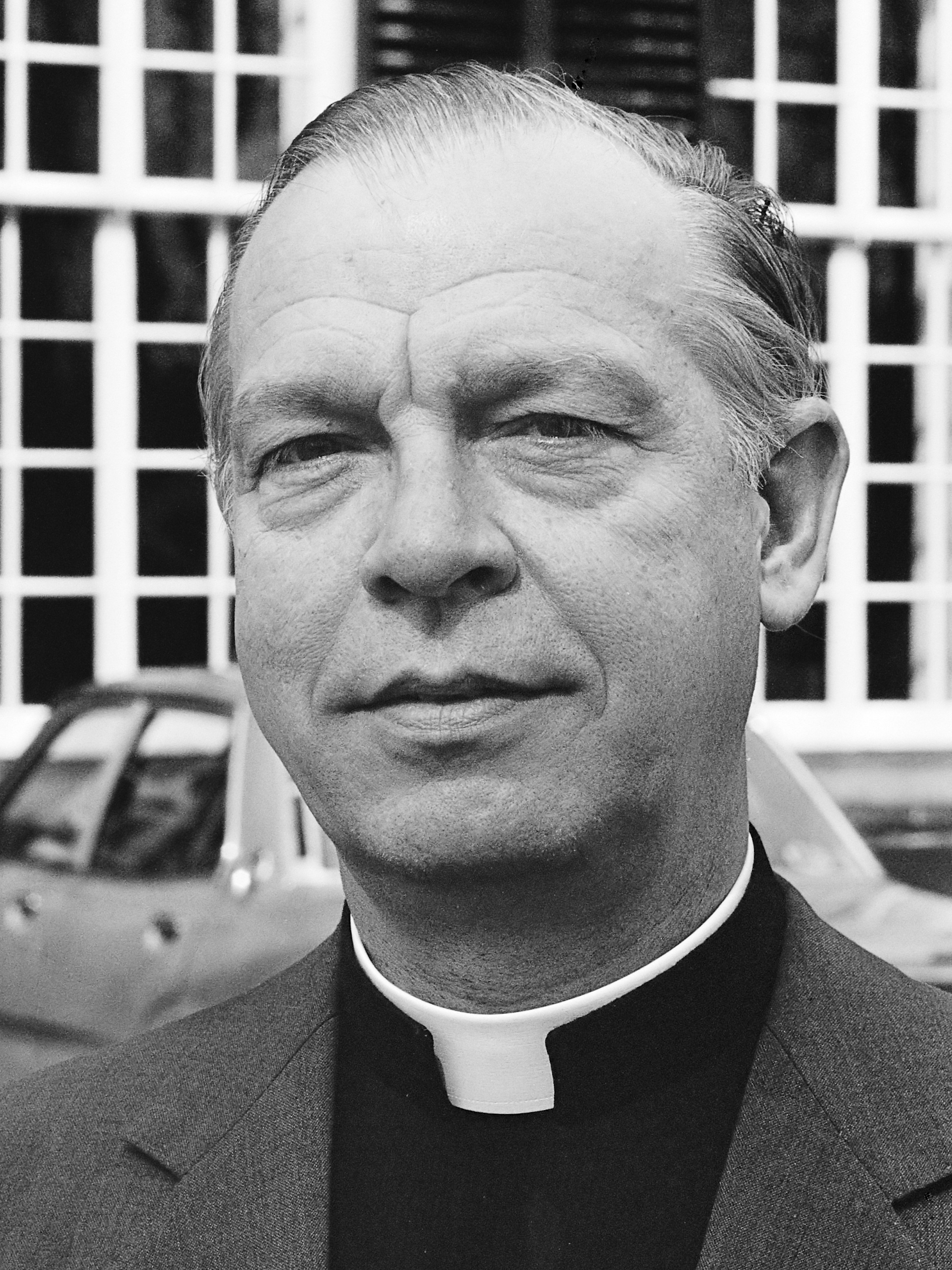
- Bär in 1982
- Archdiocese: Utrecht
- Diocese: Rotterdam
- Appointed: 22 November 1982
- Term ended: 13 March 1993
- Predecessor: Adrianus Johannes Simonis
- Successor: Ad van Luyn
- Other post: Ordinary of the Military Ordinariate of the Netherlands (1982–1993)
- Previous posts: Auxiliary Bishop of Rotterdam and Titular Bishop of Leges (1982–1983)

Orders
- Ordination: 26 July 1959
- Consecration: 20 March 1982 by Adrianus Johannes Simonis

Personal details
- Born: 29 July 1928 Manado, Dutch East Indies
- Died: 8 March 2025 (aged 96) Teteringen, Netherlands

Ronald Philippe Bär (29 July 1928 – 8 March 2025) was a Dutch Roman Catholic prelate who was bishop of the Diocese of Rotterdam from 19 October 1983 to 13 March 1993, as well as bishop of the Dutch military ordinariate. He resigned unexpectedly amid rumours of homosexual contacts.

== Background ==
Bär was born in Manado, North Sulawesi, then part of the Dutch East Indies, on 29 July 1928. During the Second World War, he was separated from his parents and detained in a Japanese internment camp.His parents were part of the Protestant Dutch Reformed Church. After World War II, Bär moved to the Netherlands and studied Protestant theology at Utrecht University. He was briefly a member of the Old Catholic Church. At the seminary, he was in the same class as Antonius Jan Glazemaker, the later Archbishop of Utrecht.

In 1954, Bär joined the Benedictine ministry Chevetogne Abbey as a monk, choosing the religious name Philippe. He died in Teteringen on 8 March 2025, at the age of 96.

== Roman Catholic sex abuse case ==
In 2011, Bär's name was mentioned in connection with a sex abuse case involving a Roman Catholic priest, who reportedly abused dozens of children in the period from 1987 to 2008: "The cardinal (Cardinal Simonis) was told by the then bishop of Rotterdam, Philippe Bär, that the priest had sexually abused underage boys in his parish in Zoetermeer. Bishop Bär wanted the priest out of his diocese. Archbishop Simonis then arranged for the man to be moved to a parish in Amersfoort."

== See also ==
- Cardinal Adrianus Johannes Simonis

Catholic Church titles
Preceded by Johannes Willebrands	Ordinary of the Military Ordinariate of the Netherlands; 1982–1993	Succeeded by Sede vacante since 1993
Preceded by Adrianus Johannes Simonis	Bishop of Rotterdam; 1982–1993	Succeeded by Adrianus van Luyn
Preceded by Paolo Mosconi	Titular Bishop of Leges; 1982–1993	Succeeded by Michael Smith
