= Johannes Wilhelmus Maria Liesen =

20th and 21st-century Dutch Catholic bishop

The Most Reverend Johannes Wilhelmus Maria Liesen
- Bishop of Breda
- Church: Roman Catholic Church
- Archdiocese: Roman Catholic Archdiocese of Utrecht
- Diocese: Roman Catholic Diocese of Breda
- See: Titular See of Turres Concordiae
- In office: November 26, 2011 -
- Predecessor: Hans van den Hende

Orders
- Ordination: June 16, 1984 by Joannes Gijsen
- Consecration: September 18, 2010 by Antonius Lambertus Maria Hurkmans

Personal details
- Born: 17 September 1960 Oosterhout, Netherlands
- Motto: Deus Providebit (God will Provide)
- Coat of arms

Johannes (Jan) Wilhelmus Maria Liesen (born in Oosterhout, North Brabant, Netherlands on 17 September 1960) is a Dutch clergyman and bishop of the Roman Catholic Church, being appointed on November 26, 2011, by Pope Benedict XVI to the Roman Catholic Diocese of Breda.

== Youth and education ==
Johannes Liesen grew up on a farm in Oosterhout, Netherlands. After graduating from St. Oelbertgymnasium in Oosterhout (1972-1978), Liesen studied from 1978 to 1983 at the major seminary in Rolduc abbey, Kerkrade. He claimed to have hesitated between a career in mathematics and seminary. For fellow, he was a source of information for all of their computer problems. After the diaconate, Liesen worked in the parish Saint John the Baptist in Eygelshoven.

== Priest and further education ==
On June 16, 1984, Liesen was ordained by Bishop of Roermond diocese, Joannes Gijsen, and he was appointed as chaplain in Eygelshoven. Shortly thereafter Liesen received an assignment and earned a doctorate in Pontifical Biblical Institute. He also studied at the Pontifical Biblical Institute in Jerusalem (1985-1990) and holds a doctorate in Biblical Studies (SSD, 1998). From 1990 to date, Liesen has taught exegesis, biblical theology and Hebrew Bible studies at the major seminary of the Roman Catholic Diocese of Roermond at Rolduc and Kerkrade. Since 1996 he is also librarian of the academic library. He has also taught at Hebrew Bible exegesis and the seminaries of the Roman Catholic Diocese of Haarlem (2000-2003) and the Roman Catholic Diocese of 's-Hertogenbosch (2001-2006).

== Auxiliary Bishop ==
On July 15, 2010, Liesen was — together with bishop Robertus Gerardus Leonia Maria Mutsaerts - appointed auxiliary bishop of the diocese of 's-Hertogenbosch. He was also appointed titular bishop of Tunnuna. The consecration took place on September 18, 2010, by bishops Antonius Lambertus Maria Hurkmans, Frans Wiertz and Joseph Frans Lescrauwaet.

== Bishop ==
On November 26, 2011, it was officially announced that Liesen was appointed bishop of the Roman Catholic Diocese of Breda. His name circulated for some time. Liesen's predecessor, Hans van den Hende moved to the Roman Catholic Diocese of Rotterdam. On January 28, 2012, Liesen was installed as bishop in a celebration at Saint Anthony Cathedral in Breda. Liesen chose the motto Providebit Deus (God will provide), the only word to Isaac said when Abraham was worried about what was the sacrificial lamb (Genesis 22). According to Liesen he was just as sweet remained in Eygelshoven pastor and he had not asked for further study. He also said that to be bishop had never been his ambition.

Liesen is responsible for universities and other education, pastoral categorical (hospitals and nursing homes), religious, new ecclesial movements, welfare and permanent formation of priests and deacons and the formation of pastoral workers and pastoral assistants. As chairman of the nominating committee, he prepares the appointment of priests and deacons and for the mission of pastoral workers.
