= Angelus d'Ongnies =

Dutch Catholic bishop (1650–1722)

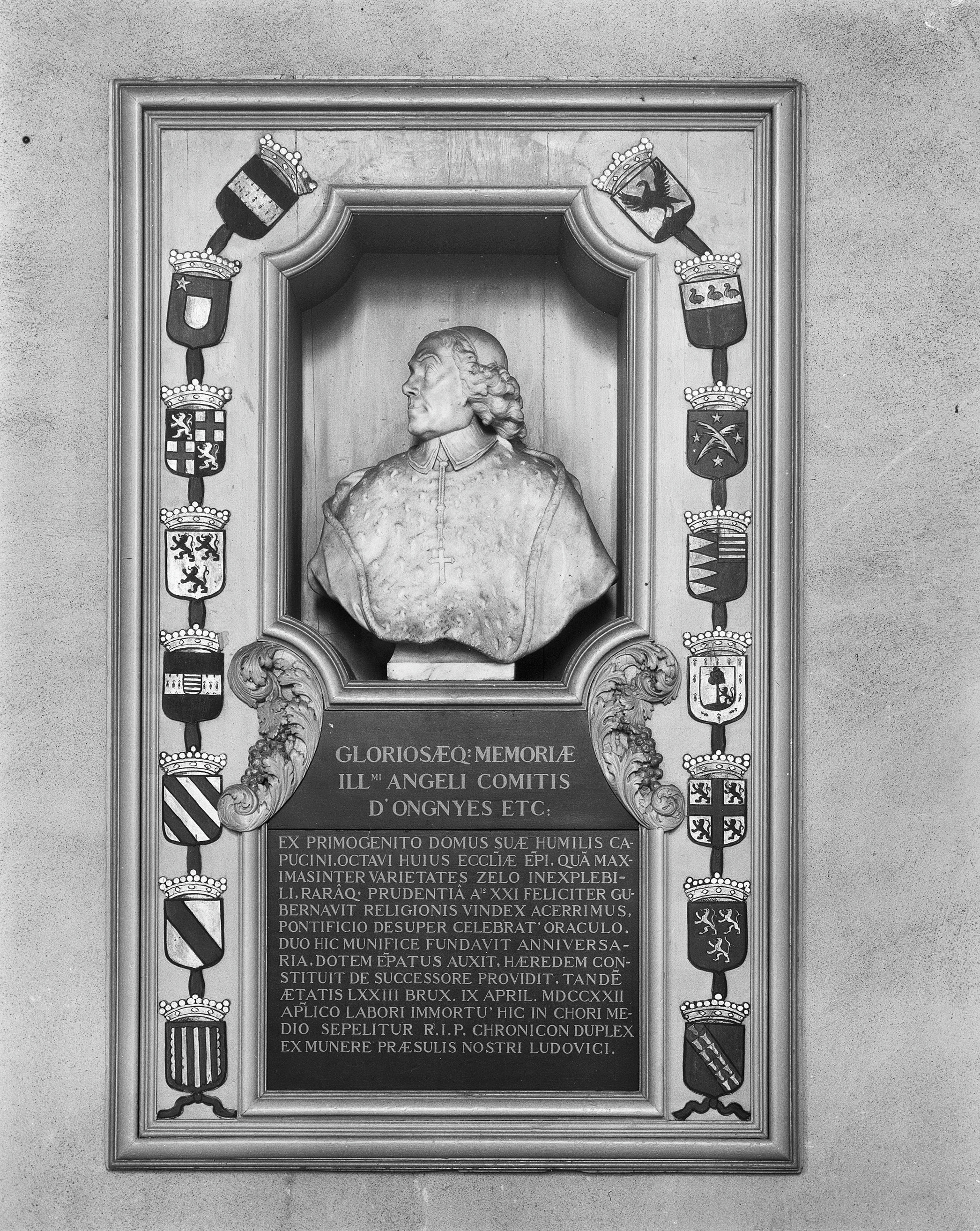
Memorial to Angelus d'Ongnies in Roermond

Alonso, Angelus or Ange d'Ongnies (1650–1722) was a Capuchin friar from the Spanish Netherlands who became bishop of Roermond.

== Life ==
Alonso d'Ongnies was born on 18 December 1650 in Hoboken, just outside Antwerp, the eldest son of Charles Philippe Joseph d'Ongnies, Count of Estrées, and Lady Marie-Marguerite Schetz d'Ursel. He was baptised shortly after birth by the midwife, who feared the baby might not survive, and was conditionally rebaptised in Brussels Minster on 11 May 1651.

In 1668 he renounced his noble titles and estates, with an annual income of 10,000 crowns, to join the Capuchin order. He was clothed as a Capuchin in London on 16 December 1668, and took the name in religion Angelus of Brussels. He was tonsured and received minor orders at Ypres on 16 December 1667; was ordained deacon in Bruges on 25 February 1673; and priest at Cambrai on 13 February 1674, with special dispensation from Pope Clement X for being under the canonical age of 25. At the same time, he was pursuing theological studies from 1672 to 1676.

From 1677 he was living at his order's house in Bruges, serving as a confessor to female orders and as a preacher in both French and Dutch. From October 1683 to April 1684 he was in Rome. In 1685 he was appointed preacher to the court in Brussels, providing the sermons for Advent and Lent. His effectiveness as a preacher and his noble family led to him being nominated bishop of Roermond on 28 February 1701. His appointment received papal confirmation on 21 November 1701, and he was consecrated as bishop in the Capuchin church in Brussels on 1 January 1702.

As bishop he was particularly preoccupied by the poverty of his diocese and by the depradations of troops marching through during the War of the Spanish Succession. He was opposed to Jansenism and very quickly published the papal bull Unigenitus (1713) condemning it.

He died in Brussels on 9 April 1722, while staying with his nephew, the Duke of Ursel. A funeral monument with a marble bust was installed in Roermond Cathedral in his memory.
