= Jacobus a Castro =

Dutch Bishop (1560–1639)

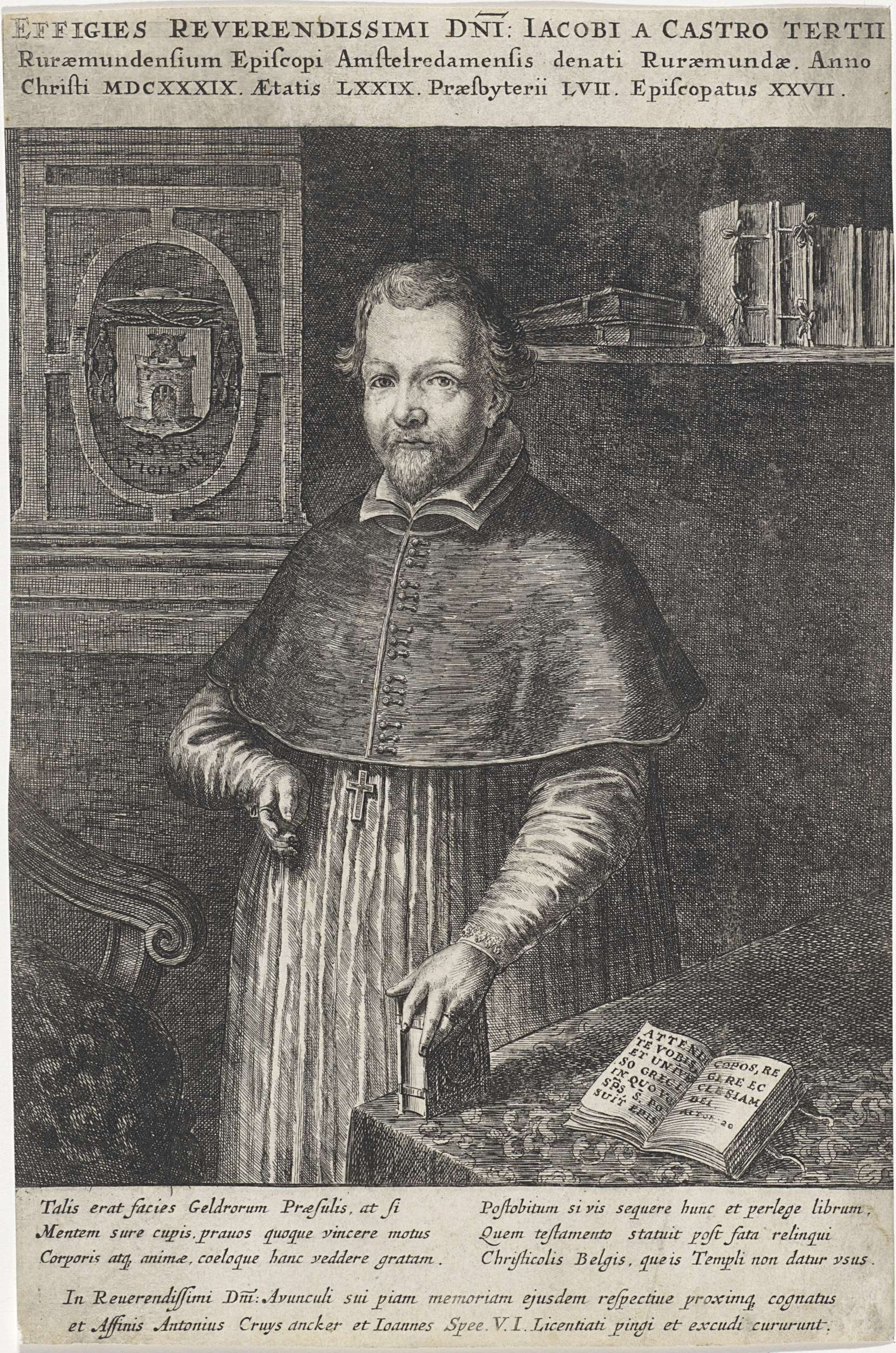
- Print portrait of Jacobus a Castro published by Abraham Dircksz Santvoort
- Native name: Jacob van der Borgh
- Diocese: Roermond
- Appointed: 20 March 1610
- Predecessor: Hendrik van Cuyk (1596–1609)
- Successor: Henricus Calenus

Orders
- Ordination: 1585
- Consecration: 11 April 1611

Personal details
- Born: 1560 Amsterdam, County of Holland, Habsburg Netherlands
- Died: 1639 (aged 78–79) Roermond, Duchy of Guelders, Spanish Netherlands
- Parents: Gerard Pietersz. van der Borgh, Anna Janssen du Bois
- Education: philosophy and theology
- Alma mater: Leuven University
- Motto: Esto Vigilans

Jacob van der Borgh (1560–1639), Latinized Jacobus a Castro, was the third bishop of Roermond, in the Netherlands.

== Life ==
Jacobus a Castro was born in Amsterdam in 1560, the son of Gerard Pietersz. van der Borgh and Anna Janssen du Bois.

Castro studied philosophy and theology at Leuven University. In 1579 he graduated in philosophy at the top of his year and was appointed a lecturer in Pig College (Pedagogie Het Varken). Among the students that he taught there were Jacobus Boonen, a later archbishop of Mechelen, and Petrus Peckius the Younger, a later Chancellor of Brabant. He was appointed professor of theology in Leuven on 22 August 1594.

In 1610, Castro was named to the see of Roermond, and consecrated bishop in 1611. He invited the Jesuits to establish their first presence in the city, giving them his own house for the purpose. He almost immediately issued diocesan injunctions regarding superstitious practices. These may have contributed to the social atmosphere surrounding the large-scale Roermond witch trials of 1613–1614, although he was not himself involved in prosecutions for witchcraft and the Roermond outbreak was part of a larger witch craze that affected several different secular and ecclesiastical jurisdictions along the River Maas.

From 1632 to 1637 Roermond was occupied by the States and the cathedral was turned over to Protestant worship. Castro remained in the city, and risked his own life to tend the sick during the epidemics of 1634 and 1635.

He died in Roermond on 24 February 1639. A volume of 110 of his sermons was printed posthumously in 1649.

== Writings ==
- Regnum Christi, dat is het Rijck Christi, vervangen in hondert en tien stichtelijke en seer geleerde sermonen, achtergelaten, tot bezonderen troost van alle oprechte catholycke zielen en de grondelijcke wederlegginge tegen de opwerpselen van onse wederpartye int stuck van geloof (Roermond, 1649)

Catholic Church titles
Preceded by Hendrik van Cuyk	Bishop of Roermond; 1611–1639	Succeeded by Andreas Creusen
