= Johannes Knijff =

Dutch Roman Catholic bishop

The Most Reverend Johannes Knijff O.F.M.
- Bishop of Groningen
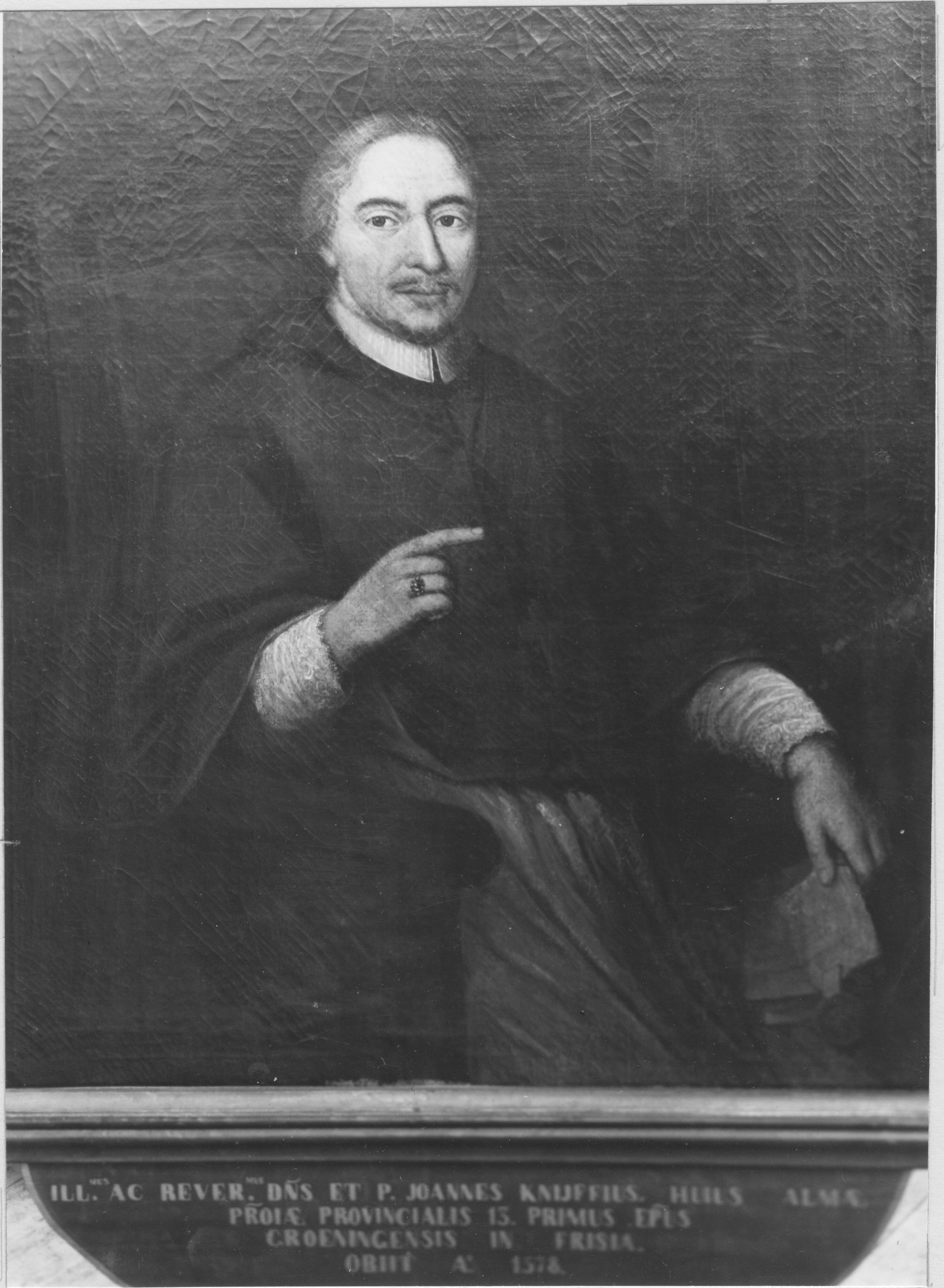
- Posthumous portrait of Johannes Knijff (1625)
- Appointed: 8 August 1561
- Installed: 3 October 1568
- Term ended: 7 October 1576
- Predecessor: Diocese established
- Successor: Jan van Bruhesen

Orders
- Consecration: 5 December 1563 by Antoine Perrenot de Granvelle

Personal details
- Died: 7 October 1576 Groningen
- Education: University of Leuven

Johannes Knijff, O.F.M. (also Johann Knijff or Joannes Knijff Ius, Utrecht,? – Groningen, 7 October 1576) was the first bishop of the Diocese of Groningen.

He was a Franciscan who had studied at Leuven. In 1561, he was appointed bishop of the newly established diocese of Groningen. He was consecrated bishop by Cardinal Granvelle in Brussels on 5 December 1563. Groningen resisted the arrival of a bishop. It was not until 1568, that Knijff, supported by Alva's troops, could take his diocese in the cathedral. In 1576, he died of the plague. Due to the fear of infection, the deceased bishop was buried quickly and without much ceremony in a free grave in the ambulatory east of the altar. Later, his remains were exhumed and placed in a crypt under the choir. Not a stone or a grave monument has been preserved.

Although a successor was appointed after his death, Knijff was, in fact, the only bishop who exercised the office in Groningen until the re-establishment of the diocese in 1956.

Catholic Church titles
Preceded by Diocese established	Bishop of Groningen; 1561–1576	Succeeded by Jan van Bruhesen
