= Harrie Smeets =

Dutch Roman Catholic prelate (1960–2023)

His Excellency Harrie Smeets
- Bishop Emeritus of Roermond
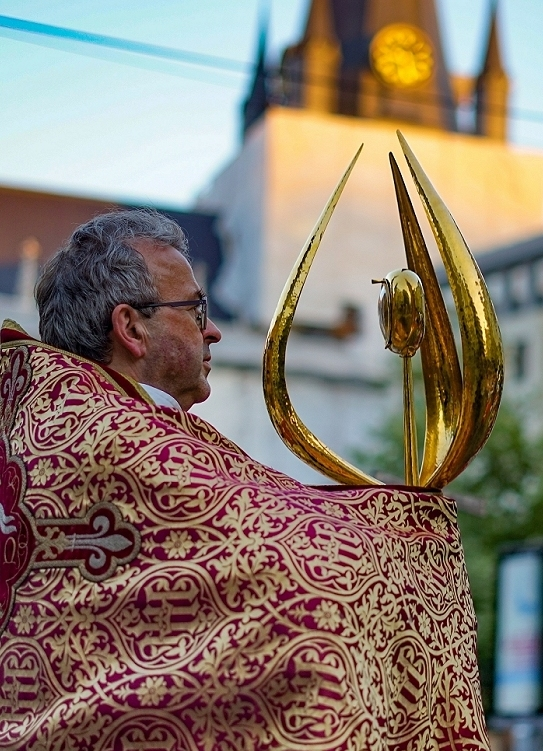
- Metropolis: Utrecht
- Appointed: 10 October 2018
- Term ended: 10 August 2023
- Predecessor: Frans Wiertz
- Successor: Ron van den Hout

Orders
- Ordination: 13 June 1992
- Consecration: 8 December 2018 by Hans van den Hende

Personal details
- Born: Hendrikus Marie Gerardus Smeets; 22 October 1960 Heerlen, Netherlands
- Died: 20 December 2023 (aged 63) Roermond, Netherlands
- Motto: IN GODS NAAM MENSEN LIEFHEBBEN
- Coat of arms

Styles of Harrie Smeets
- Reference style: His Excellency; The Most Reverend
- Spoken style: Your Excellency
- Religious style: Bishop

Hendrikus Marie Gerardus 'Harrie' Smeets (22 October 1960 – 20 December 2023) was a Dutch Roman Catholic prelate who was bishop of Roermond from 2018 to 2023. He died of a brain tumor on 20 December 2023, at the age of 63.

Catholic Church titles
Preceded by Frans Wiertz	Bishop of Roermond; 2018–2023	Succeeded by Ron van den Hout
