= St. Christopher's Cathedral, Roermond =

Catholic church in the Netherlands

St. Christopher's Cathedral (Sint-Christoffelkathedraal)
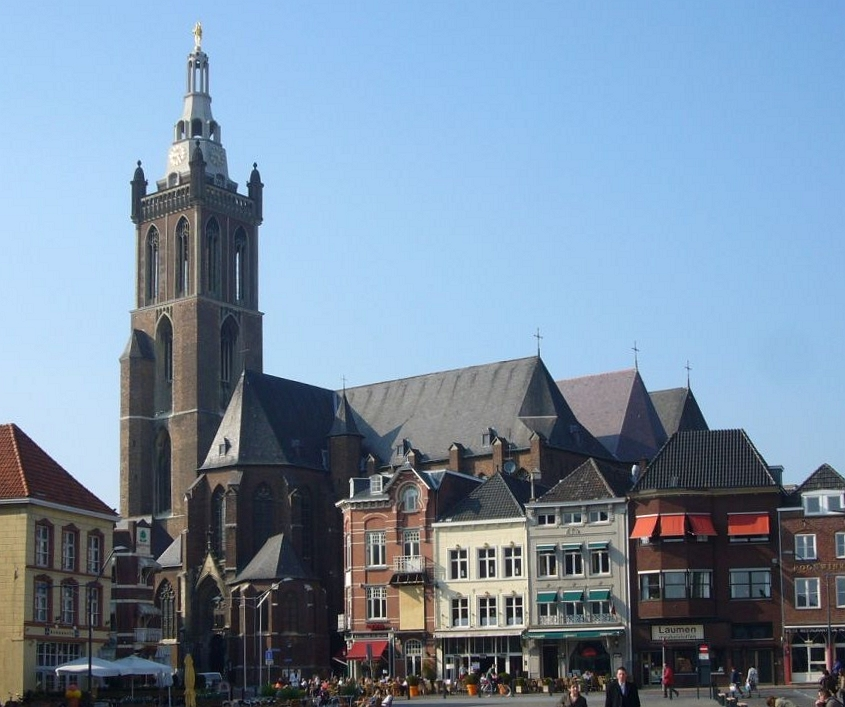
- The cathedral, as seen from the market place

Religion
- Affiliation: Roman Catholic
- Province: Diocese of Roermond

Location
- Location: Roermond, The Netherlands
- Interactive map of St. Christopher's Cathedral (Sint-Christoffelkathedraal)
- Coordinates: 51.1964°N 5.9846°E

Architecture
- Type: Church
- Style: Gothic
- Groundbreaking: 1410
- Height (max): 85 m

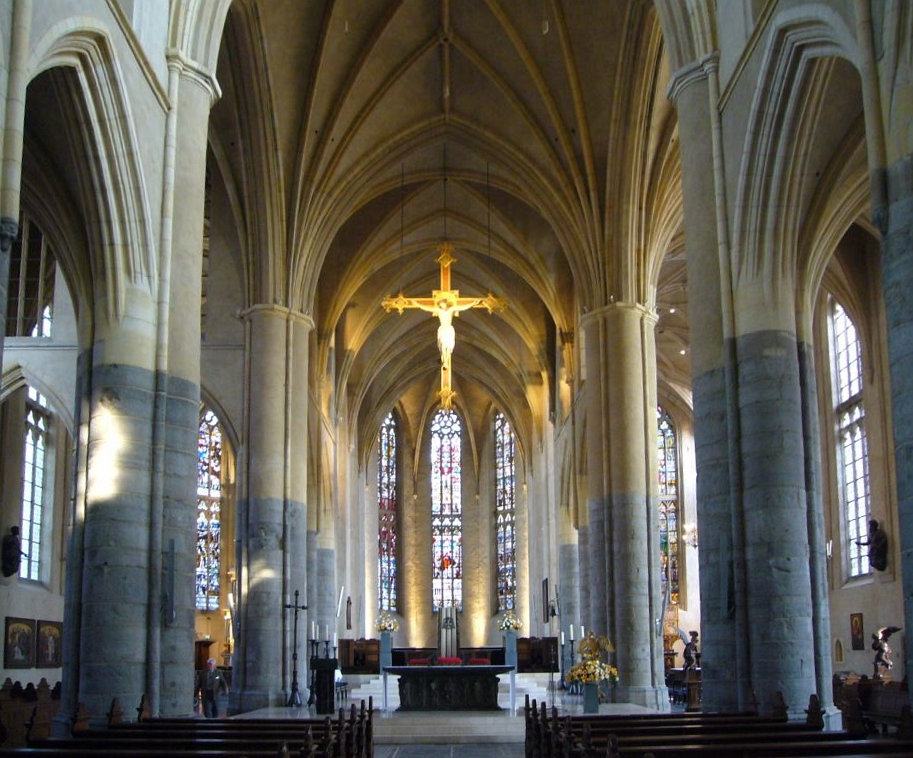
Cathedral interior

St. Christopher's Cathedral in the Dutch city of Roermond is the main church of the Roman Catholic Diocese of Roermond. It is dedicated to Saint Christopher and has been designated as a national monument by the Dutch state.

== Location ==
The cathedral is located on the market square, near the river Meuse and a Meuse fortress, on a pedestrian underpass leading to the outlet Centre.

== History ==
The construction of the Christoffelkerk, which began in 1410 and was initially designed as a basilica on a cruciform ground plan, was intended to replace an older parish church outside the walls of the town of Roermond. During the 15th century the building plans were changed; the choir was completed as a three-aisled hall, the nave was built with five naves. The building was completed in the course of the 16th century. In 1661 the church was elevated to the status of bishop's church of the Roman Catholic Diocese of Roermond, established in 1559. The building includes stained glass by Dutch artist Joep Nicolas.

In World War II the church suffered heavy damage when German troops blew up the 78-metre-high tower built into the western part of the nave on the day before the liberation of the town by Allied troops. The tower has been restored to its old form after the war.

On 13 April 1992, the cathedral sustained structural damage during the Roermond earthquake. A major comprehensive restoration campaign took place between 2005 and 2007 to repair seismic damage and restore the cathedral's artwork and masonry.

== See also ==
- List of tallest structures built before the 20th century
