= Wim Eijk =

Dutch Catholic prelate (born 1953)

His Eminence Willem Jacobus Eijk
- Cardinal, Archbishop of Utrecht; Primate of the Netherlands
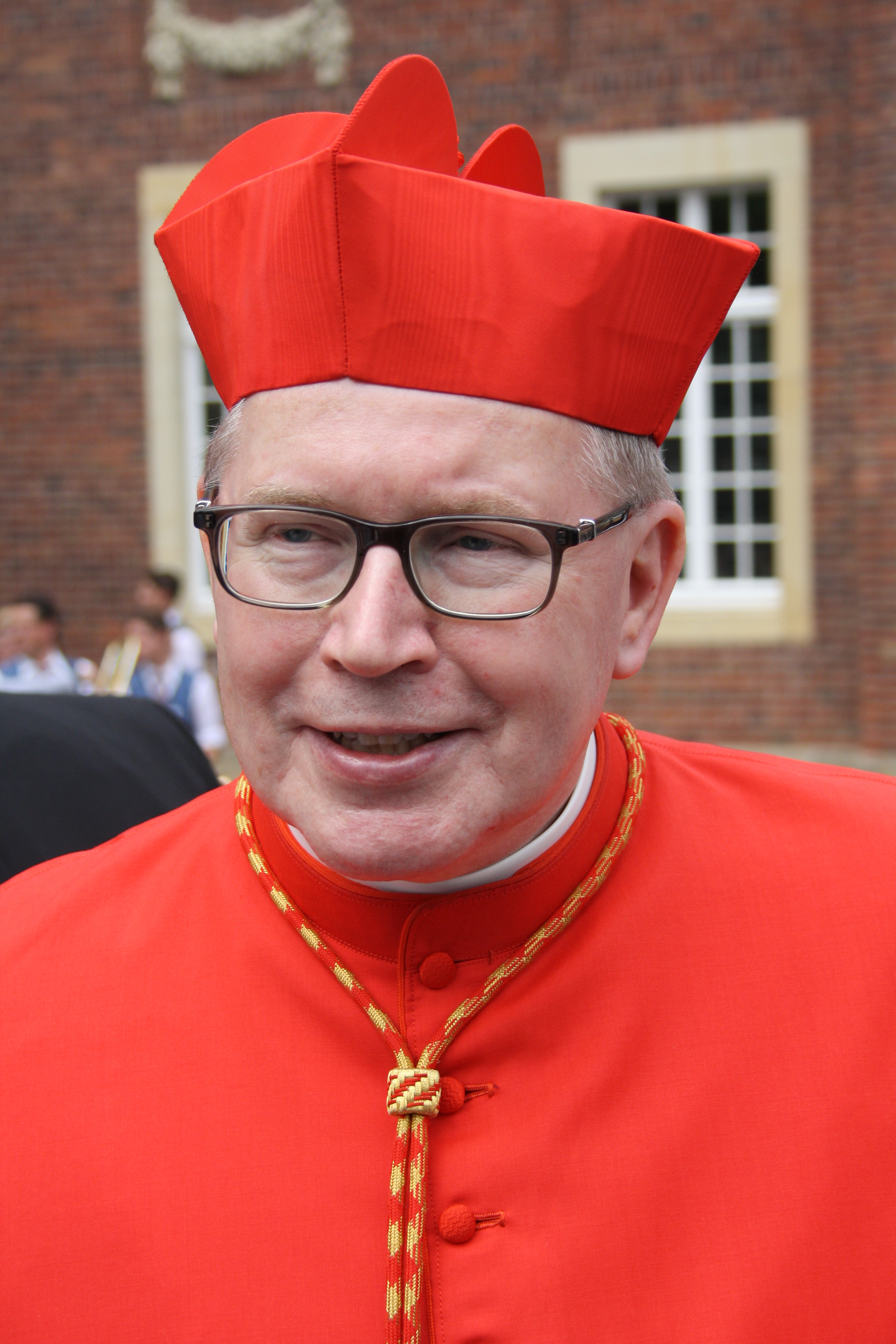
- Cardinal Eijk.
- Church: Catholic
- Archdiocese: Utrecht
- Appointed: 11 December 2007
- Installed: 26 January 2008
- Predecessor: Adrianus Johannes Simonis
- Other posts: President of the Bishops' Conference of the Netherlands; Cardinal-Priest of San Callisto (2012‍–‍present)
- Previous post: Bishop of Groningen-Leeuwarden (1999‍–‍2007)

Orders
- Ordination: 1 June 1985 by Joannes Baptist Matthijs Gijsen
- Consecration: 6 November 1999 by Adrianus Johannes Simonis
- Created cardinal: 18 February 2012 by Benedict XVI
- Rank: Cardinal-Priest

Personal details
- Born: Willem Jacobus Eijk; 22 June 1953 (age 73) Duivendrecht, Netherlands
- Education: University of Amsterdam (Medicine); Rolduc (Seminary); Leiden University (MD, Medicine); Pontifical University of St. Thomas Aquinas (PhD, Philosophy); Pontifical Lateran University (Licentiate, Theology)
- Motto: Noli Recusare Laborem (Latin for 'Do Not Reject the Work')

Styles of Wim Eijk
- Reference style: His Eminence
- Spoken style: Your Eminence
- Religious style: Cardinal
- Informal style: Cardinal

Ordination history of Wim Eijk
History
Diaconal ordination
- Ordained by: Joannes Baptist Matthijs Gijsen
Priestly ordination
- Ordained by: Joannes Baptist Matthijs Gijsen
Episcopal consecration
- Principal consecrator: Adrianus Johannes Simonis
- Co-consecrators: Franciscus Jozef Maria Wiertz, Sergio Lasam Utleg
Episcopal succession
Bishops consecrated by Wim Eijk as principal consecrator
- Herman Woorts: 2010
- Ted Hoogenboom: 2010
- Ronald Cornelissen: 2025

Willem Jacobus "Wim" Eijk (born 22 June 1953) is a Dutch prelate of the Catholic Church, a cardinal since 2012. He has been the Metropolitan Archbishop of Utrecht since 2007. He was Bishop of Groningen-Leeuwarden from 1999 to 2007. Before his clerical career, he worked as a medical doctor; as a priest, he made medical ethics the focus of his academic studies. He has done his doctoral studies in medicine and philosophy, and also holds a licentiate in theology.

== Early life and studies ==
Willem Jacobus Eijk was born on 22 June 1953 in Duivendrecht, North Holland, Netherlands and was raised by a Protestant father and a Catholic mother.

Eijk studied medicine at the University of Amsterdam and received his degree in 1978. In 1978 and 1979 he worked as a doctor specializing in internal medicine. He studied for the priesthood at the seminary of Rolduc in Kerkrade. Beginning in 1979 he combined his theological formation with the study of medical ethics at Leiden University. He was ordained to the priesthood in 1985 and was incardinated in the Diocese of Roermond. Then he went to work as a curate in the parish of St. Anthony of Padua in Venlo Blerick.

In 1987, he earned a doctorate in medicine from the University of Leiden, with a dissertation about euthanasia. In 1990 he completed a PhD in philosophy at the Pontifical University of St. Thomas Aquinas (Angelicum) with a dissertation entitled The ethical problems of genetic engineering of human beings. Eijk also earned a licentiate in moral theology at the Pontifical Lateran University in Rome. At the same time he taught moral theology at the seminary of Rolduc. From 1996, Eijk was professor of moral theology in the Pontifical Faculty of Theology in Lugano, Switzerland. From 1997 to 1999 he was a member of the International Theological Commission.

== Bishop and Archbishop ==
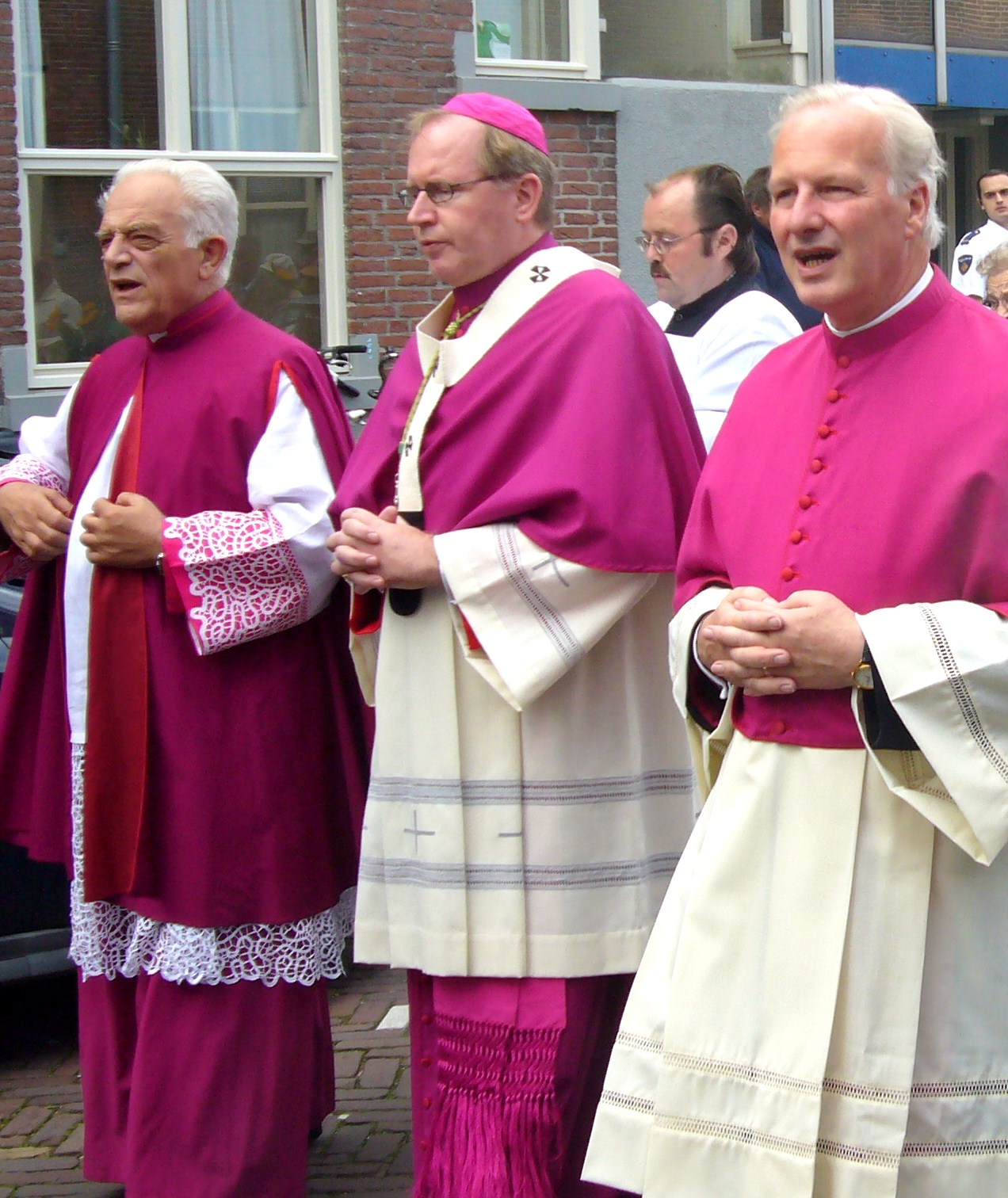
Archbishop Wim Eijk of Utrecht during the Willibrord Procession, 14 September 2008

Eijk was appointed Bishop of Groningen-Leeuwarden on 17 July 1999 and consecrated a bishop on 6 November. He chose the motto Noli recusare laborem ("Do not reject the work"), taken from the last words of Martin of Tours. As bishop, he restricted the role of the laity in church services in comparison with past practice. In 2001 Wim Eijk suffered from a subdural hematoma from which he fully recovered.

Pope John Paul II named him a member of the Pontifical Academy for Life on 4 August 2004 and a member of its governing council on 23 March 2005.

On 11 December 2007 Pope Benedict XVI appointed Eijk the Metropolitan Archbishop of Utrecht On 26 January 2008 he was installed in St. Catharine's Cathedral in Utrecht. He is the 70th successor of Saint Willibrord (658–739) as head of that see.

In May 2008, Pope Benedict appointed Eijk a member of the Congregation for the Clergy.

He co-edited the Manual of Catholic Medical Ethics: Responsible Healthcare from a Catholic Perspective, published in 2010.

He was elected president of the Episcopal Conference of the Netherlands in 2011.

On 18 February 2012, Pope Benedict XVI made Eijk a cardinal along with 21 others. He was created Cardinal-Priest of San Callisto. On 21 April he was named a member of the Congregation for Catholic Education. He was one of the cardinal electors who participated in the 2013 papal conclave that elected Pope Francis.

Pope Francis named him a member of the Pontifical Council for the Laity on 6 February 2014.

In late 2013, Pope Francis agreed to a one-day visit to Amsterdam, a city omitted from Pope John Paul's visit to the Netherlands in 1985, but allegedly Eijk blocked the formal invitation, afraid that there would not be enough enthusiastic Dutch followers to give the Pope a worthy welcome.

As Archbishop of Utrecht, he has recommended a restructuring of the diocese's 326 parishes into 48 territories, following a pattern throughout Europe in the face of shrinking church attendance. He has insisted of that plan despite some popular resistance. He said: "When I spoke to the pope, I warned that old church structures wouldn't exist by the time I retired – and that by 2025 two-thirds of our churches would have been withdrawn from divine worship.

He participated as a cardinal elector in the 2025 papal conclave that elected Pope Leo XIV.

=== Positions ===
In June 2015, Eijk ordered the removal of Rhianna Gralike, the transgender treasurer of the Norbertus Parish for eastern Flevoland and Northern Veluwe, over the objections of the parish board.

In 2015 Eijk was elected to represent the Episcopal Conference of the Netherlands at the Synod of Bishops on the Family in October. In advance of the Synod he published an essay stating that couples entering into a civil remarriage without having received annulments of earlier marriages represent "a form of structured and institutionalized adultery." Following the synod, he became a critic of Pope Francis' Amoris laetitia. In 2018, he said the document had "caused doubt to be sown" and said Francis should state more clearly that marriage is "one and unbreakable" and that a Catholic who remarries after divorce must be denied Communion.

In May 2018, after Pope Francis failed to reject a draft proposal on the part of the German Bishops' Conference to allow Protestants to receive the Eucharist in Catholic churches in certain cases, Eijk wrote that Francis was failing to defend "the clear doctrine and practice of the Church" and that this represented "a drift towards apostasy from the Truth".

An article in the weekly De Groene Amsterdammer of 22 September 1999, included the catholic historian and journalist Ton van Schaik who criticized the cardinal for his relations with the extremely conservative Spanish lay movement Opus Dei and because the cardinal was not dismissive of the death penalty. Van Schaik considered that, contrary to Catholic doctrine.

In 2022, Eijk published a book De band van de liefde: Katholieke huwelijksmoraal en seksuele ethiek (The Bond of Love: Catholic Marital Morality and Sexual Ethics), a work presenting the Catholic view that sexual activity within marriage has two inseparable purposes: the procreation of children and the unitive love between spouses ("mutual self-giving of man and woman"); and that outside of marriage or these purposes, chastity is required. The book also discusses various sexual acts in light of Catholic moral teaching. Critics say that Eijk's book shows he is more orthodox than the Catholic Church.

In November 2022, he asked Pope Francis to "issue an encyclical on gender thinking". His request was partially satisfied by the Declaration Dignitas Infinita of the Dicastery for the Doctrine of the Faith.

Catholic Church titles
Preceded by Bernard Möller	Bishop of Groningen-Leeuwarden; 17 July 1999 – 11 December 2007	Succeeded by Gerard de Korte
Preceded by Adrianus Johannes Simonis	Archbishop of Utrecht; 11 December 2007 – present	Incumbent
Preceded by Corrado Ursi	Cardinal-Priest of San Callisto; 18 February 2012 – present	Incumbent
