= Military Ordinariate of the Netherlands =

Roman Catholic ecclesiastical jurisdiction in the Netherlands

Military Ordinariate of the Netherlands Militair ordinariaat van Nederland

Catholic
- The Coat of Arms of the Military Ordinariate of the Netherlands

Location
- Country: Netherlands

Information
- Denomination: Roman Catholic
- Rite: Latin Rite
- Established: 16 April 1957 (69 years ago)

Current leadership
- Pope: Leo XIV
- Bishop: Sede Vacante
- Apostolic Administrator: Everardus Johannes de Jong

The Military Ordinariate of the Netherlands is a military ordinariate of the Roman Catholic Church. Immediately subject to the Holy See, it provides pastoral care to Roman Catholics serving in the Dutch Armed Forces and their families.

== History ==
It was established as a military vicariate on 16 April 1957 and elevated to a military ordinariate on 21 July 1986. Since 1993, no military ordinaries have been appointed.

== Office holders ==
=== Military vicars ===
- Bernard Jan Alfrink (appointed 1957 – retired 1975)
- Johannes Gerardus Maria Willebrands (appointed 6 December 1975 – resigned 22 November 1982)
- Ronald Philippe Bär, O.S.B. (appointed 22 November 1982 – became Military Ordinary 21 July 1986)

=== Military ordinaries ===
- Ronald Philippe Bär, O.S.B. (appointed 21 July 1986 – resigned 13 March 1993).

No military ordinaries appointed since 1993:

- Joseph Marianus Punt (appointed 1 April 1995 as apostolic administrator, - retired 1 June 2020).
- Everardus Johannes de Jong (appointed 1 June 2020 as apostolic administrator - now)

== See also ==
- Catholic Church in the Netherlands
