= Andreas Creusen =

Catholic archbishop (1591–1666)

- Archbishop of Mechelen
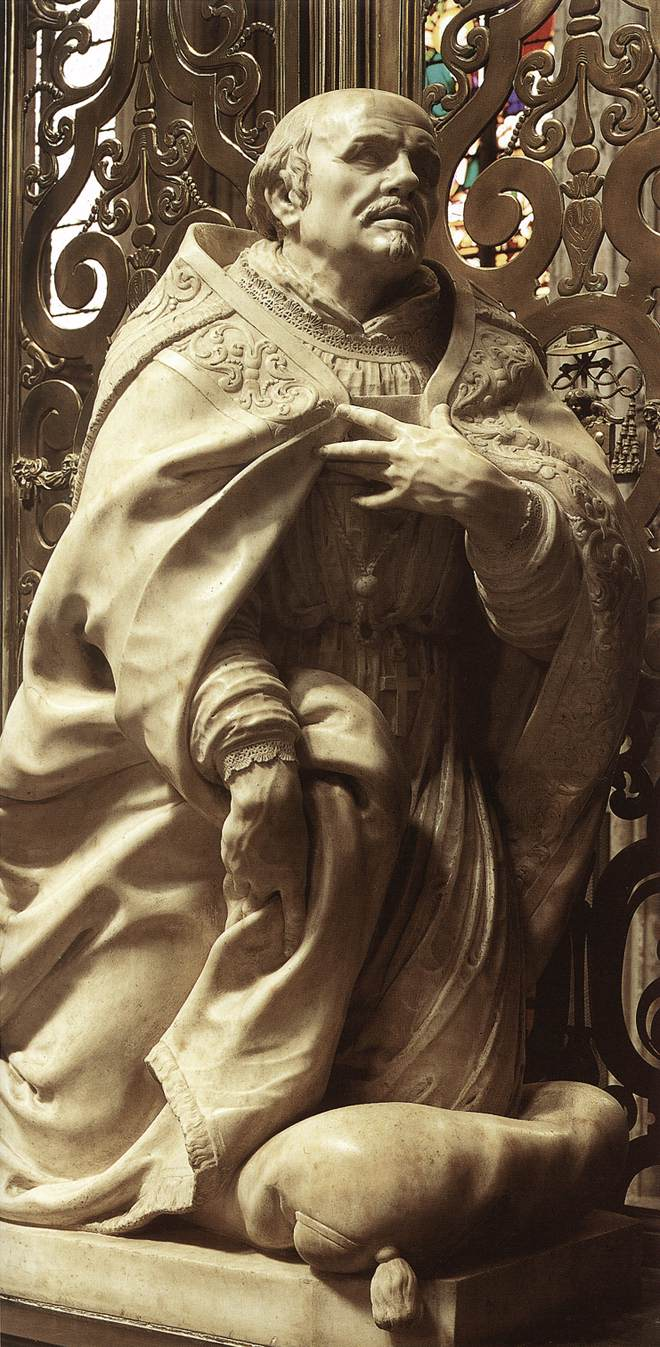
- Tomb of Archbishop Andreas Creusen at St. Rumbold's Cathedral, sculpted by Lucas Faydherbe (1660)
- Church: Catholic Church
- Archdiocese: Archdiocese of Mechelen
- In office: 9 April 1657 – 8 November 1666
- Predecessor: Jacobus Boonen
- Successor: Jean de Wachtendonck
- Previous post: Bishop of Roermond (1651-1657)

Orders
- Consecration: 23 July 1651 by Anthonius Triest

Personal details
- Born: 1591 Maastricht, Prince-Bishopric of Liège, Holy Roman Empire
- Died: 8 November 1666 (aged 74–75) Brussels, Duchy of Brabant, Spanish Netherlands

Andreas Creusen (1591 – November 8, 1666) was a Dutch Catholic clergyman and theologian. He was the Bishop of Roermond (1651–1657) and Archbishop of Mechelen (1657–1666). Creusen was also a concillor to the Holy Roman Emperor.

== Early life ==
Andreas Creusen was born in 1591 in Maastricht, Limburg, Netherlands. He studied at the Latin school and the Jesuit college in Maastricht, before completing further studies in Rome, Italy. Creusen obtained a doctoral degree in theology at the University of Vienna in Vienna, Austria.

== Career ==
Creusen became a clergyman and theologian with the Catholic Church. He was appointed a councillor to the Holy Roman Emperor and was also chaplain major to the Imperial Roman armies in Germany and Hungary.

After Creusen returned to the Low Countries, he was made a canon of Cambrai Cathedral in 1630. In 1640, he was appointed Archdeacon of Brabant, a state of the Holy Roman Empire. Creusen was appointed to be the Bishop of Roermond on 22 May 1651, and was consecrated on 23 July 1651.

Creusen was nominated as the Archbishop of Mechelen 6 September 1656, and his nomination confirmed on 9 April 1657. At a convocation of bishops held in the city of Brussels in January 1665, Creusen raised the issue of the abuse of the confessional and the power of absolution with regard to the confessor and his paramour. However, the issue was not resolved at the meeting.

== Death ==
Creusen died in Brussels on 8 November 1666. He was buried in the choir of St. Rumbold's Cathedral in Mechelen. His funeral monument was designed and executed by the sculptor Lucas Faydherbe.

Catholic Church titles
Preceded by Jacobus a Castro	Bishop of Roermond; 1651–1657	Succeeded by Eugène, Count d'Allamont
Preceded by Jacobus Boonen	5th Archbishop of Mechelen-Brussels; 1657–1666	Succeeded by Joannes Wachtendonck
