= St. Joseph Cathedral, Groningen =

St. Joseph Cathedral
- Sint-Jozef kathedraal
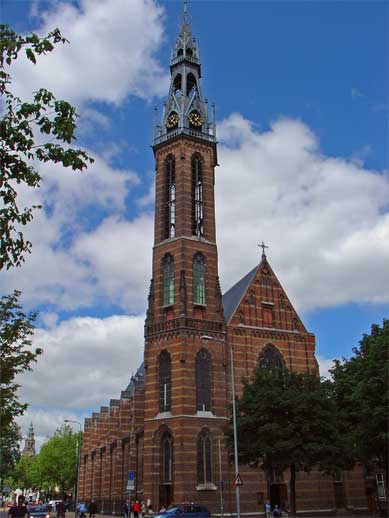

- Location within Groningen (province)
- 53.2147°N 6.5728°E
- Location: Groningen
- Country: Netherlands
- Denomination: Roman Catholic Church

The St. Joseph Cathedral (Dutch: Sint-Jozef kathedraal) is the cathedral of the Roman Catholic Diocese of Groningen-Leeuwarden in the city of Groningen in the Netherlands.

== Description ==
The parish church of St. Joseph (Sint-Jozef), was designed by Pierre Cuypers, with contributions by his son Joseph Cuypers. The church has a Neo-Gothic style and was built between 1885 and 1887 and consecrated on 25 May 1887. The church was dedicated to Saint Joseph, patron of workers, for the many workers who built the building. In 1906 the church was equipped with an organ built by the firm of Utrecht Maarschalkerweerd. The church was used as a parish church in 1970 and officially became the cathedral of the Diocese of Groningen-Leeuwarden in 1981.
