= Adrianus Johannes Simonis =

Catholic cardinal (1931–2020)

His Eminence Adrianus Johannes Simonis
- Cardinal; Archbishop Emeritus of Utrecht; Primate Emeritus of the Netherlands
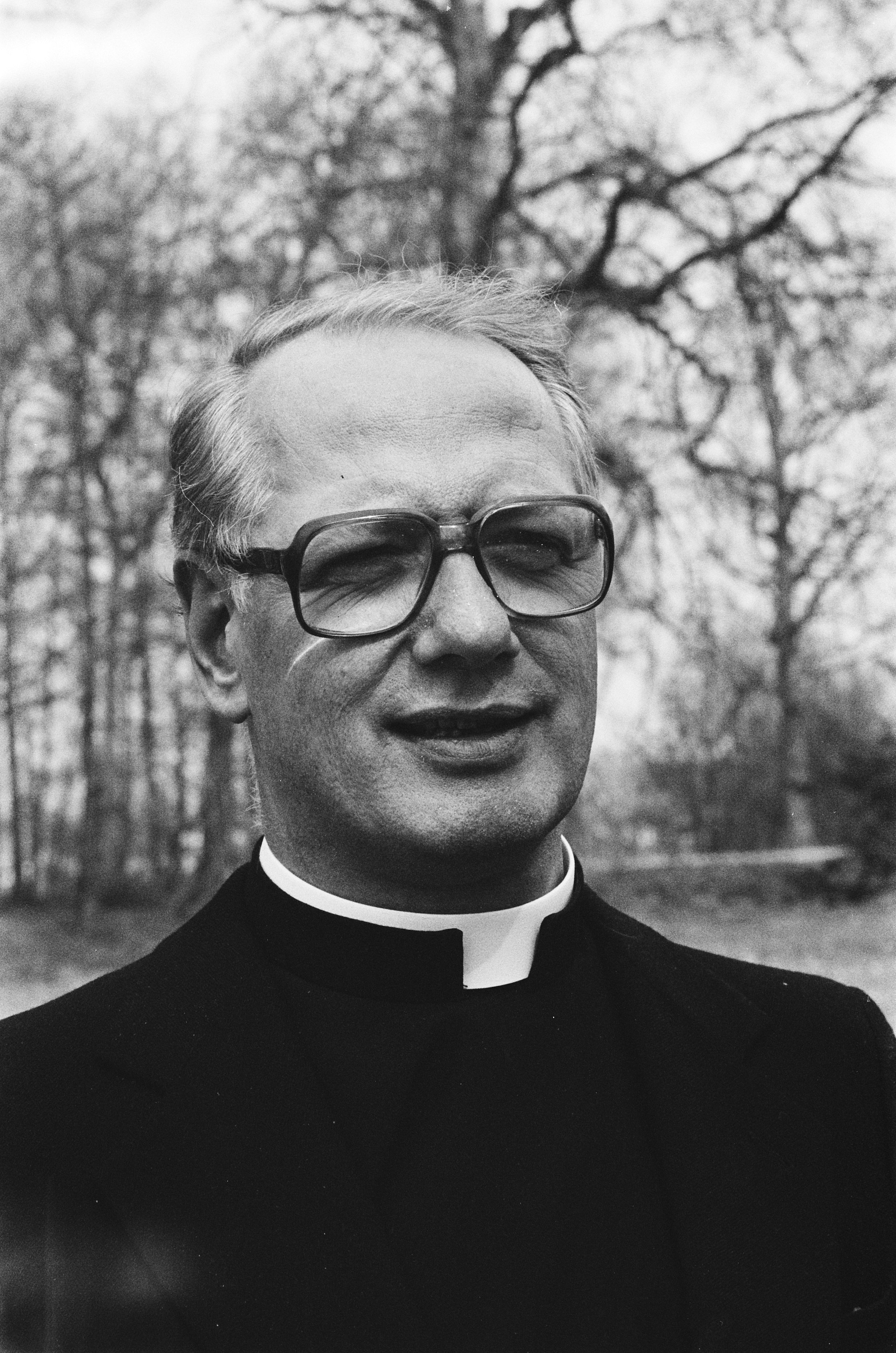
- Simonis in 1982
- See: Utrecht
- Installed: 3 December 1983
- Term ended: 14 April 2007
- Predecessor: Johannes Willebrands
- Successor: Wim Eijk
- Other post: Cardinal Priest of San Clemente
- Previous post: Bishop of Rotterdam (1970–1983)

Orders
- Ordination: 15 June 1957 by Martien Antoon Jansen
- Consecration: 20 March 1971 by Bernardus Johannes Alfrink
- Created cardinal: 25 May 1985 by John Paul II
- Rank: Cardinal priest

Personal details
- Born: 26 November 1931 Lisse, Netherlands
- Died: 2 September 2020 (aged 88) Voorhout, Netherlands
- Denomination: Roman Catholic
- Motto: Ut cognoscant te ('So that they may know you')

Ordination history of Adrianus Johannes Simonis
History
Episcopal consecration
- Consecrated by: Bernardus Johannes Alfrink (Utrecht)
- Date: 20 March 1971
Episcopal succession
Bishops consecrated by Adrianus Johannes Simonis as principal consecrator
- Philippe Bär: 20 March 1982
- Frans Wiertz: 25 September 1993
- Ad van Luyn: 12 February 1994
- Wim Eijk: 6 November 1999
- Gerard de Korte: 2 June 2001

Styles of Adrianus Johannes Simonis
- Reference style: His Eminence
- Spoken style: Your Eminence
- Religious style: Cardinal
- Informal style: Cardinal
- See: Utrecht

Adrianus Johannes Simonis (26 November 1931 – 2 September 2020) was a Dutch cardinal of the Catholic Church. He served as Archbishop of Utrecht from 1983 to 2007, and was made a cardinal in 1985.

== Biography ==
Simonis was born in Lisse, South Holland, the second eldest of eleven children. He studied at the Seminary of Hageveld from 1945 to 1951, and at the Major Seminary, Warmond, from 1951 to 1957. He was ordained to the priesthood by Bishop Martien Jansen on 15 June 1957, and then did pastoral work in the Diocese of Rotterdam until 1959, serving as curate at the parish of Saint Victor in Waddinxveen and later at the parish Holy Martyrs Gorinchem in Rotterdam.

From 1959 to 1966, he furthered his studies in Rome at the Pontifical University of St. Thomas Aquinas (Angelicum) and the Pontifical Biblical Institute, from where he obtained a doctorate cum laude in biblical exegesis with a thesis entitled: "Jesus as the Good Shepherd in the Gospel of Saint John". Following his return to the Netherlands, he served as pastor of the parish of Blessed Sacrament in The Hague (1966–1970) and chaplain in the Red Cross Hospital. He became a canon of the cathedral chapter of Rotterdam in March 1969.

He was associated with the conservative side of the Dutch church, which was very divided in the years following the Second Vatican Council. He later disputed the label, telling an interviewer: "They say 'conservative', but I say with Saint Paul: 'Test all things; hold fast what is good'. In that sense I am conservative." Pope Paul VI named him Bishop of Rotterdam on 29 December 1970, at the age of 39.

Pope John Paul II appointed Simonis Archbishop Coadjutor of Utrecht on 27 June 1983 and he succeeded as archbishop there upon the resignation of Cardinal Johannes Willebrands on 3 December 1983. On 6 December he was made a member of the Congregation for the Evangelization of Peoples.

A former president of the Dutch Bishops' Conference, Simonis was a major supporter of Pope John Paul's visit to the Netherlands in 1985.

He was elevated to the College of Cardinals during the consistory of 25 May 1985, as Cardinal-Priest of the Basilica of San Clemente, making him the seventh cardinal of the Dutch Church. He was a member of the Congregation for Institutes of Consecrated Life and Societies of Apostolic Life, and of the Congregation for Catholic Education and the Pontifical Council for Promoting Christian Unity. He held these memberships until his 80th birthday on 26 November 2011.

Simonis was one of the cardinal electors who participated in the 2005 papal conclave that elected Pope Benedict XVI.

Simonis sent his letter of resignation as Archbishop of Utrecht to Pope Benedict on 13 November 2006, and the Pope accepted it on 14 April 2007, two months before Simonis celebrated his golden jubilee as a priest on 15 June. Simonis continued to govern the archdiocese as Apostolic Administrator until his successor, Wim Eijk, who was appointed on 11 December of the same year, took possession of the see on 28 January 2008.

Simonis died on 2 September 2020 at a care centre in Voorhout.

== Controversy ==
In 2011, Simonis testified on 25 January that he had no role in the appointment or dismissal of a Catholic priest accused of drugging and raping a young man. The brief appearance by Simonis at Middelburg District Court marked the first time such a senior cleric had appeared in a Dutch courtroom to answer questions about abuse in the church. The victim, Dave ten Hoor, says he was drugged and raped twice by the priest, identified only as Father Jan N., in 1989 and 1990 in the southern town of Terneuzen. "I do not know him at all," Simonis said of Father Jan, adding that he had nothing to do with his appointment as a priest in Terneuzen. Simonis was drawn into the case because before moving to Terneuzen, Father Jan also allegedly abused children at a youth centre run by the Salesian order in Rijswijk, a town just outside The Hague. At the time, Simonis was Bishop of Rotterdam and Rijswijk fell within his diocese. However Simonis said he had visited the centre just once for a party and did not recall meeting the priest, though he did not rule out that he may have been introduced to him.

According to Radio Netherlands World:

The cardinal was told by the then bishop of Rotterdam, Philippe Bär, that the priest had sexually abused underage boys in his parish in Zoetermeer. Bishop Bär wanted the priest out of his diocese. Archbishop Simonis then arranged for the man to be moved to a parish in Amersfoort.

The cardinal kept the Amersfoort parish in the dark about the priest's paedophile behaviour and convictions. The priest himself says the cardinal did nothing to monitor how the situation developed.

Parents who complained about the priest to Simonis were given no assistance. Hanneke Brunt, whose altar-boy son was abused: "Simonis told me – 'This doesn’t go on in the Roman Catholic Church. We don’t do that.'" Abuse victim Erwin Meester says Simonis "wilfully and knowingly gave a paedophile his protection, when he should have been protecting the faithful under his care".

Simonis said he dealt with all the cases of abuse that were brought to his attention "extremely carefully".

Catholic Church titles
Preceded by Martien Antoon Jansen	Bishop of Rotterdam; 29 December 1970–27 June 1983	Succeeded by Ronald Philippe Bär
Preceded by Johannes Willebrands	Archbishop of Utrecht; 3 December 1983–14 April 2007	Succeeded by Wim Eijk
Preceded by Lawrence Shehan	Cardinal-Priest of San Clemente; 25 May 1985–2 September 2020	Succeeded by Arrigo Miglio
