= Everard de Jong =

Catholic bishop

His Excellency Everardus Johannes de Jong
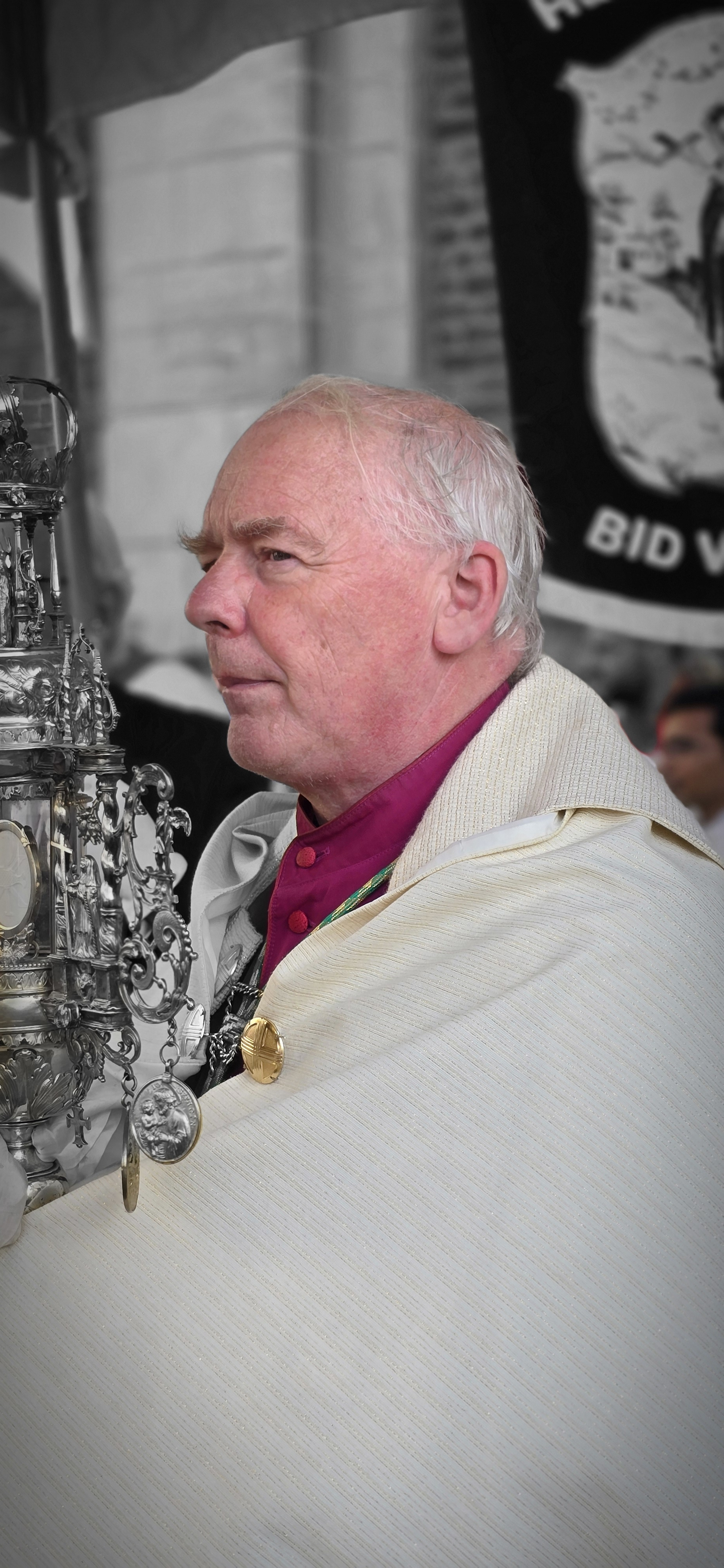
- Everard de Jong
- Native name: Everard

Orders
- Ordination: May 28, 1983 by Joannes Gijsen
- Consecration: February 6, 1999 by Frans Wiertz

Personal details
- Born: Everardus Johannes de Jong; July 4, 1958 (age 67) Eindhoven, Netherlands
- Denomination: Roman Catholic
- Motto: Ut vitam abundantius habeant
- Coat of arms

Everardus Johannes (Everard) de Jong (July 4, 1958) is a Dutch prelate of the Roman Catholic Church. He is auxiliary bishop of Roermond since 1999.

== Early life and education ==
Born in Eindhoven de Jong is the oldest of six children. From 1970 until 1973 he studied at the lower technical school (LTS) at the Piuslane, specialising in metalwork, and from 1973 until 1976 he studied at the catholic middle technical school (MTS) at the Egelstraat in Eindhoven, specialising in electronics. In 1976 he went to the seminary Rolduc, the school for priests of the diocese of Roermond. He was ordained a Deacon on September 18, 1982 and was appointed to the parish of Saint Gertrudis in Maasbracht. He was ordained a priest on May 28, 1983, and worked as a chaplain for another year. In 1984 bishop Joannes Gijsen send him to Rome to study philosophy at the Pontifical University of Saint Thomas Aquinas, Angelicum, where he received his licentiate in 1986. He then went to The Catholic University of America in Washington DC, where he studied with Prof. William Wallace, and in 1989, was promoted to doctor in philosophy on the thesis Galileo Galilei's Logical treatises and Giacomo Zabarella's Opera logica. A Comparison.

== Church career ==
After his return to the Netherlands, De Jong taught philosophy at the seminary Rolduc and became responsible for youth, calling and evangelisation within the diocese. In 1994, bishop Wiertz made him chaplain of the Basilica of Saint Servatius in Maastricht, retaining his other functions. In 1995, he became priest for the students of Maastricht, and on December 11, 1998, he was made vicar-general of the diocese of Roermond. The next day, Pope John Paul II appointed him as auxiliary bishop of Roermond and titular bishop of Cariana. He was consecrated as bishop on 6 February 1999, from Franciscus Jozef Maria Wiertz, the Bishop of Roermond. On April 4, 1999, he became a canon of the chapter of the cathedral of Roermond.

On June 1, 2020, Pope Francis gave him additional appointment as apostolic administrator of the Military Ordinariate of Netherlands, while continuing to serve as auxiliary bishop of Roermond.
