= Diocese of Roermond =

Catholic diocese in the Netherlands

Diocese of Roermond Dioecesis Ruremundensis Bisdom Roermond

Catholic
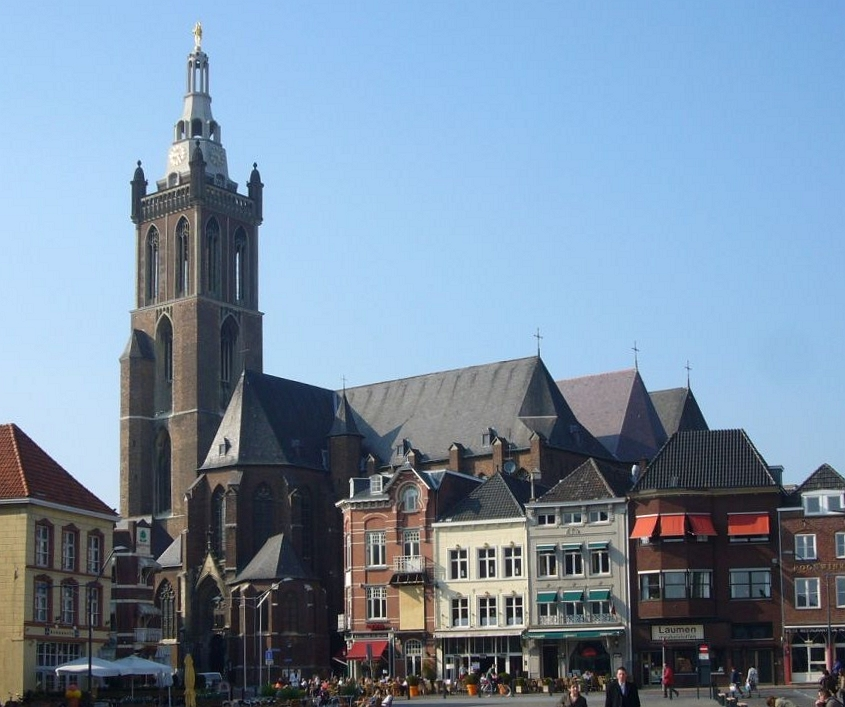
- Saint Christopher Cathedral

- Coat of arms

Location
- Country: Netherlands
- Territory: Limburg
- Metropolitan: Archdiocese of Utrecht

Statistics
- Area: 2,209 km^{2} (853 sq mi)
- Population: Total; Catholics: (as of 2020); 1,131,930; 1,086,540 (96%)

Information
- Denomination: Catholic
- Sui iuris church: Latin Church
- Rite: Roman Rite
- Established: 12 May 1559 (re-established 4 March 1853)
- Cathedral: Cathedral of Saint Christopher in Roermond

Current leadership
- Pope: Leo XIV
- Bishop: Ron van den Hout
- Metropolitan Archbishop: Wim Eijk
- Auxiliary Bishops: Everard de Jong
- Bishops emeritus: Frans Wiertz

Map
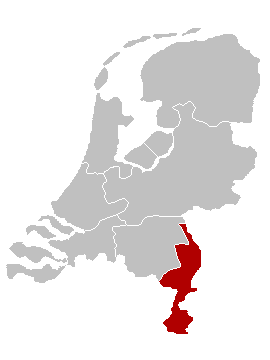
- Location of the Diocese of Roermond

Website
- bisdom-roermond.nl

The Diocese of Roermond (Latin: Dioecesis Ruremundensis) is a diocese of the Latin Church of the Catholic Church, located in the Netherlands. The diocese is one of the seven suffragan dioceses in the ecclesiastical province of the Metropolitan Archbishop of Utrecht. The territory of the diocese covers the Province of Limburg.

Its cathedral episcopal see is the Cathedral of St. Christopher in Roermond.

Its main pilgrimage sites are Kapel in 't Zand and Valkenburg.

The Dean of Roermond is responsible for the parishes in that city and a few other municipalities in the diocese.

== History ==
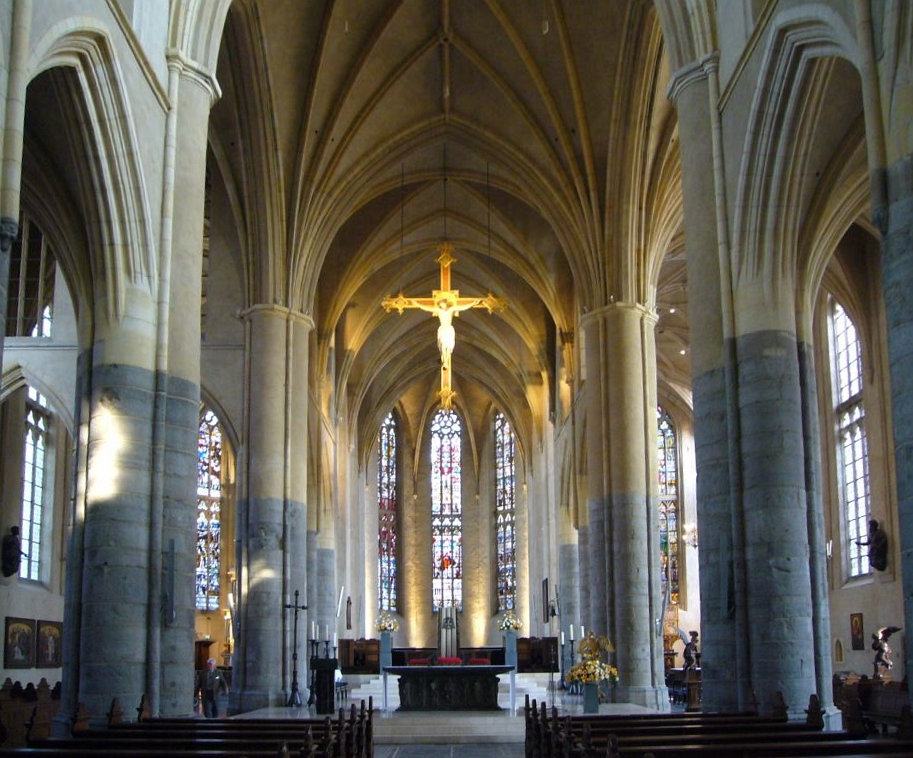
Roermond's St. Christopher cathedral

Originally established on 12 May 1559, on territories split off from the Metropolitan Archdiocese of Cologne (Keulen, now in Germany) and Diocese of Liège (Luik, now in Belgium).

During the Napoleonic era, on 15 July 1801 it lost territory to establish the Apostolic Vicariate of Grave–Nijmegen. On 29 November 1801 the diocese was suppressed, its territory being divided between the above vicariate and the establishment of the (German) Diocese of Aachen (Aix-la-Chapelle).

It was re-established in 1840 by the Holy See as (pre-diocesan) Apostolic Vicariate of Limburg. In 1853 it was promoted as Diocese of Roermond and gained territory from the Belgian Diocese of Liège.

During the 1960s, the relatively strong demarcation between the Netherlands' Catholic south and its Calvinist northwest began to diminish. Since the second half of the twentieth century, a rapid secularization and strong loss of religious affiliation have taken place in Limburg.

== Statistics and population ==
The diocese has roughly 817,000 registered Catholics (about 72.3% of the population of Limburg). Roughly 3 percent of the population in the Diocese Roermond attends Mass on Sundays (as per official Church (KASKI) data). The Roermond diocese is one of the two in the Netherlands that is in a majority-Catholic region, as per the most recent KASKI data.

As per 2014, it pastorally served 1,091,000 Catholics (96.0% of 1,136,000 total) on 2,209 km² in 303 parishes with 471 priests (219 diocesan, 252 religious), 71 deacons, 1,210 lay religious (440 brothers, 770 sisters) and 24 seminarians.

Limburg is mostly Catholic by tradition and still uses the term and certain traditions as a base for its cultural identity, though the vast majority of the population is now largely irreligious in practice. According to research among Dutch Catholics in 2006, 27% of the Dutch Catholics can be regarded as theist, 55% as ietsist/agnostic theist and 17% agnostic.

== Episcopal Ordinaries ==
Suffragan Bishops

- Willem Damasus Van der Lindt (1562–1588)
- Hendrik van Cuyk (1596–1609)
- Jacobus a Castro (1611–1639)
- Andreas Creusen (1651–1657)
- Eugène, Count d'Allamont (1659–1666)
- Lancelot de Gottignies (1670–1673)
- Reginald Cools, O.P. (1677–1700)
- Ange d'Ongnies, O.F.M. Cap. (1701–1722)
- François-Louis Sanguessa, O.F.M. (1722–1741)
- Jan-Baptist de Castillion (1742–1743)
- Joseph Anselme François Werbrouck (1743–1746)
- Jean-Antoine de Robiano (1746–1769)
- Jan Hendrik van Kerens, S.J. (1770–1775)
- Philippus, Empire Count van en tot Hoensbroeck (1775–1793)
- Jan, Baron van Velde tot Melroy en Sart-Bomal (1794–1801)

Apostolic Vicar of Limburg

- Joannes Augustus Paredis (1840.12.18 – 1853.03.04 see below), Titular Bishop of Hirina (1840.12.18 – 1853.03.04)

Suffragan Bishops

- Jan Augustus Paredis (see above 1853.03.04 – death 1886.06.18)
- Frans Boermans (1886–1900)
- Jozesh Hubertus Drehmans (1900–1913)
- Lorenz Schrijnen (1914–1932)
- Jozef Hubertus Willem Lemmens (1932–1958)
- Jan Michiel Jozef Antoon Hanssen (1958-1958)
- Pieter Jan Antoon Moors (1959–1970)
- Jan Baptist Matthijs Gijsen (1972–1993)
  - Alphons Castermans, auxiliary (1982–1997)
- Frans Jozef Maria Wiertz (1993–2017)
  - Everard de Jong, auxiliary (1999–)
- Harrie Smeets (2018–2023)
- Ron van den Hout (2024–present)

== See also ==
- Catholic Church in the Netherlands
