= Catholic Church in the Netherlands =

- Dutch: Rooms-katholiek kerkgenootschap in Nederland
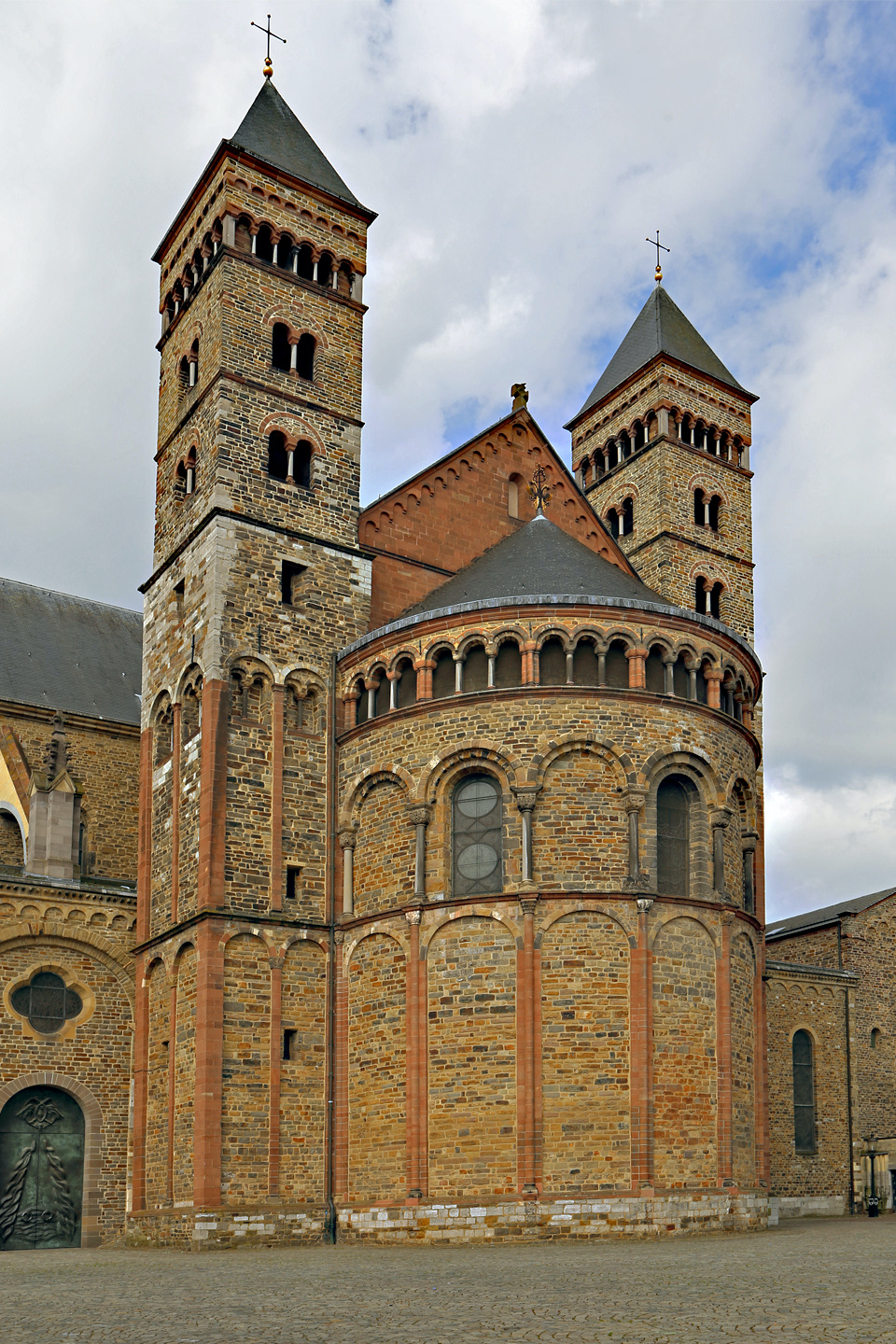
- Basilica of Saint Servatius, Maastricht
- Type: National polity
- Classification: Catholic
- Orientation: Latin
- Governance: Episcopal
- Pope: Leo XIV
- President: Bishop Hans van den Hende
- Primate: Cardinal Wim Eijk
- Apostolic Nuncio: Santiago de Wit Guzmán
- Region: Netherlands
- Language: Dutch, Latin
- Headquarters: St Catherine's Cathedral, Utrecht
- Separations: Mennonites (1540); Dutch Reformed Church (1571); Old Catholic Church (1724)
- Members: 4,332,020
- Official website: Episcopal Conference of the Netherlands

The Catholic Church in the Netherlands (Dutch: Rooms-katholiek kerkgenootschap in Nederland) is part of the worldwide Catholic Church under the spiritual leadership of the Pope in Rome. Its primate is the Metropolitan Archbishop of Utrecht, since 2008 Willem Jacobus Eijk. In 2015 Catholicism was the single largest religion of the Netherlands, forming some 23% of the Dutch people, based on in-depth interviewing, down from 40% in the 1960s. Adherents of Catholics are however heavily concentrated in southern regions of the country, with a relatively small presence in large parts of the country.

Although the number of Catholics in the Netherlands has decreased in recent decades, the Catholic Church remains today the largest religious group in the Netherlands. Once known as a Protestant country, Catholicism surpassed Protestantism after the First World War, and in 2012 the Netherlands was only 10% Dutch Protestant, down from 60% in the early 20th century, which is primarily due to rising lack of affiliation starting two decades earlier than in Dutch Catholicism. In 2021, there were an estimated 3.7 million in the Netherlands, 21.7% of the population, down from more than 40% in the 1970s. The Catholic Church in the Netherlands has suffered an official membership loss of 650,000 members between 2003 (4,532,000 pers. / 27.9% overall population) and 2015 (3,882,000 pers. / 22.9% overall population). The number of people registered as Catholic in the Netherlands continues to decrease, roughly by half a percent annually.

The south of the country has historically been the most Catholic parts of the Netherlands, specifically the provinces of North Brabant and Limburg along with the southern part of Gelderland. There is also a Catholic-strong exclave in the Twente region, in the east of the country. Catholicism and some of its traditions now form a cultural identity rather than a religious identity for some people in these areas. The majority of the Catholic population is now largely irreligious in practice, in line with the rest of the Dutch population. Research among self-identified Catholics in the Netherlands in 2007 showed that 27% could be regarded as theist; 55% as ietsist, deist, or agnostic; and 17% as atheist. In 2015, 13% of self-identified Dutch Catholics believed in the existence of heaven; 17% in a personal God; and fewer than half believe that Jesus was the Son of God or sent by God.

In December 2011, a report was published by Wim Deetman, a former Dutch Minister of Education, detailing child abuse within the Catholic Church in the Netherlands: 1,800 instances of abuse "by clergy or volunteers within Dutch Catholic dioceses" were reported to have occurred since 1945. Church attendance by Catholics has decreased in recent decades to 98,600 or 2.7% of Dutch Catholics in a regular weekend of May 2022.

== History ==
=== Medieval period ===
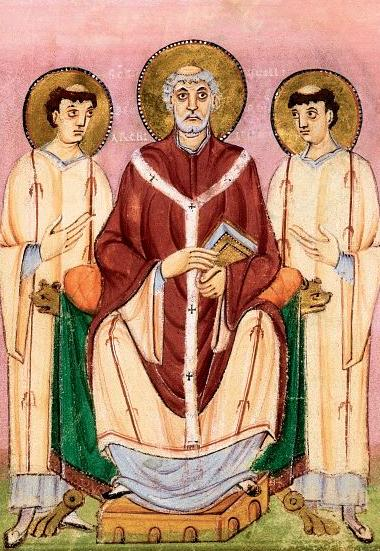
St. Willibrord, Apostle of the Frisians and part of the Anglo-Saxon mission. He was the first Bishop of Utrecht.

From the 4th to the 6th century AD The Great Migration took place, in which the small Celtic-Germanic-Roman tribes in the Low Countries were gradually supplanted by three major Germanic tribes: the Franks, the Frisians and Saxons.

The most powerful of these were the Franks (who, at the time, resided between the Rhine and the Somme) and they converted to Catholic Christianity, during the reign of King Clovis I around 500 AD. Most of the region thus fell under the Frankish Kingdom and then the Carolingian Empire until the end of the 9th century. From the center of the Diocese of Tongeren-Maastricht-Liège, successively the cities of Tongeren, Maastricht and Liège, this part of the Low Countries was probably Christianized. According to tradition, the first Bishop of Maastricht, Servatius, was buried in this city in 384, though only from Bishop Domitianus (ca. 535) is it established that he resided in Maastricht.

The coastal Frisian Kingdom remained Germanic pagan but were eventually conquered by Charles Martel and incorporated into the Catholic Frankish Kingdom after the Battle of the Boarn in 734. The Northern parts of the Netherlands were converted as part of the Anglo-Saxon mission as Catholic Christians from the various kingdoms of Anglo-Saxon England moved to the Continent, such as St. Willibrord, the Apostle of the Frisians and St. Boniface, who was martyred in Friesland. Both were active in the eighth century, having great impact on the conversion of the country. The areas in the Low Countries which would eventually become part of the modern Netherlands were part of Middle Francia and then Lotharingia, before eventually becoming part of the Holy Roman Empire of the German Nation as part of the Burgundian Netherlands. Originally under the House of Valois-Burgundy by the end of the 15th century it was part of the Habsburg Netherlands as part of a vast Catholic Habsburg Empire dominated by the Kingdom of Spain.

=== Since the rise of Calvinism ===
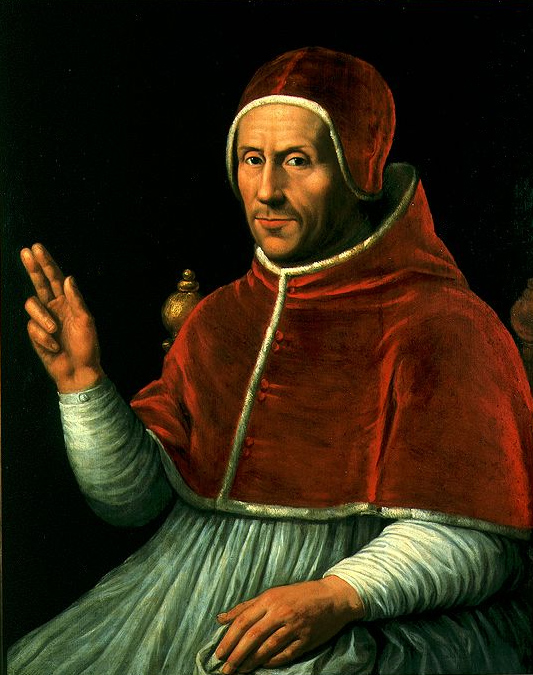
Pope Adrian VI, to date the only Dutchman to reign as Pope. He held the Papacy from 9 January 1522 until his death on 14 September 1523.

Since the War of Independence the Catholics were systematically and officially discriminated against by the Protestant government until the second half of the 20th century, which had a major influence on the economical and cultural development of the southern part of the Netherlands. Dutch Catholics were "reduced to the rank of second-class citizens" and were barred from all civil service positions; Catholics were not only barred from administrative posts such as that of a mayor, but they were also banned from minor ones such as lantern lighter and turf carrier. The church itself also faced harassment, and between 1703 and 1727 the papal nuncio was not allowed to enter the territory of the Netherlands. Increasingly marginalised, Dutch Catholics became one of the poorest groups in the Dutch society. According to Jan Roegiers, in many Catholic areas "not a single Catholic, aside from the pastor and his assistant, belonged to the intellectual and merchant class". The economic plight of Catholics was largely the result of discrimination by the Protestant majority.

From the Reformation to the 20th century, Dutch Catholics had largely been confined to certain southern areas in the Netherlands where they still tend to form a majority or large minority of the population. However, with modern population shifts and increasing secularization, these areas tend to be less and less predominantly Catholic. Registered Catholics still form a slight majority in the most southern province of the Netherlands, Limburg (refer to the overview by diocese above). After the Dutch Republic banned the Catholic religion in the 1580s the Netherlands became a mission territory under the canonical authority of the Congregation for the Propagation of the Faith (the so-called Dutch Mission). The episcopal hierarchy was not restored until 1853, with the reestablishment of the episcopal hierarchy in the Netherlands.

=== Restoration of Catholic hierarchy ===
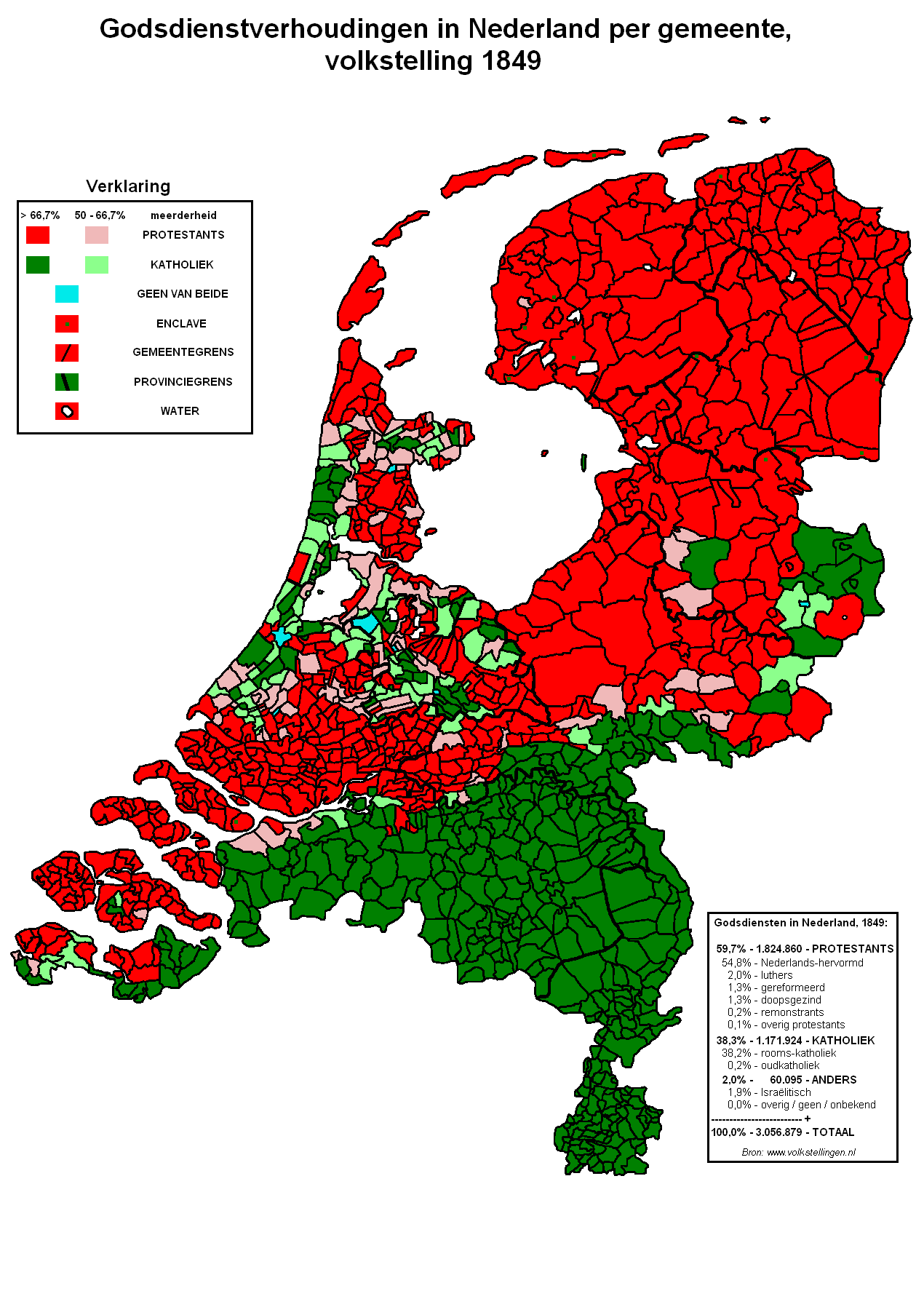
Religion in the Netherlands in 1849. Catholic-majority areas in green.

In the late nineteenth and early twentieth centuries Catholics formed a separate social pillar, with their own schools, TV and radio broadcasting, hospitals, unions, and political party. They formed a coalition with orthodox Protestants, who also felt discriminated against. This pillarization and coalition government was important in emancipating the Catholics from their social exclusion. In the period between 1860 and 1960, Catholic church life and institutions flourished. This period is called "The Rich Roman Life" (Dutch: Het Rijke Roomse leven). During this period, the number of Catholics in the Dutch population grew to approximate parity with Protestants, as in Northern Ireland, Scotland, Switzerland, and Germany.

=== Recent Era ===
At the Second Vatican Council, representatives of the Dutch Church were prominent on the liberal-wing: especially Cardinal Bernardus Johannes Alfrink, who had the Belgian periti Edward Schillebeeckx working under him and also Fr. Johannes Willebrands, who was involved in ecumenism and promoting religious liberty. While on the otherhand, Fr. Sebastiaan Tromp, a Dutchman who worked under Cardinal Alfredo Ottaviani, was involved in drawing up the original conservative schemas which were thrown out. Following the Council, Schillebeeckx and Piet Schoonenberg released the Dutch Catechism, which was one of the more radical representations of the "spirit of Vatican II" in Europe. The Bishops' Conference of the Netherlands under Johannes Bluyssen was engaged in a number of controversies with Rome around this time, also, relating to a wide variety of issues from morality, to doctrine, to the liturgy.

In the 1980s and 1990s the church became polarized. The conservatives' main organization was Contact Roman Catholics. The liberals' main organization was the Eighth of May Movement (Dutch: "Acht Mei-beweging"), founded because of disputes about the papal visit in 1985; the Movement had a difficult relationship with the bishops, and disbanded in 2003. In December 2011 a report was published by Wim Deetman, a former Dutch minister, detailing widespread child abuse within the Catholic Church in the Netherlands: 1,800 instances of abuse "by clergy or volunteers within Dutch Catholic dioceses" were reported to have occurred since 1945. According to the report "The risk of experiencing unwanted sexual advances was twice as great for minors in institutions as the national average of 9.7%. This finding reveals no significant difference between Catholic institutions and other institutions." In March 2012, however, it was revealed that left out were the cases of 10 children being surgically castrated after reporting being sexually abused to the police. It also emerged that in 1956 former prime minister Victor Marijnen, then chairman of a children's home in Gelderland, had covered up the sexual abuse of children. According to the Telegraph newspaper, he "intervened to have prison sentences dropped against several priests convicted of abusing children." The factuality of these claims is unclear, though. The Commission rejected all the claims.

A cultural divide is still found between the "Catholic" south and the "Protestant" north, but with a total of 1.5 million people and 20% of the industrial production in the Netherlands, the southern "Catholic" area BrabantStad has become one of the major economically important, metropolitan regions of the Netherlands.

Currently, Catholicism is still the single largest religion of the Netherlands with around four million registered members, 22.9% of the Dutch population in 2015. In 2006, in the Diocese of 's-Hertogenbosch (in the eastern part of North Brabant and in part of Gelderland), only 45,645 residents, mostly people over 65, attended Mass, only 2% of the total population in that area. In western North Brabant (the Diocese of Breda), the number of people associating themselves with Catholicism also strongly decreased. Church attendance is even lower in the west with only 1% of the West Brabantian population visiting churches in 2006. A planned visit of Pope Francis to the Netherlands was blocked by Cardinal Wim Eijk in 2014, allegedly because of the feared lack of interest for the Pope among the Dutch public.

92% of Dutch Catholics support same-sex marriage and 3% oppose it. 95% of Dutch Catholics believe society should accept homosexuality, while 4% believe society should not accept homosexuality.

== Dioceses ==
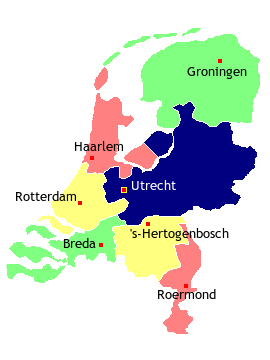
Overview of Dutch dioceses

There are seven dioceses in the Netherlands:

- Metropolitan Archdiocese of Utrecht, St Catherine's Cathedral, Archbishop Wim Eijk (since 2007)
  - Diocese of Breda, St. Anthony of Padua Cathedral, Bishop Johannes Liesen (since 2011)
  - Diocese of Groningen-Leeuwarden, St. Joseph Cathedral, Bishop Ronald Cornelissen (since 2025)
  - Diocese of Haarlem-Amsterdam, Cathedral of St Bavo, Bishop Jan Hendriks (since 2020)
  - Diocese of Roermond, St. Christopher's Cathedral, Bishop Ron van den Hout (since 2024)
  - Diocese of Rotterdam, St. Lawrence and St. Elizabeth Cathedral, Bishop Hans van den Hende (since 2011)
  - Diocese of 's-Hertogenbosch (Den Bosch), St. John's Cathedral, Bishop Gerard de Korte (since 2016)

There is also the Military Ordinariate of the Netherlands for the Dutch military and the Ukrainian Catholic Eparchy of Saint Vladimir the Great of Paris is for the Ukrainian Greek Catholic population of the Netherlands.

Former dioceses of the Netherlands included: Diocese of Deventer, Diocese of Leeuwarden, Diocese of Maastricht, Diocese of Middelburg, Apostolic Vicariate of Batavia, Apostolic Vicariate of Grave-Nijmegen, Apostolic Vicariate of Limburg, and the Apostolic Vicariate of Ravenstein-Megen.

== Demographics ==
| year | population | Catholics (based on registration by the church itself) | Percentage (based on registration by the church itself) |
|---|---|---|---|
| 1970 | 12,957,621 | 5,320,000 | 40.5 |
| 1980 | 14,091,014 | 5,620,000 | 39.5 |
| 1990 | 14,892,574 | 5,560,000 | 37.0 |
| 2000 | 15,863,950 | 5,060,413 | 31.6 |
| 2010 | 16,574,989 | 4,166,000 | 25.0 |
| 2020 | 17,407,585 | 3,701,000 | 21.2 |
| 2022 | 17,590,672 | 4,332,020 | 24.6 |

These figures are the latest available as of 2020 from ecclesiastical statistics:

Number of registered people per diocese and church attendance
| Diocese | Registered as Catholic in the population (2020–2021) | | Sunday Catholic church attendance in the general population (at least once a month) (2010) | |
| Diocese | (registered by church as member) | (percentage) | (people attending church) | (percentage) |
|---|---|---|---|---|
| Groningen-Leeuwarden | 101,330 (2021) | 5.6% | 6,900 | 0.4% |
| Utrecht | 762,100 (2020) | 18.5% | 31,700 | 0.8% |
| Haarlem-Amsterdam | 455,320 (2021) | 14.6% | 24,300 | 0.8% |
| Rotterdam | 476,000 (2020) | 12.5% | 25,800 | 0.7% |
| Breda | 418,000 (2020) | 36.4% | 12,300 | 1.1% |
| 's-Hertogenbosch | 1,045,470 (2020) | 48.5% | 38,900 | 1.9% |
| Roermond | 1,086,540 (2021) | 96.0% | 32,800 | 2.9% |
| Netherlands in total | 4,344,730 (2020–2021) | 35.23% | 172,700 | 1.0% |

According to the church administration, in 2010 two dioceses – 's-Hertogenbosch and Roermond – still had a majority of Catholics in the population. It is notable that SILA (Stichting Interkerkelijke Ledenadministratie) published for these two dioceses a lower number of Catholics in 2005. Based on the SILA-numbers, in the diocese of Hertogenbosch in 2010 the population has no longer a Catholic majority. KASKI (Katholiek Sociaal-Kerkelijk Insituut / Catholic Social-Ecclesiastical Institute) found 23.3% of the population to be nominal Catholic in 2014, based on registration by the Catholic church. These numbers are higher than the numbers of Catholic adherence found by Radboud University and Vrije Universiteit Amsterdam (11.7% Catholic in 2015). These surveys show a disconnect between membership and actual adherence. Especially the Catholic Church often claims that a quarter of the Dutch population is Catholic, pointing to the official statistics, but when questioned, fewer than half that number associate themselves with the Catholic faith. Many people still registered as members of a church are no longer religious or practicing, but for various reasons have not officially renounced their membership, a phenomenon known as 'belonging without believing'.

Estimated number of Catholic sacraments and ecclesiastical rituals in the Netherlands (2003–2019)
| Year | Infant baptisms | Communions | Confirmations | Conversions | Weddings | Funerals |
|---|---|---|---|---|---|---|
| 2003 | 37,065 | 40,435 | 29,385 | 805 | 7,700 | 38,130 |
| 2005 | 33,000 | 37,905 | 27,175 | 735 | 6,600 | 34,285 |
| 2010 | 23,840 | 32,410 | 21,220 | 760 | 3,865 | 28,630 |
| 2015 | 14,030 | 19,870 | 12,660 | 540 | 1,910 | 21,880 |
| 2020 | 5,170 | 6,040 | 3,810 | 275 | 395 | 16,720 |

According to the Church's figures, Catholics became a minority in the Diocese of 's-Hertogenbosch in 2014. The number of parishes in the Netherlands has dropped between 2003 and 2014 from 1525 to 760.

Churches and Parishes in the Netherlands
| Year | Number of Churches | Number of Parishes |
|---|---|---|
| 2003 | 1782 | 1525 |
| 2005 | 1740 | 1442 |
| 2010 | 1629 | 1139 |
| 2015 | 1513 | 726 |
| 2020 | 1333 | 647 |

Many remaining churches have found purposes outside the religious domain, like stores, apartment buildings and museums.

Catholic membership according to the Catholic Church registration
Catholic adherence according to indepth interviewing

== Churches ==
As well as the cathedrals, notable Catholic churches in the Netherlands also include:

- Basilica of Saint Nicholas, Amsterdam
- Begijnhof Chapel, Amsterdam
- Church of Our Lady, Amsterdam
- Church of St. Peter and St. Paul, Amsterdam
- De Krijtberg, Amsterdam
- Mozes en Aäronkerk, Amsterdam
- James the Greater Church, Bocholtz
- St Francis Xavier Church, Enkhuizen
- St Willibrordus, Hulst
- St Joseph's Church, Leiden
- Heilige Lodewijkkerk, Leiden
- Basilica of Our Lady, Maastricht
- Basilica of Saint Servatius, Maastricht
- St Peter Canisius Church, Nijmegen
- Basilica of St Plechelm, Oldenzaal
- Oudenbosch Basilica
- Church of St John the Baptist, Pijnacker
- St Lambert's Church, Rosmalen
- Saint Remigius Church, Simpelveld
- Basilica of St Amelberga, Susteren
- Gerardus Majellakerk, Tilburg
- Boomkerk, Amsterdam
- Heuvelse kerk, Tilburg
- Saint Bernard Church, Ubachsberg
- Saint Paul's Church, Vaals
- Our Lady of the Enclosed Garden, Warfhuizen

Monasteries also include:

- Egmond Abbey
- St. Benedictusberg Abbey
- St. Willibrord's Abbey
- Carmelite Monastery, Echt
- Berne Abbey
- Achel Abbey
- Koningshoeven Abbey
- Lilbosch Abbey

== Notable Dutch Catholics ==
Notable Dutch Catholics throughout history include Pope Adrian VI, Ruud Lubbers, Henry of Gorkum, Hadewijch, Cornelius Loos, Jan Peter Balkenende, Jakob Middendorp, Hieronymus Bosch, Piet de Jong, queen Maxima of The Netherlands, Jan Harmenszoon Krul, Dries van Agt, Jan Steen, Casimir Ubaghs, Maxime Verhagen, Erasmus, and Joan Albert Ban.

== See also ==
- Catholic Church in the Dutch Caribbean
- Protestantism in the Netherlands
- Religion in the Netherlands
