= Gregoriana Amsterdam =

Gregoriana Amsterdam is a vocal ensemble specialized in the reconstruction and performance of Gregorian chant based on tenth-century sources. Gregoriana was initiated by Reinier van der Lof in 2002. Since its foundation Gregoriana has been directed by Geert Maessen. Since 2006 Gregoriana also has a female branch, initially called Virga. Gregoriana’s home is the Church of St. Peter and St. Paul, Amsterdam, where every first and third Saturday of the month at 16:00 Vespers are sung and every first Sunday at 10:30 Holy Mass. Until September 2019 Gregoriana's home has been the Amsterdam Obrechtkerk.

== Notation and repertoire ==
Gregoriana preferably sings from the so-called Fluxus notation, a musical notation in which the oldest, tenth-century notation is placed on lines. Unlike more common notations, in the Fluxus notation all nuances (rhythmic, stylistic and ornamental) remain readable in an obvious way.

Gregoriana is particularly fascinated by those parts of the repertory which are rarely performed, but may nevertheless be regarded constitutive for the repertoire: the great responsories of the Night Office and the offertories with verses. Over 2,000 medieval responsories are preserved. In these chants the Gregorian composition techniques are reflected in an exemplary manner. In the verses of more than 100 tenth-century offertories, the most virtuoso parts of Gregorian chant can be found, which among other things is reflected in the longest melismas, the largest ambitus and most text repetitions.

Gregoriana has also paid special attention to the contemporaneous repertoires that were mostly eliminated by the standardization of Gregorian chant. Some of these repertoires, however, may be much older and at the base of Gregorian chant. Notably: Old Roman, Ambrosian (Milanese), (Old) Beneventan, Gallican and Mozarabic chant.

In particular, Mozarabic chant is high on Gregoriana’s priority list. This tradition existed from the sixth to the eleventh century on the Iberian Peninsula and southern France, but was officially abolished and replaced by Gregorian chant in 1085. Over 5000 chants of this tradition have been preserved in pitch-unreadable musical notation only. Gregoriana has performed dozens of computer aided reconstructions of Mozarabic chant.

== Cooperation, publications and radio ==
Gregoriana has worked with imams, chazans and other representatives of several religions, as well as musicians from several musical traditions; classical, improvised and folkloristic. Gregoriana has released eight CDs, including two in collaboration with the Egidius Kwartet. Additionally Gregoriana has published several books, including three about the lost chant of the Mozarabic rite.

From 2010 to 2016 Gregoriana's director has compiled radio broadcasts on Gregorian chant for the Dutch Concertzender. Many of these programs were about closely related traditions to Gregorian chant. All episodes can be streamed on the internet.

== See also ==
- Medieval music
- Byzantine music
- Mozarabic Rite

== References & bibliography ==
- Ismael Fernández de la Cuesta, Rosario Álvarez Martínez and Ana Llorens Martín eds., El canto mozárabe y su entorno, Estudios sobre la música de la liturgia viejo hispánica. Sociedad Española de Musicología, Madrid 2013.
- Roman Hankeln ed., The Offertory and its Verses: Research, Past, Present and Future. Tapir Academic Press, Trondheim 2007.
- Katherine E. Helsen, The Great Responsories of the Divine Office, Aspects of Structure and Transmission. Regensburg 2008.
- David Hiley, Western Plainchant, A Handbook. Clarendon Press, Oxford 1993.
- Geert Maessen, Scores for Tenth-Century Chant. Gregoriana Amsterdam 2011.
- Geert Maessen ed. Calculemus et Cantemus, Towards a Reconstruction of Mozarabic Chant. Gregoriana Amsterdam 2015.
- Rebecca Maloy, Inside the Offertory, Aspects of Chronology and Transmission. Oxford University Press 2010.
- James McKinnon, The Advent Project, The Later-Seventh-Century Creation of the Roman Mass Proper. University of California Press 2000.
- Don Michael Randel, An Index to the Chant of the Mozarabic Rite. Princeton University Press 1973.
- Casiano Rojo and Germán Prado, El canto mozárabe, Estudio histórico-crítico de su antigüedad y estado actual. Diputación Provincial de Barcelona 1929.
- Rachel Susanna Vroom-Barnard, 'Getijdendag in de Grote of St.-Bavokerk te Haarlem (4 juli 2009)', Tijdschrift voor Gregoriaans 34 (2009) 110-114.
- Bruno Zeegers and Chris Hakkennes, 'Fluxus, een alternatieve notatie?', Tijdschrift voor Gregoriaans 23 (1998) 36-42.
- Marcel Zijlstra, 'CD recensie: Gregoriana Live 2003', Tijdschrift voor Gregoriaans 29 (2004) 42-43.
