= St Peter Canisius Church, Nijmegen =

Church building in Nijmegen, Netherlands

Coordinates: 51.844836°N 5.863190°E

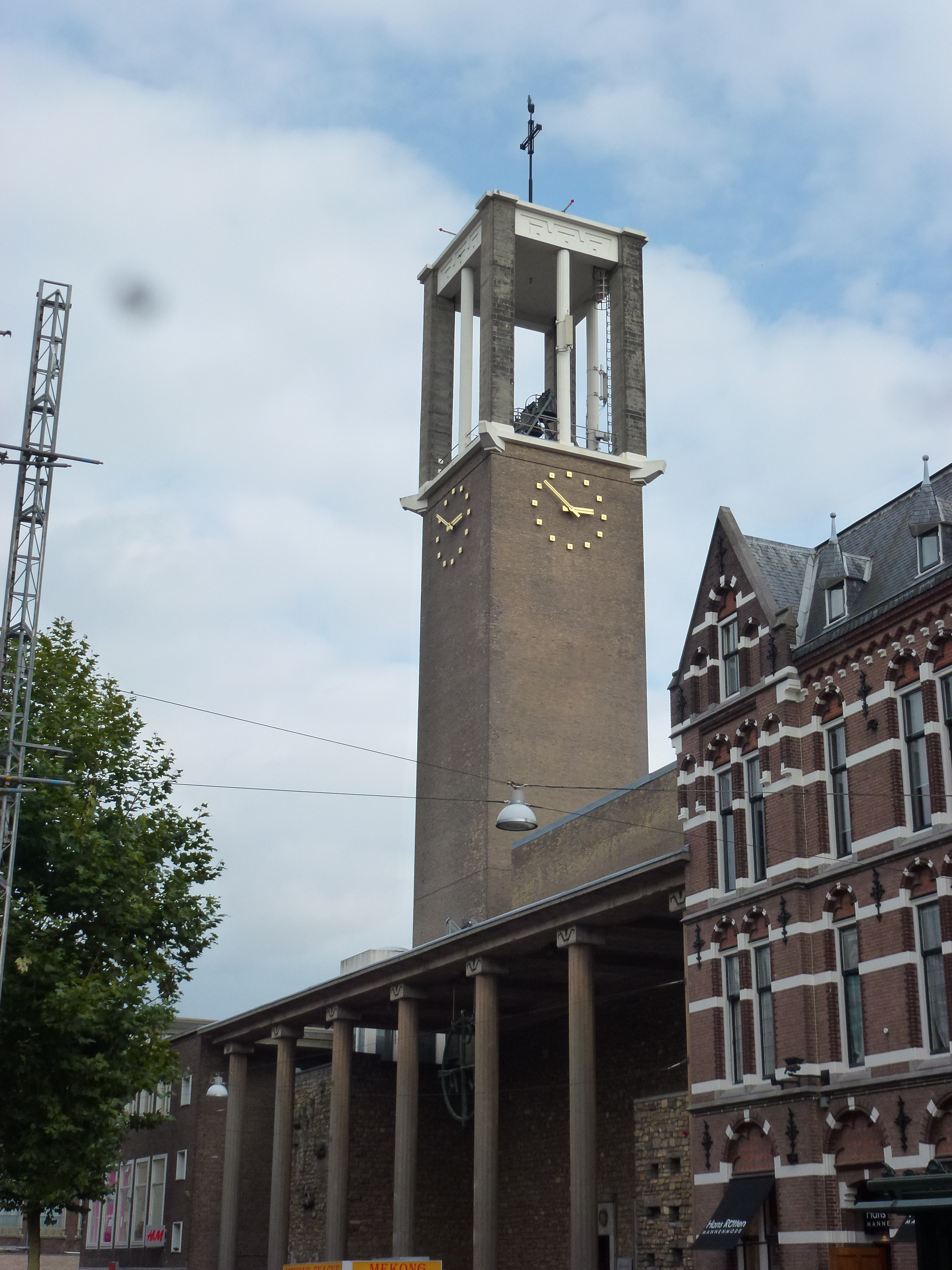
Entrance on Molenstraat

St Peter Canisius Church (Dutch: Sint-Petrus Canisiuskerk), also known as Molenstraatkerk, is a Roman Catholic Parish church in Nijmegen, Gelderland, Netherlands. It is situated on Molenstraat in the centre of the city. It is run by the Society of Jesus and is in the Diocese of 's-Hertogenbosch. It is built on the site of a 14th-century monastery, which was passed into the hands of the Jesuits in 1818. It was rebuilt in 1896 and again in 1960 after being bombed in the Second World War.

== History ==
This church is on the site of a 14th-century monastery. After the Eighty Years' War and the subsequent devastation and depopulation, the location was used as a Walloon church and then a Lutheran church. In 1818, the church was again used a Catholic place of worship, being given to the Jesuits.

From 1821 to 1925, it was dedicated to St. Ignatius of Loyola, the founder of the Jesuits. However, because the church was too small for the expanding Catholic population, a larger church had to be built. From 1894 to 1896, a new Gothic Revival church with presbytery was built by the architect Nicolaas Molenaar Sr., who also designed St Francis Xavier Church in Enkhuizen. The new church was consecrated in 1898. It received its present name in 1925, when it was dedicated to St. Peter Canisius, who was canonized that year.

During the Second World War, Nijmegen was bombarded and a large part of the church building was destroyed on 22 February 1944, only the chancel and transept remained. Between 1958 and 1960, a new church building by the architects J. Coumans, W. van Dael and A. Siebers was built and was connected to the old transept and choir.

It is one of two places run by the Jesuits in Nijmegen, the other being the Berchmanianum in the Brakkenstein district of Nijmegen.

== Architecture ==
The church consists of the old choir and transept connected to a new building. The roof of the church is supported by a concrete structure. Between the columns hangs a bronze monogram of Jesus, designed by Jan Vaes.

In the foot of the tall bell tower, which was built in the post-war restoration, on the left of the main entrance, there is a chapel where the statue of Our Lady of Nijmegen is kept. In 1836, this small black statue of Mary was kept in what was St. Ignatius church and was donated by Anthony of Veersen. Also in this chapel is a stone statue of Peter Canisius by Gerard Bruning. In a display, under the altar, are relics of Peter Canisius, including his shoes.

The organ of the church comes from the demolished Church of the Resurrection in Grootstal part of Nijmegen. The cross in the church was created by the artist from Nijmegen, Wim van Woerkom, who also designed some stained-glass windows in the church.

== Gallery ==
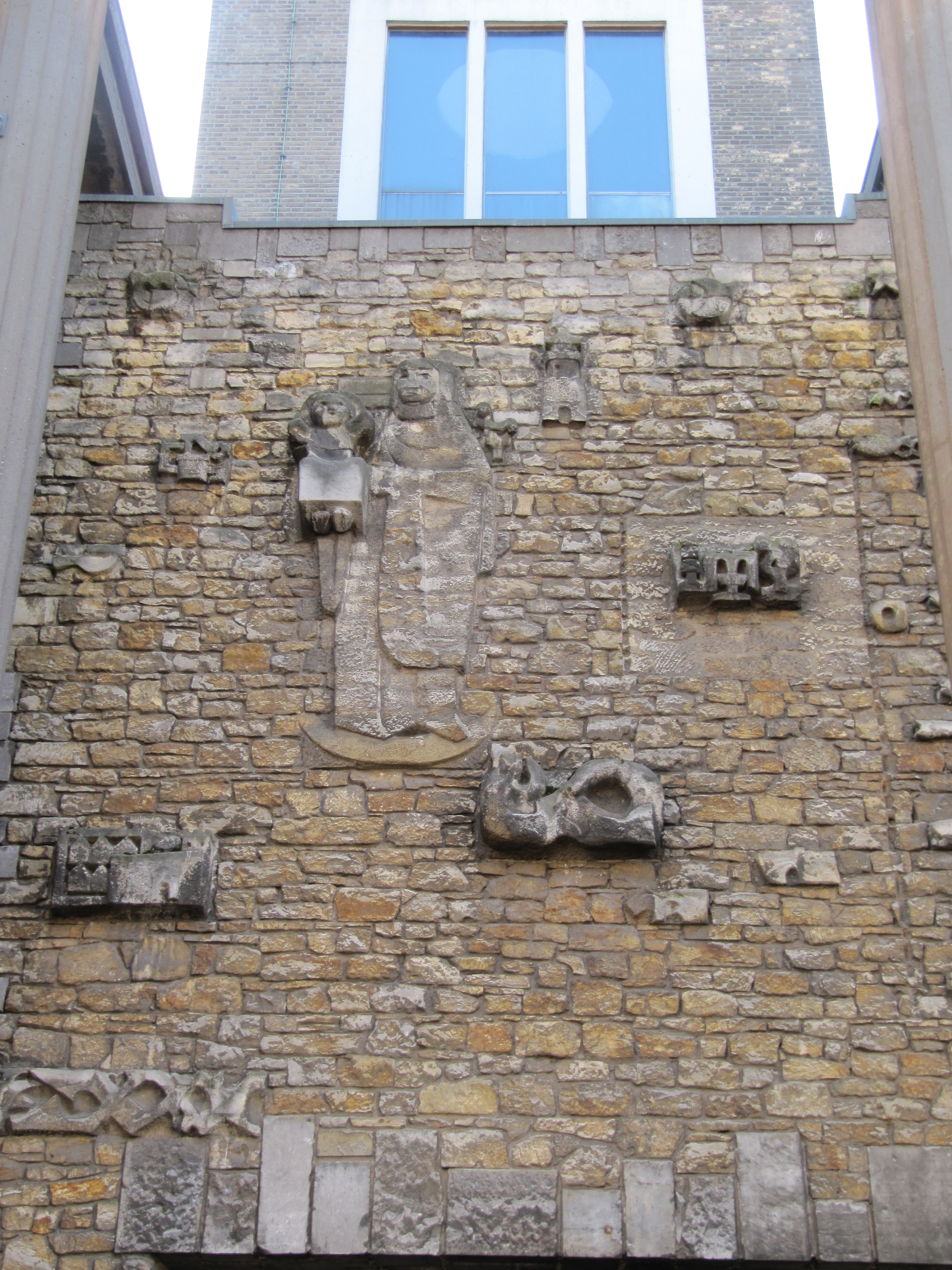
External reliefs

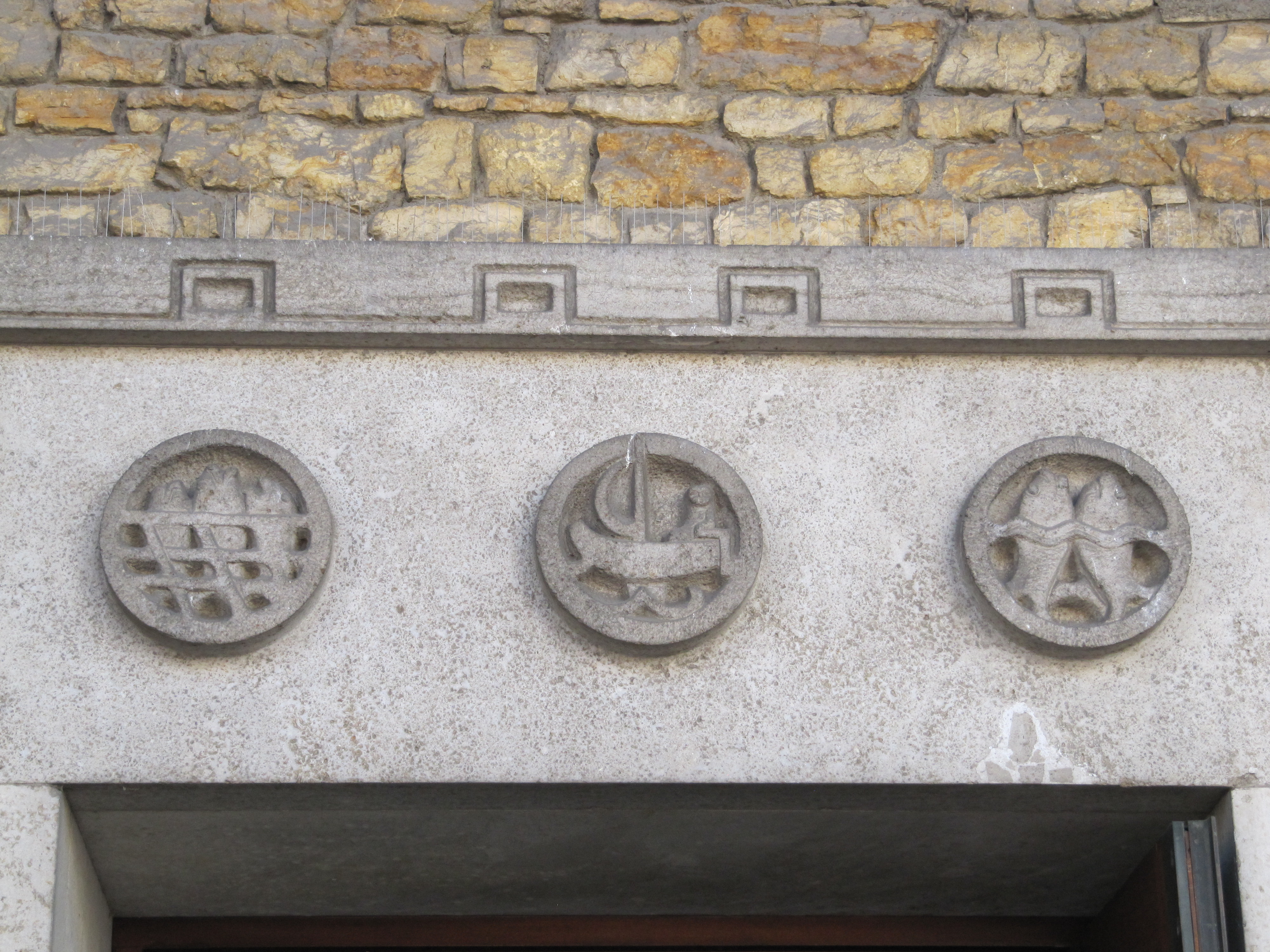
Reliefs above doorway

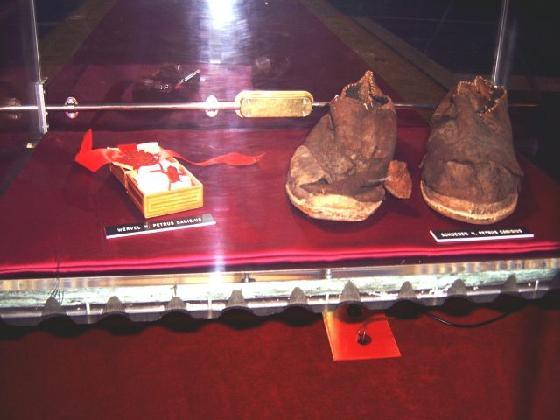
Relics of St. Peter Canisius

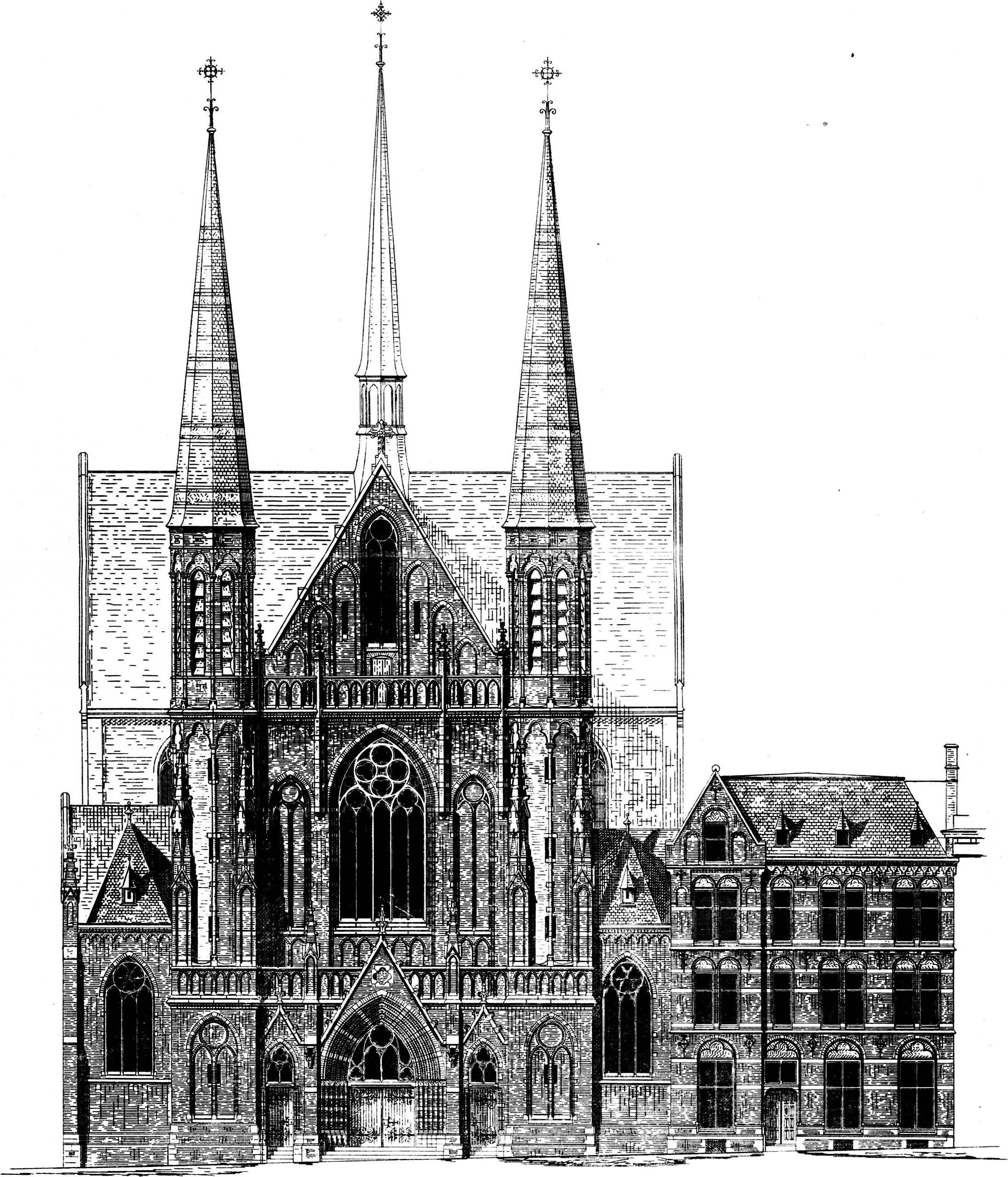
Plan of original church

== See also ==
- Berchmanianum
- List of Jesuit sites in the Netherlands
- List of Catholic churches in the Netherlands
