= Mauro Castagnaro =

Italian journalist, editor, author and political scientist

Mauro Castagnaro (born 1963 in Crema, Italy) is an Italian journalist, editor, author and political scientist specialising in economic, social, political and ecclesial affairs in Latin America. He is the author, with Ludovica Eugenio, of the first of the many books that would eventually appear dealing with the papacy of Pope Francis: Dissent Stifled: an agenda for Pope Francis (Italian: Il Dissenso Soffocato: un’agenda per Papa Francesco,) published by La Meridiana (2013). He is vice-president of the Italian section of the controversial We Are Church international movement, which campaigns for widespread reform in the Roman Catholic Church.

== Early life and work ==
Mauro Castagnaro was born in Crema in 1963. He graduated from the University of Milan with a degree in Political Science. He worked as an editor for Servizio Informazione America Latina (SIAL) (English: Latin American Information Service). A prolific writer on contemporary religious questions, he is currently editor of the Xaverian Brothers magazine Mission Today (Italian: Missione Oggi) and a contributor to several Italian periodicals such as Il Regno, Jesus, and Popoli. Mauro Castagnaro's work mainly focuses on socio-economic and political issues in Latin America, especially as these relate to the Roman Catholic Church, fringe Catholicism, Catholic dissent and Independent Catholicism. He has contributed to a range of publications for We Are Church including Eucharist Without Priests?

== Selected bibliography ==
- Mauro Castagnaro (interview with) in Maria Caterina Cifatte, Sensibilità Maschili: Punti di vista sul femminismo e sulla parzialità di genere, I Segni dei Gabrielli Editori, San Pietro in Caviano (Verona) 2008
- Mauro Castagnaro and Ludovica Eugenio, Il Dissenso Soffocato: un’agenda per Papa Francesco, La Meridiana, Molfetta (Bari), 2013
- Mauro Castagnaro (foreword) in Edward Jarvis, Carlos Duarte Costa: testament of a socialist bishop, Apocryphile Press, Berkeley (California), 2019
