= Eighth of May Movement =

Dutch Catholic organization

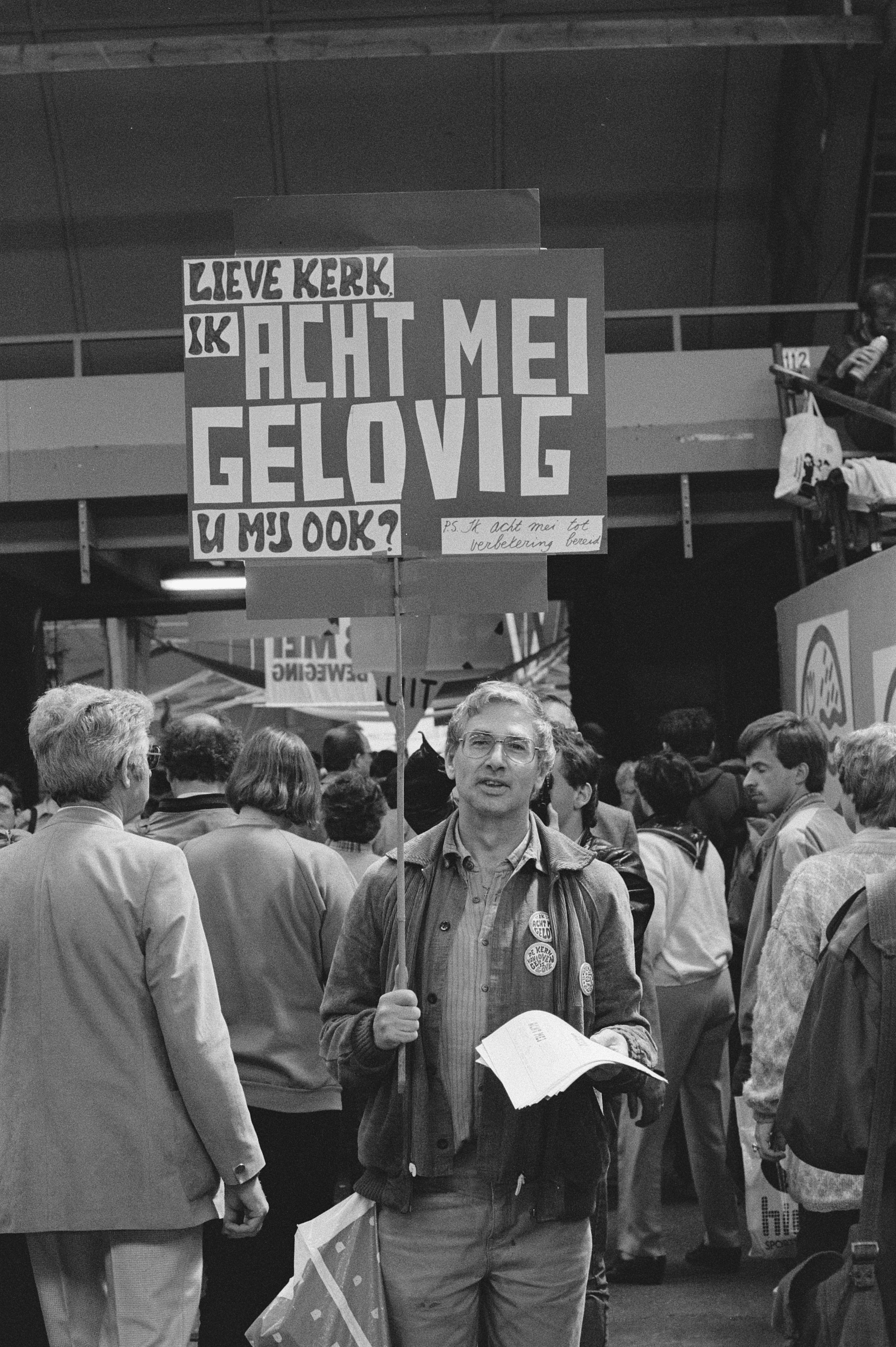
Protest against rigid church hierarchy in 's-Hertogenbosch on 8 May 1986

The Eight May movement (Dutch: Acht Meibeweging) was a Dutch umbrella organization within the Catholic Church in the Netherlands with the aim to reform it, founded in 1985. It was established because of dissatisfaction with the ruling conservative current in the Catholic Church in the Netherlands. The immediate reason was the visit of Pope John Paul II to the Netherlands in 1985 and concerns over potential suppression of some fringe Catholic leaders, such as feminist theologian Catharina Halkes.

The movement disbanded in 2003, because its former adherents had largely disengaged from the church and those who were left were much older.

== See also ==
- We are Church, a later somewhat similar movement that originated in German speaking countries.
