= Beneventan Rite =

Roman Catholic religious protocols

The Beneventan Rite was a Roman Catholic liturgical rite used in the "Beneventan" zone comprising continental Southern Italy and Dalmatia. It can be characterized by the usage of Benevenutan Chant and Beneventan Script, as well as the particular devotion to local Saints such as Saint Januarius.

Scholars have noted that the Beneventan Rite and Ambrosian Rite of present day Lombardy share many similarities, with Beneventan style chant even being known as "Cantus Ambrosianus" in the vernacular of the time. Subsequently, it has been proposed that a common ancestor proceeds both liturgical rites. This liturgical ancestor probably originated with the Lombards as they controlled both Milan and Benevento at one time.

== See also ==
- Beneventan Script
- Beneventan Chant
- Ambrosian Rite
- Lombards
- Liturgical Rite
