= Beneventan chant =

Beneventan chant is a liturgical plainchant repertory of the Roman Catholic Church, used primarily in the orbit of the southern Italian ecclesiastical centers of Benevento and Monte Cassino distinct from Gregorian chant and related to Ambrosian chant. It was officially supplanted by the Gregorian chant of the Roman rite in the 11th century, although a few Beneventan chants of local interest remained in use.

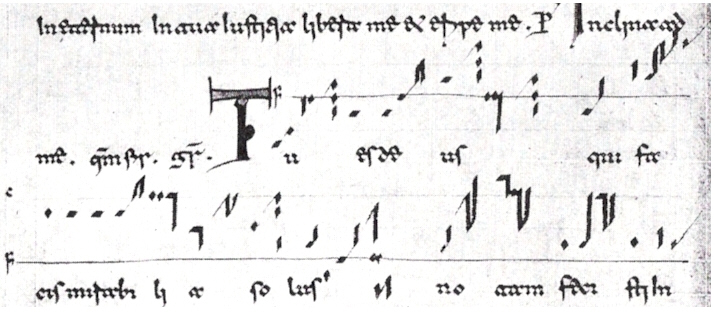
“Tu es deus” in beneventan notation

== History ==
During the Lombard occupation of the 7th and 8th centuries, a distinctive liturgical rite and plainchant tradition developed in Benevento. It included feasts of special local importance such as the Holy Twelve Brothers of Benevento. At the time it was called cantus ambrosianus ("Ambrosian chant"), although it is a separate plainchant tradition from the chant of Milan which is called Ambrosian chant. The common use of the name cantus ambrosianus, the common influence of the Lombards in both Benevento and Milan, and musical similarities between the two liturgies and chant traditions suggest a Lombard influence in the origins of Beneventan chant.

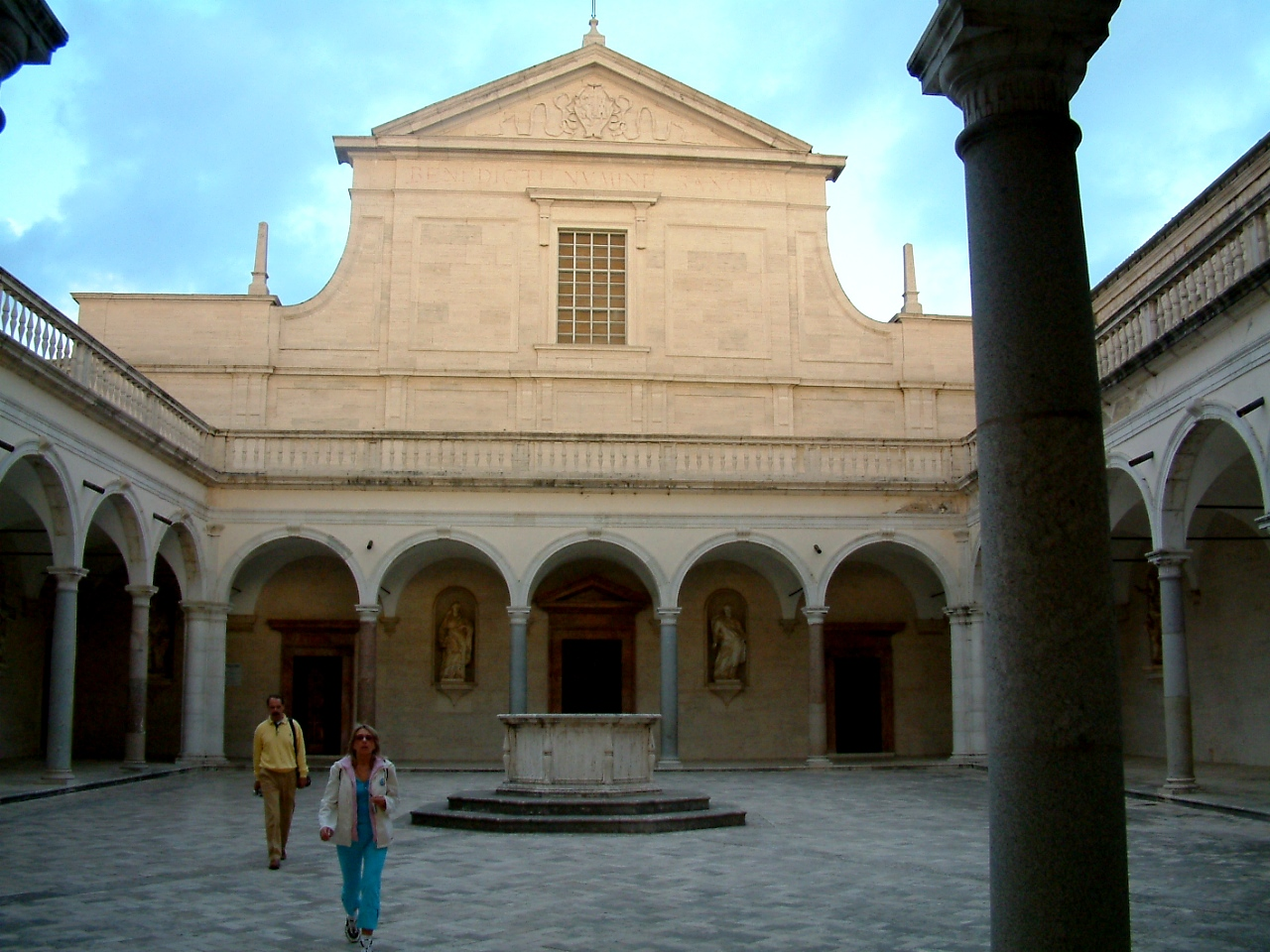
Façade of the church in Montecassino

Gregorian chant had already begun to take hold in the Beneventan orbit as early as the 8th century. The two traditions appear to have coexisted for about a century before the Gregorian chant began to replace the native Beneventan. Many Beneventan chants exist only as interpolations and addenda in Gregorian chantbooks, sometimes next to their corresponding chants in the Gregorian repertory. External ecclesiastical influences, such as two German abbots at Montecassino during the 11th century, led to an increasing insistence on the Roman rite and Gregorian chant instead of the local Beneventan traditions. One of these abbots later became Pope Stephen IX, who in 1058 officially outlawed the Beneventan rite and chant. A few Beneventan chants continued to be recorded and performed for a time, especially for the feasts of local importance such as the Holy Twelve Brothers, which had no Gregorian counterpart. However, the Beneventan repertory as a whole fell into disuse. This was commemorated in a legend of a singing contest between a Gregorian and a Beneventan cantor, which ended in victory for the Gregorian repertory when the Beneventan cantor fainted from exhaustion.

== General characteristics ==
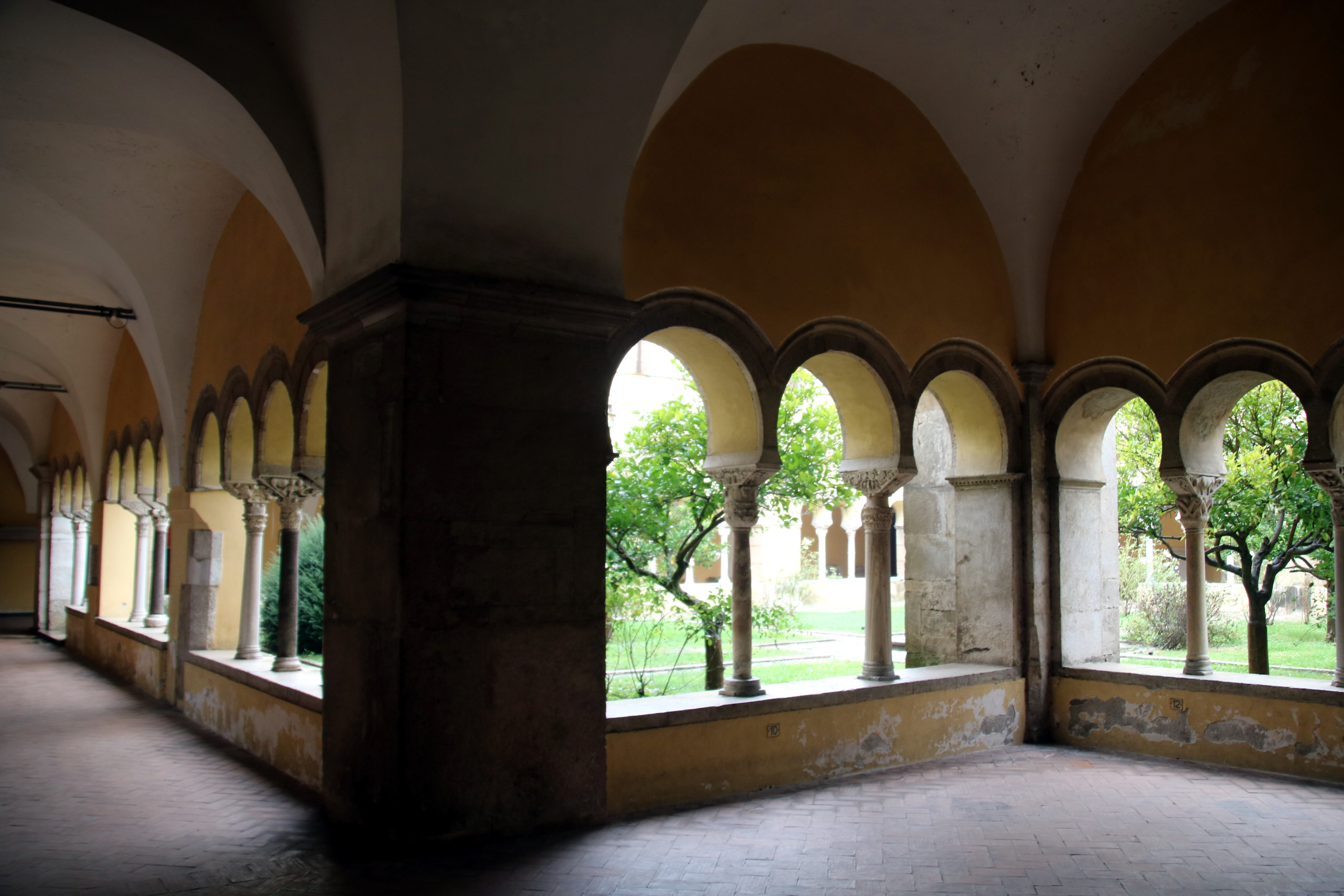
Cloister of Santa Sofia church (Benevento)

Beneventan chant is largely defined by its role in the liturgy of the Beneventan rite, which is more closely related to the liturgy of the Ambrosian rite than the Roman rite. The Beneventan rite has not survived in its complete form, although most of the principal feasts and several feasts of local significance are extant. The Beneventan rite appears to have been less complete, less systematic, and more liturgically flexible than the Roman rite; many Beneventan chants were assigned multiple roles when inserted into Gregorian chantbooks, appearing variously as antiphons, offertories, and communions, for example.

Like all plainchant, Beneventan chant is monophonic and a cappella. In accordance with Roman Catholic tradition, it is primarily intended to be sung by males. Like the other Italian chant repertories, the Old Roman chant and Ambrosian chant, the melodies are melismatic and ornate. The melodic motion is primarily stepwise, with a limited ambitus, giving the chants a smooth, undulating feel. Unlike Ambrosian chants, Beneventan chants do not notably specify whether any given chant is meant to be sung by the choir or by any particular singer. The chants almost all end on one of two pitches, a G or an A, and thus do not fit into the Gregorian system of eight modes.

What most distinguishes Beneventan chant is its frequent and repeated use of various short melodic motifs. Although this technique is used in other chant traditions, such as the centonization of melodic formulae in the Gregorian Graduals, it is far more frequently used in Beneventan chant than in the other Western plainchant traditions.

== Chants of the Office ==
Many Beneventan antiphons have psalmody, but no specifically Beneventan style can be distinguished from the Gregorian sources in which it survives. Unlike the Ambrosian rite, there is no special service for nightfall, but there are about fifty extant antiphons and five responsories. Only antiphons for Sunday services survive. Much melodic material is shared among the antiphons and among the responsories.

== Chants of the Mass ==
With rare exceptions, only Proper chants (chants which vary depending on the feast) for the Mass survive. As in the Ambrosian rite, a threefold Kyrie was sung to a simple melody following the Gloria, but this was not analogous to the more complex Kyrie of the Gregorian repertory.

In the Beneventan rite, the Proper of the Mass included an Ingressa, Alleluia, Offertory, Communion, and in six extant Masses, a Gradual.

Ingressae, as in the Ambrosian rite, are elaborate chants sung without psalm verses. They are analogous to the Gregorian Introit. Alleluias appear in every Mass except the Masses of Holy Week. Most of them share a single melody. Offertories and Communions are melodically more simple. Some Masses have two Communion chants. Some Communion chants appear in other services as the Offertory chant, or as a simple antiphon.
