= St Francis Xavier Church, Enkhuizen =

Roman Catholic church in Enkhuizen, Netherlands

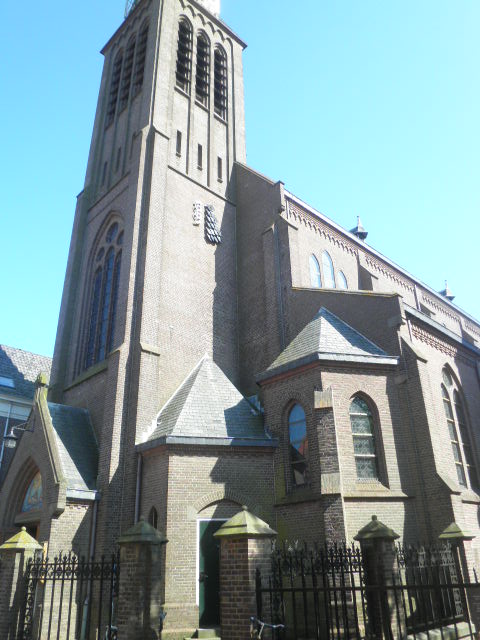
Front entrance

St Francis Xavier Church (Dutch, Sint-Franciscus Xaveriuskerk) is a Roman Catholic Parish church in Enkhuizen, West Friesland, Netherlands. It was founded and is run by the Society of Jesus and is in the Diocese of Haarlem-Amsterdam. It is situated on Westerstraat 107 and was built in 1905 on the site of a clandestine church. The baptismal font is a registered national monument.

== History ==
The church is on the same location of a former Jesuit church that was not visible from the street. The church was built in 1905 and is dedicated to St Francis Xavier, one of the founders of the Jesuits. The architect was Nicolaas Molenaar Sr., who designed the church in a Gothic Revival style. From 1929 to 1930, the church was enlarged and the tower was designed by his son Nicolaas Molenaar Jr. In 1989, it was decided that the tower was unstable and would be demolished. However, the proposed demolition was prevented. Instead, in 1991, the restoration work on the tower was completed and a plaque recording this was mounted.

In 2012, it was determined that the church building was dilapidated and had to be closed. The parish therefore had to find a new building. Initially, a preliminary agreement was reached with the Westerkerk Foundation for a community center at the Westerkerk, but this did not materialize. In 2015, the former library building on Kwakerspad was acquired and used as a church in December of that year. However, the Diocese of Haarlem-Amsterdam plans to close the new church in the old library again in a few years due to steadily declining attendance in Southeast West Friesland. Catholics from Enkhuizen will then be referred to St. Martinus Church in nearby Bovenkarspel.

By episcopal decree of June 1, 2018, the church building was officially closed for worship, effective July 1, 2018.

== Interior ==
Inside, the church is covered with painted diagonal rib vaulting. The church has a Gothic Revival Marian altar with a representation of the sacrifice of Abraham. An image of the crucifixion of Jesus between two thieves on Calvary hangs above the entrance to the church.

The baptismal font is a national monument. It is made out of 18th-century oak in the baroque style. The font has the shape of a globe, together with the figures of Adam and Eve about to be expelled from the Garden of Eden. Above them are depicted two angels, one with a flaming sword and the other an angel of peace. Above the globe is a painting of Jesus being crucified.

== Gallery ==
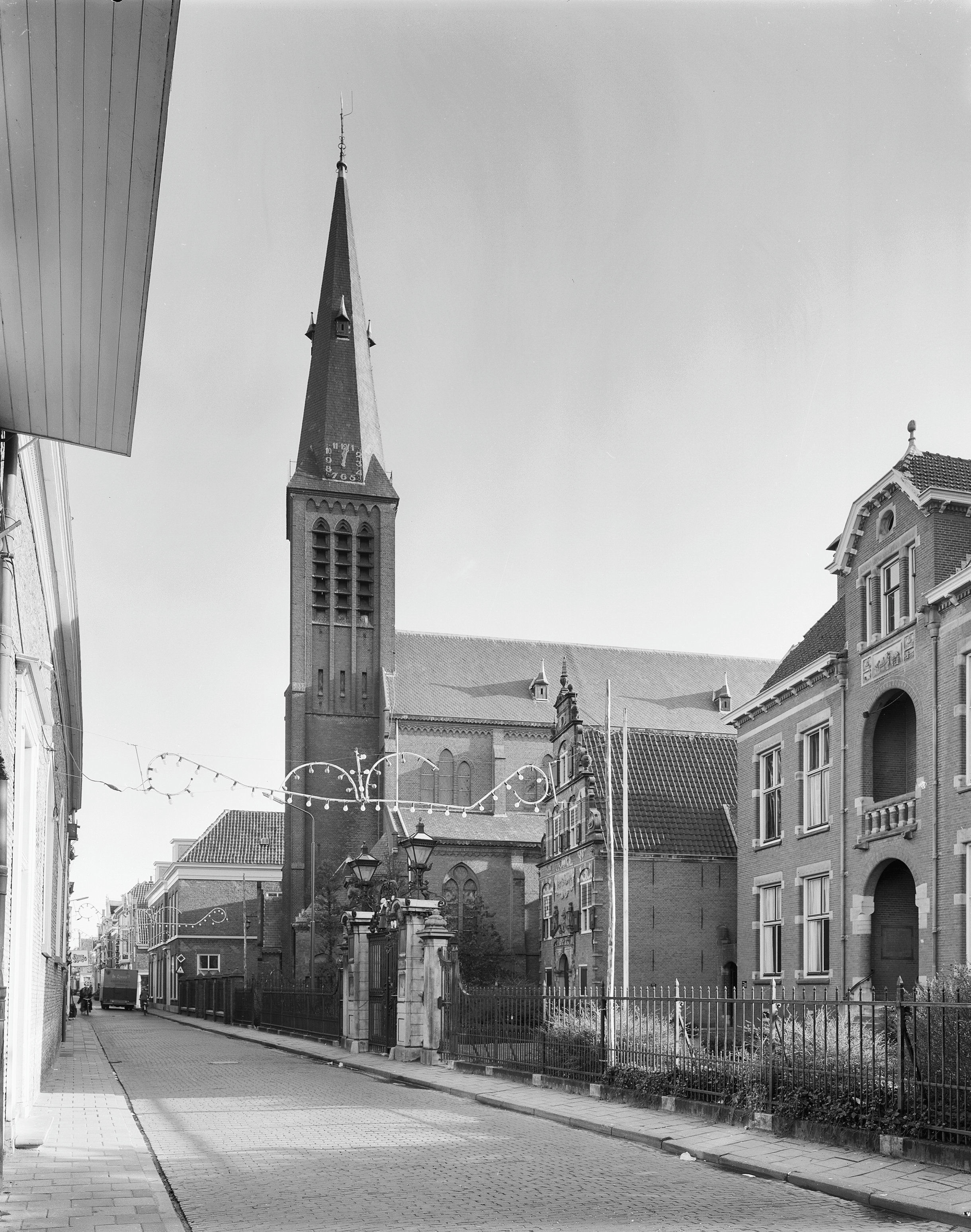
View down Westerstraat

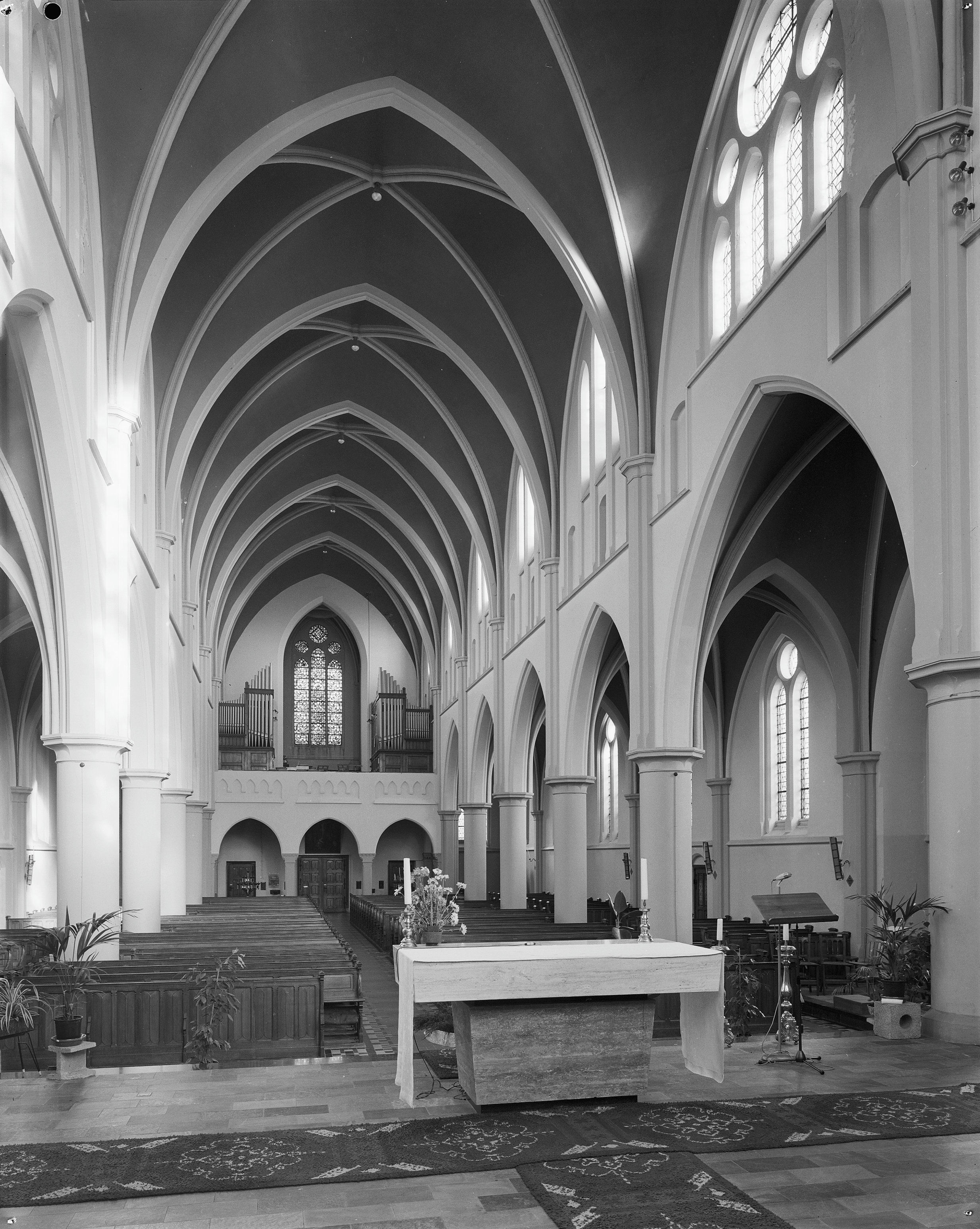
Sanctuary

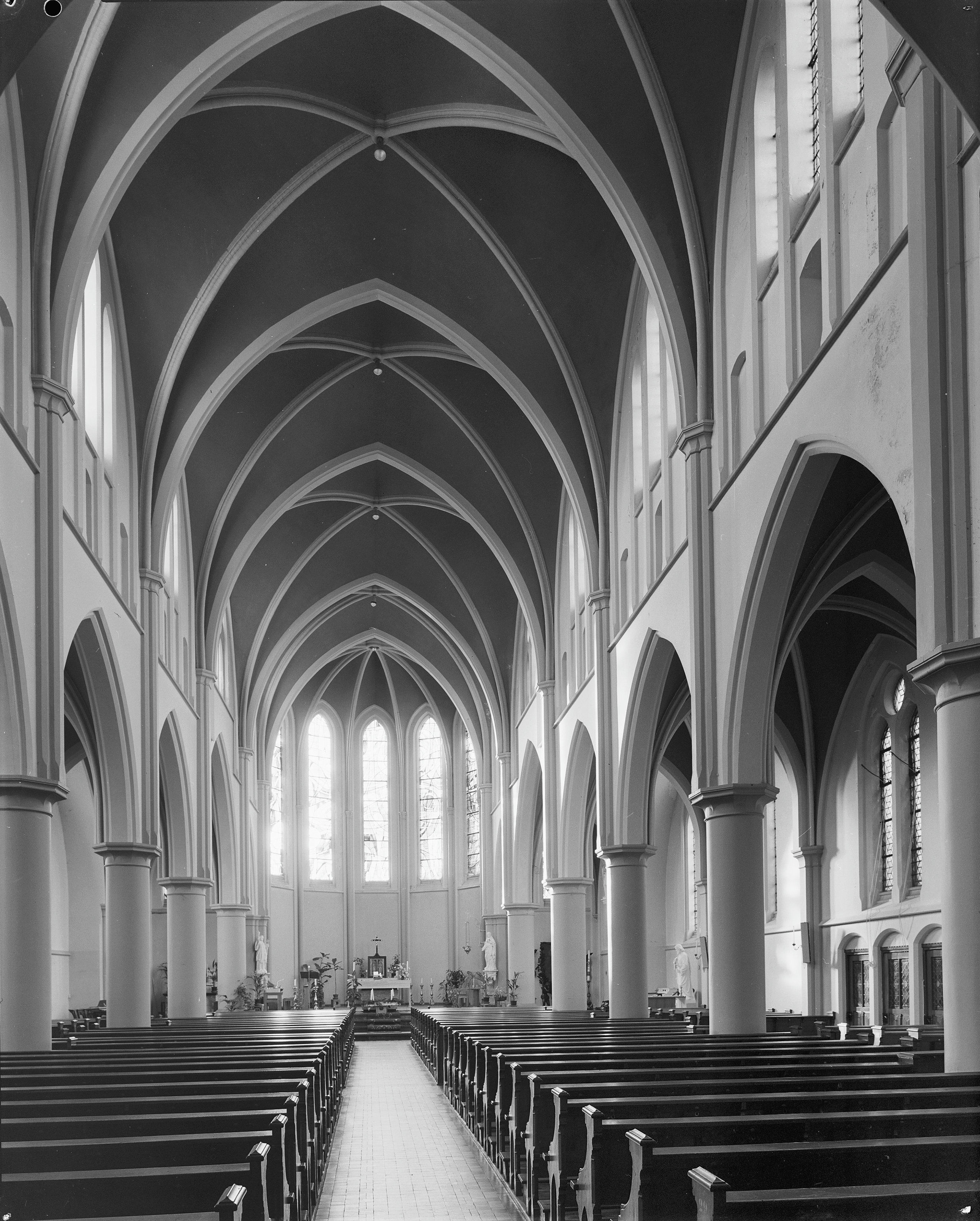
Nave

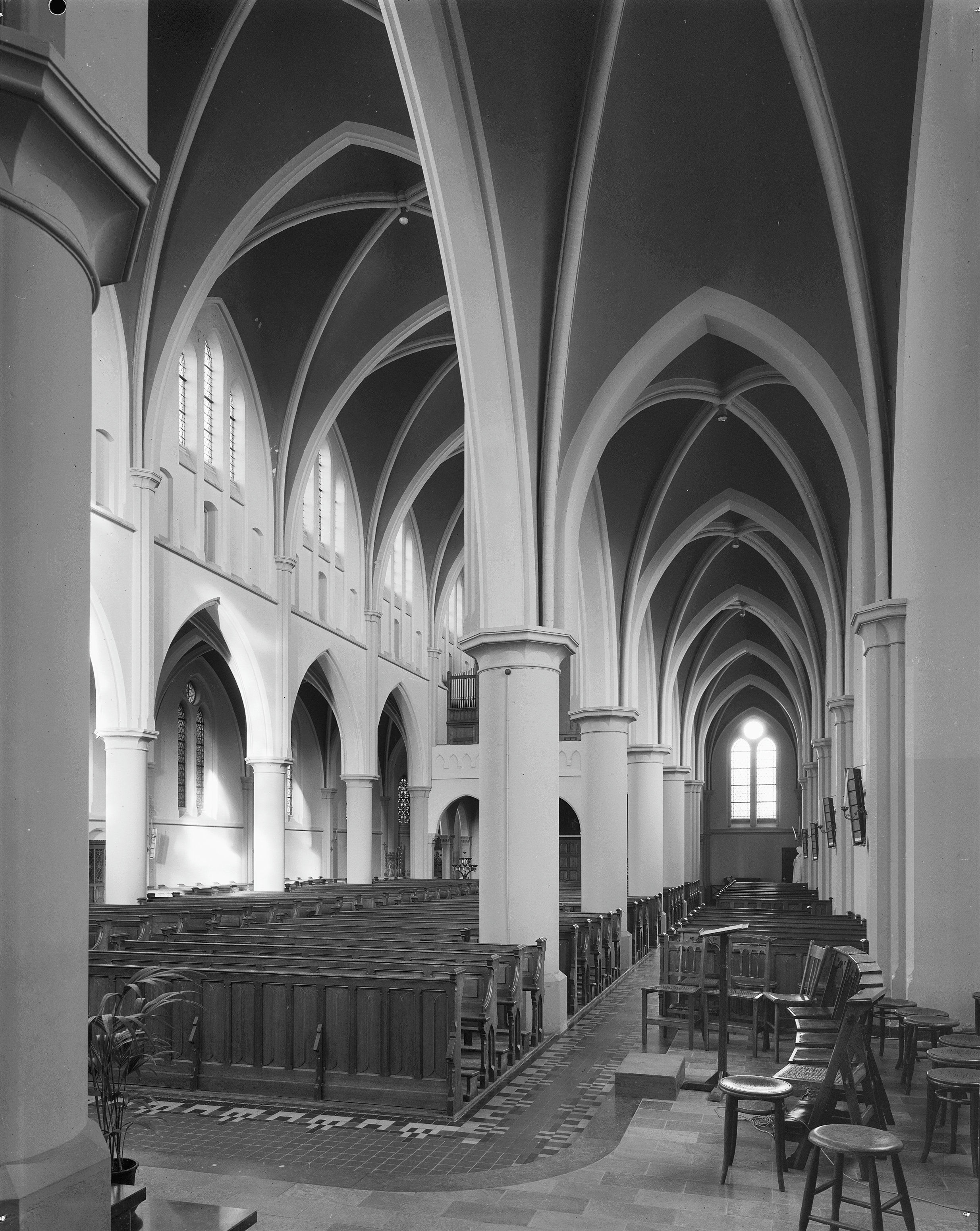
Side aisle

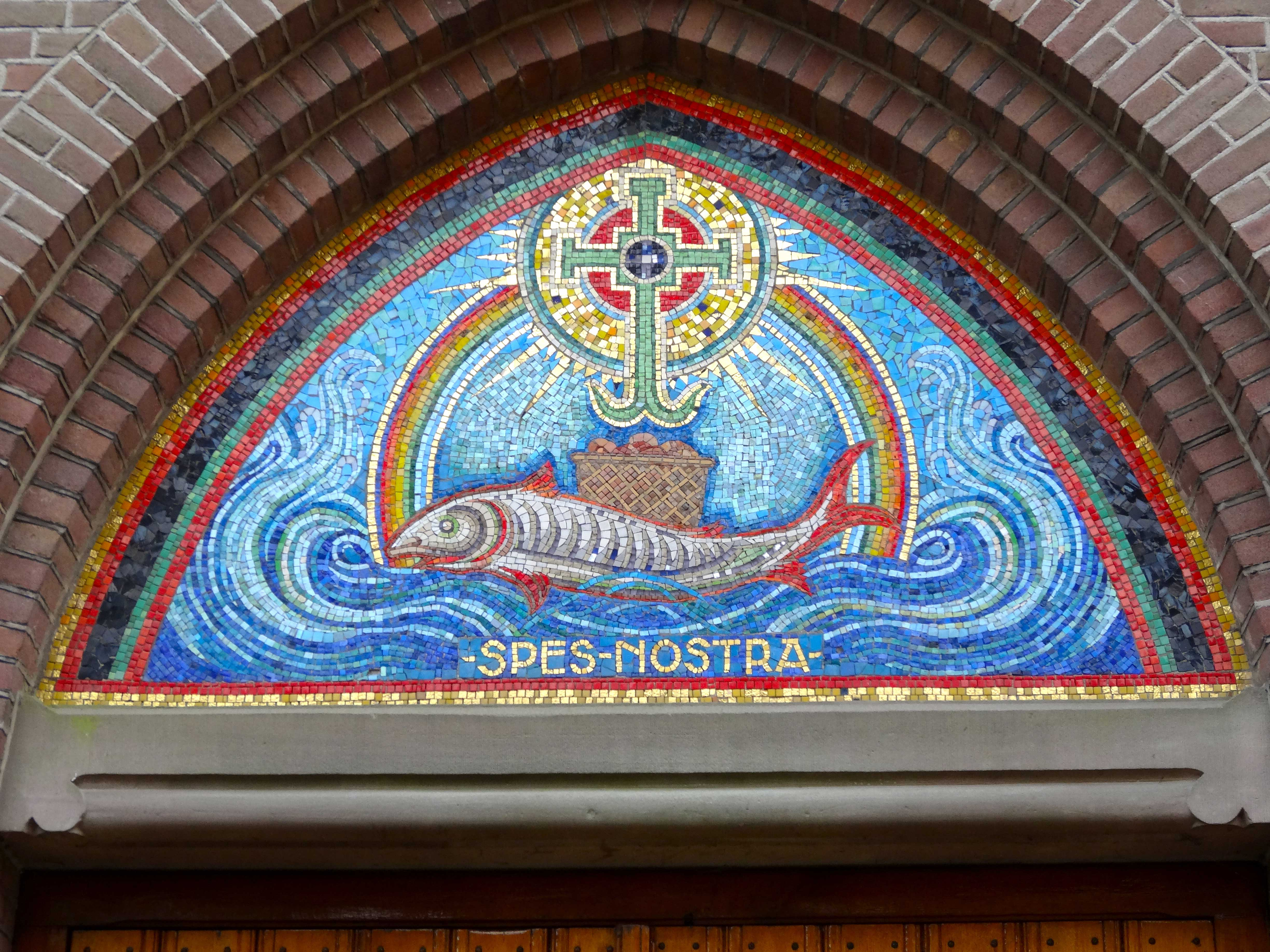
Above entrance

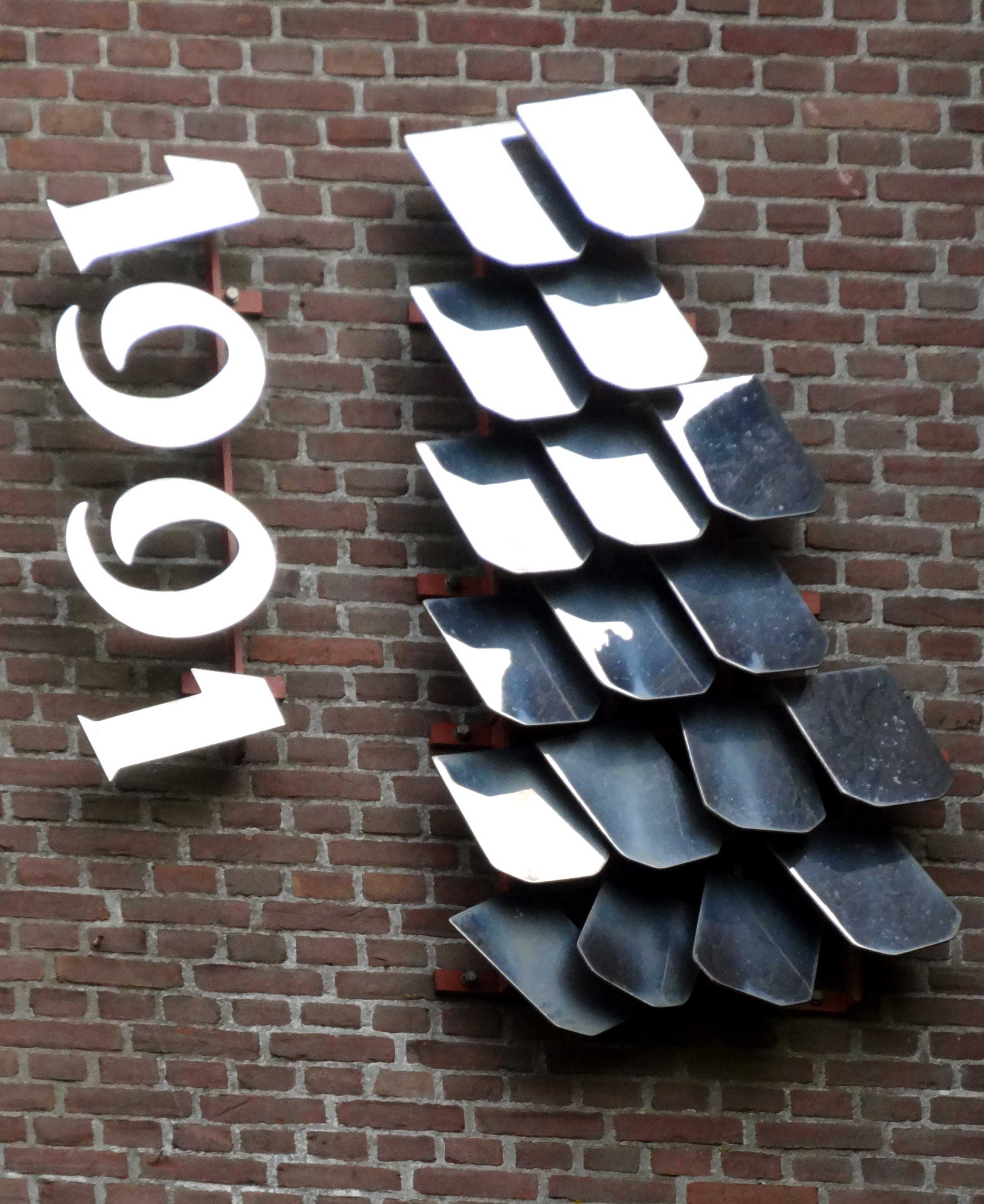
Restoration Plaque

== See also ==
- Society of Jesus
- List of Jesuit sites in the Netherlands
- List of Catholic churches in the Netherlands
