= Jakob Middendorp =

Dutch Catholic theologian, churchman, academic and historian

Jakob Middendorp (Latin Jacobus Middendorpius) (c. 1537, Twente – 13 January 1611, Cologne) was a Dutch Catholic theologian and churchman, academic and historian.

== Life ==
Middendorp was born about 1537 in Oldenzaal, or perhaps Ootmarsum, as he called himself Otmersensis on the title page of his work De celebrioribus Academiis. He studied the humanities at the Fragerherren gymnasium of Zwolle, philosophy and jurisprudence at Cologne University, where he became doctor of philosophy and both branches of law, and also licentiate of theology; he also taught peripatetic philosophy at the Montanum gymnasium there.

He remained in Westphalia during the troubles in the Archdiocese of Cologne in the time of Archbishop Gebhard Truchsess von Waldburg, and was professor at various foreign academies; afterwards he returned to Cologne, where he passed the greater part of his life. In 1580 he became dean of St. Maria ad gradus, Cologne, in 1596 dean of St. Andreas, and in 1601 canon of the cathedral chapter. Rector of Cologne University from 1580 to 1581 and from 1602 to 1604, he was appointed vice-chancellor by the coadjutor, Ferdinand of Bavaria, in 1602. He lies buried in the church of St. Andreas.

== Works ==
As an author he was best known by his De celebrioribus universi orbis Academiis, libri II, a pioneer work in the history of education and universities. It gave legendary foundations for European higher education, and its history was contaminated by the forgeries of Annius of Viterbo, factors leading to its being discounted by later authors.

He also published:

- Officiorum scholasticorum libri duo, quorum prior tam iuventutis quam populi Christiani magistrorum qui divinas et humanas literas publice privatimque docent, munus edisserit, posterior vero praecipua auditorum populique offica complectitur (Cologne, 1570);
- Historiam Aristeae versae per LXX interprets Scripturae sacrae ex MS. codicibus Graecis et Latinis restituit et commentario illustravit (Cologne, 1603);
- Historia monastica, quae religiosae et solitariae vitae originem, progressiones, incrementa et naturam ex scriptura Sacra, ex pontifico et Caesareo jure, ex antiquissimis historiis, ex veterum Patrum et librorum scriptis demonstrat (Cologne, 1603).
