= We Are Church International =

Catholic movement

We Are Church International is an international movement founded in Rome in 1996 and registered under French law, which, by its own description, aims to support the renewal of the Catholic Church on the basis of the teachings of the Second Vatican Council (1962-1965) "and the theological spirit developed from it".

The movement began during the Church Referendum in Austria in 1995, in reaction to the paedophilia scandal around Vienna's Cardinal Groer. We are Church is represented in more than twenty countries on all continents and networks world-wide with similar-minded reform groups.

As international studies of renowned religion sociologists confirm, We are Church as a reform movement within the Church represents the "voice of the people in the pews" and has demonstrated this in several Shadow Synods in Rome. We Are Church has proposed radical changes on various doctrinal and disciplinary points in Roman Catholicism, including the abolition of mandatory priestly celibacy, female ordination, openness to contraception, abortion, assisted suicide, same-sex parenting, and the democratization of church structures, with a direct decision-making role for the laity.

It has described Hans Küng as the spiritual father of initiatives that led to the founding of We Are Church.

== Organization ==
The association is composed of groups in various countries and does not accept individual members. A list of its national Media Contacts, with e-mail addresses and in some cases telephone numbers, is given on its website.

== Objectives ==
Proclaimed in Rome in 12 October 1997, the collaborative developed a manifesto in 1997 which recalled the convening of the Second Vatican Council by Pope John XXIII and outlined five "demands" which focussed on equality within the Catholic Church.

== Initiatives ==
On 4 June 2008, in response to a decree of the Congregation for the Doctrine of the Faith that declared subject to an excommunication whose lifting was reserved to the Holy See anyone who attempted to confer holy orders on a woman, the international movement issued a statement under the heading, "Jesus Christ did not ordain men or women to the ministerial priesthood but to care for and nurture each other as brothers and sisters". In July of the same year, it congratulated the "Anglican Church" for its intention to consecrate women as bishops and declared its regret at "the unchristian attitude of the Vatican establishment which, once again, usurping its mission, has come out in criticism of our Anglican brothers and sisters over the decision".

In 2017 the association supported blessing of same-sex marriages.

== Excommunication of a foundress ==
On 22 March 2014, the Tiroler Tageszeitung published an interview with Martha Heizer, chairperson and co-founder of the international movement, and her husband, in which they stated that they had been informed that, in line with canon 1378 §2, they were excommunicated on account of their priestless "private Eucharistic celebrations".

== See also ==
- Church 2011
- Association of Catholic Priests - a voluntary association of Catholic clergy in Ireland
- Eighth of May Movement - a somewhat similar movement in the Netherlands that was disbanded in 2003.
