= Heilige Lodewijkkerk =

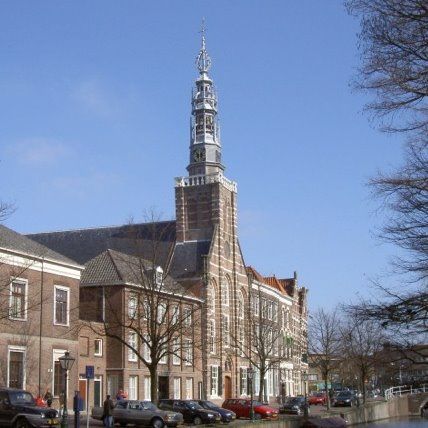
- Heilige Lodewijkkerk
- 52°9′21.7″N 4°29′29.8″E
- Location: Steenschuur 19; 2311 ES Leiden, Netherlands
- Country: Netherlands
- Denomination: Roman Catholic

Architecture
- Architect: Jan Giudici
- Years built: 1477

Administration
- Diocese: Rotterdam

Clergy
- Priest: J. Smith

The Heilige Lodewijkkerk (Dutch pronunciation: [ˈɦɛiləɣə ˈloːdəʋɛiˌkɛr(ə)k]), also translated as the Church of St. Louis, is a Roman Catholic church at the Steenschuur in Leiden.

== History ==
The first church on this place was built in 1477 and was a chapel, the St. James Chapel, belonging to a guesthouse for pilgrims on their way to Santiago de Compostela. This chapel was therefore dedicated to St. James the Great. The front facade of the church was built in 1538. The tower, which is still called the Saint James Tower, was built in 1594 and its carillon was built in 1598. The chapel and the guesthouse were sold in 1547 to the parish of the Pieterskerk and in 1567 to the municipality of Leiden. The municipality of Leiden used the chapel first to store cereal and afterwards to test textiles.

=== The explosion of 1807 ===
The history of the present Heilige Lodewijkkerk is tightly linked to the nearby explosion of a ship with gun powder in 1807. The explosion destroyed a large part of the city center including a catholic church at the Nieuwe Rijn. The St. James Chapel that was used to test textile was heavily damaged, but the tower was still intact. King Louis Bonaparte, also known as Lodewijk Napoleon ordered that the chapel would be rebuilt into a church for the Catholics who used to go to the church at the Nieuwe Rijn. The church was designed by Jan Giudici. Afterwards the church was dedicated to Saint Louis, known as Heilige Lodewijk in Dutch, who was the patron saint of Louis Bonaparte .

== Current use ==
Since 1957 the church is used by the Parochie Heilige Lodewijk. Every day Mass is celebrated. The church is known for its traditional liturgy in Dutch, English and Latin.

== Pictures from inside ==
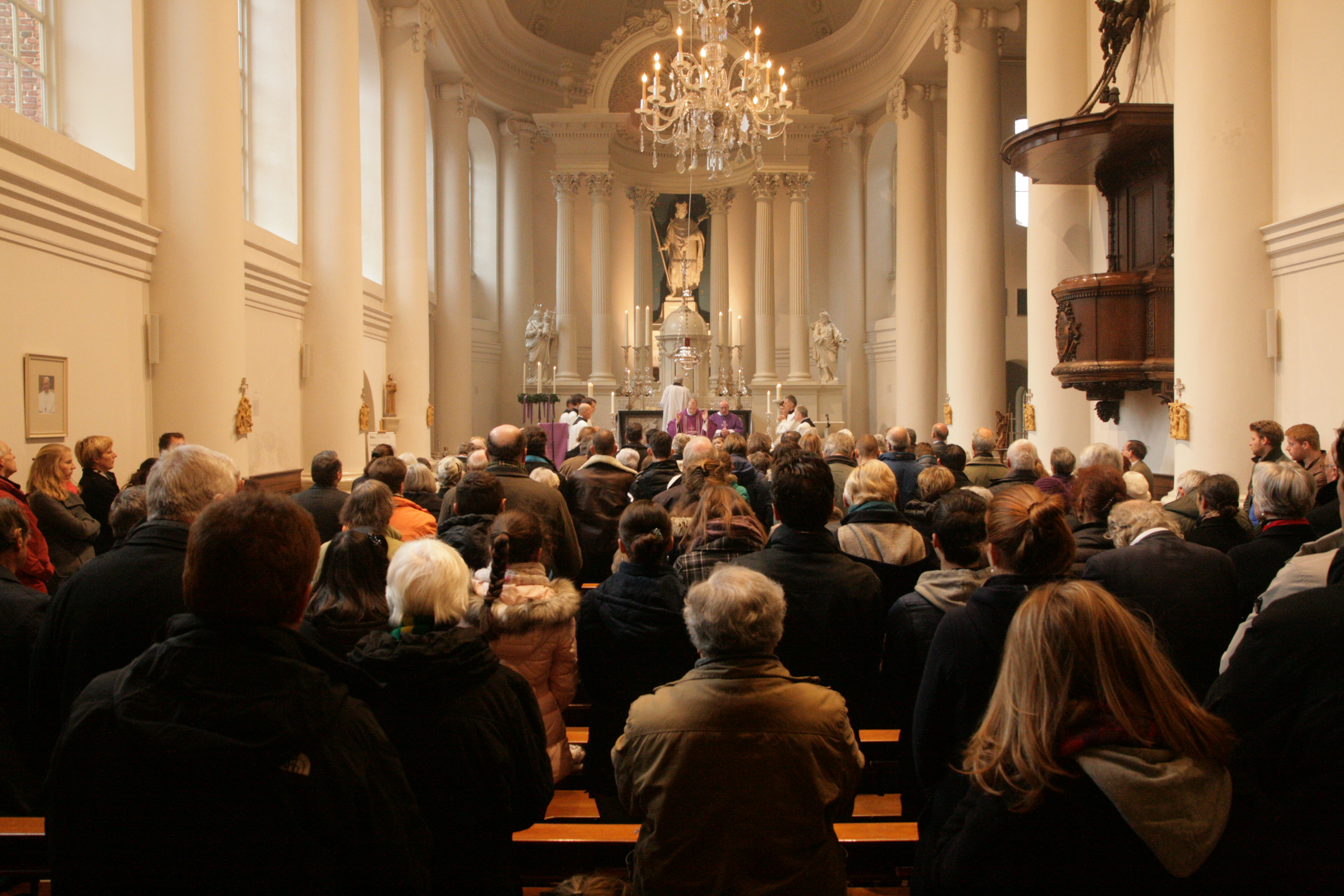

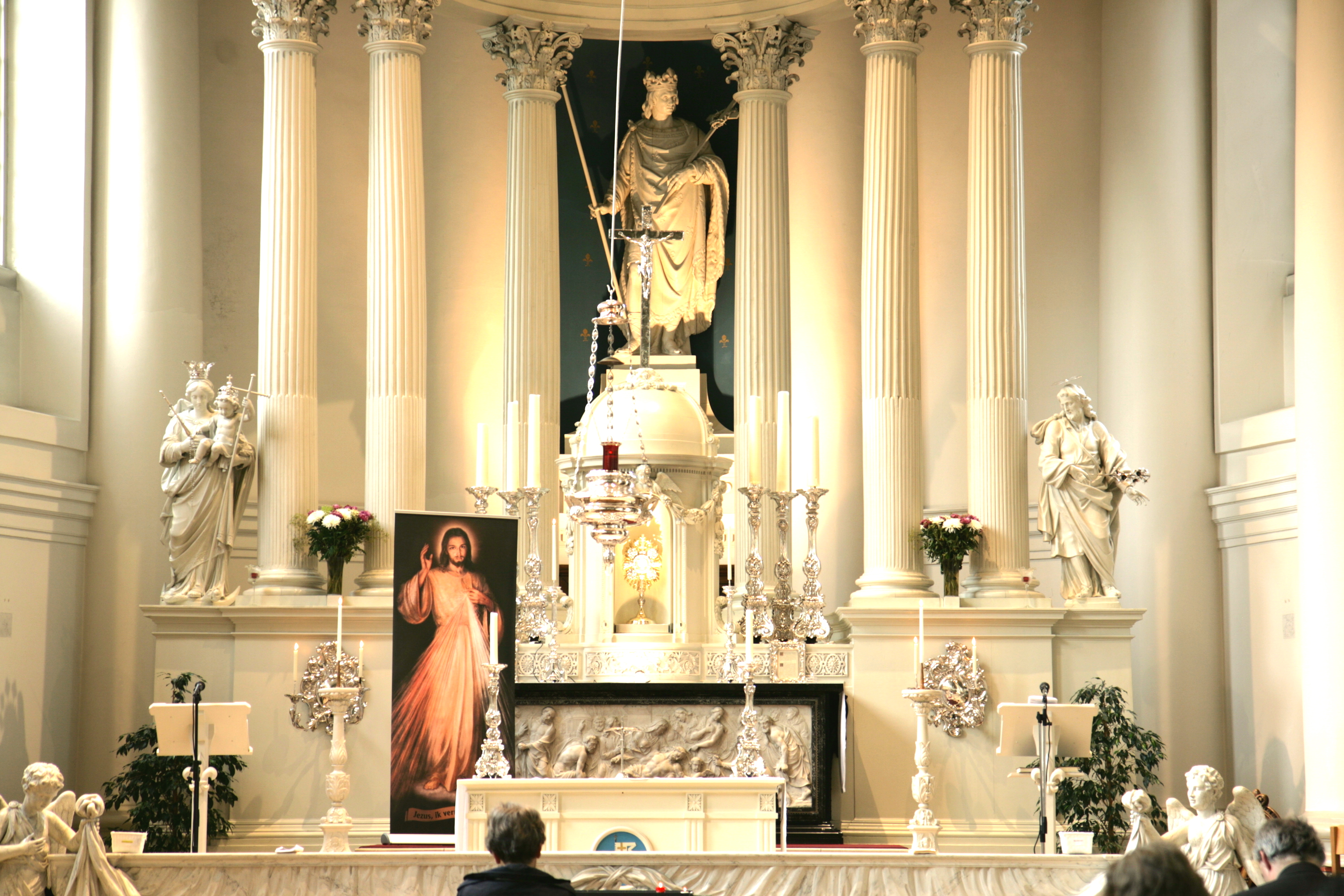

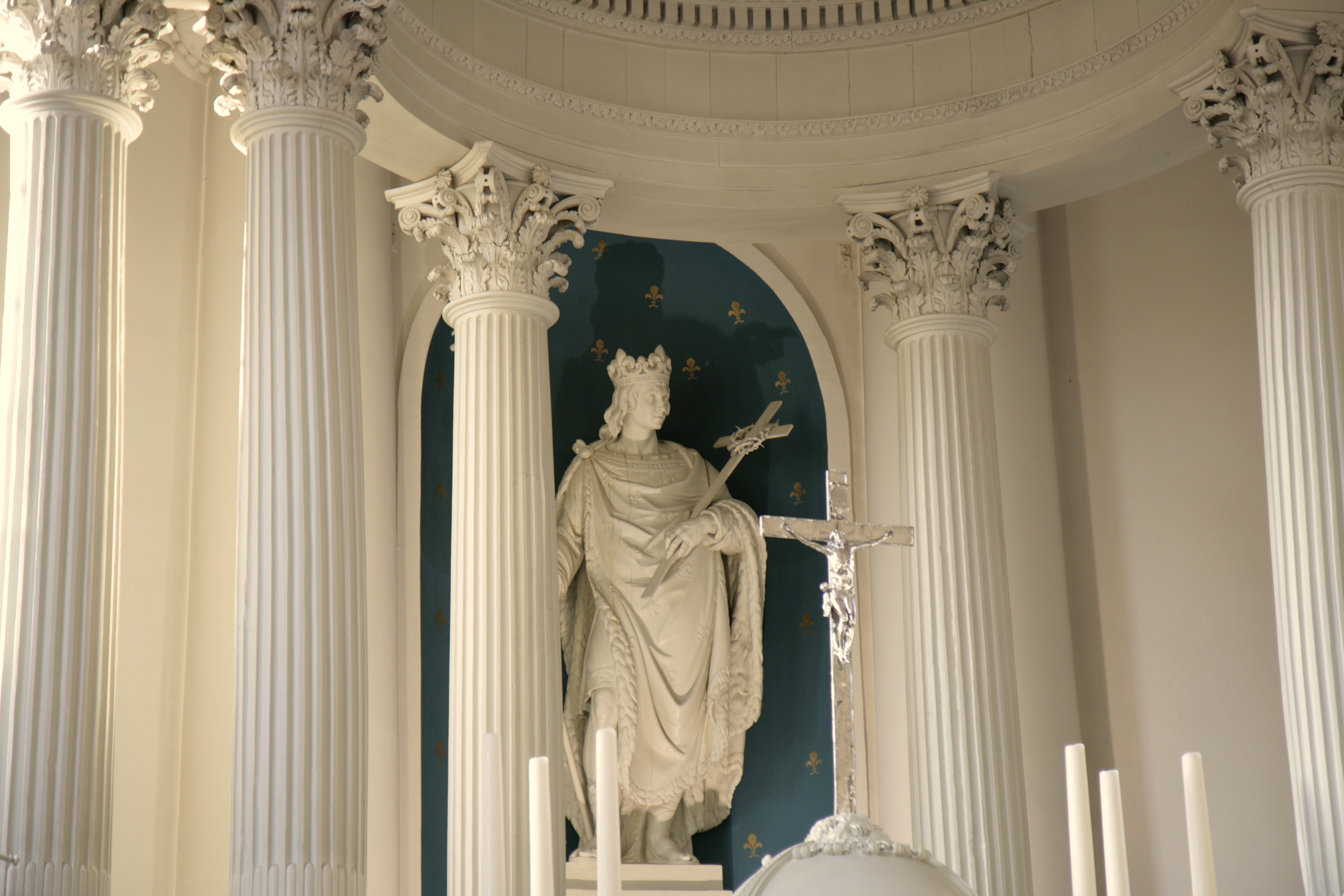
