= Ambrosian chant =

Liturgical plainchant repertory of the Ambrosian rite of the Roman Catholic Church

Ambrosian chant (also known as Milanese chant) is the liturgical plainchant repertory of the Ambrosian rite of the Roman Catholic Church, distinct from the more widely known Gregorian chant. It is primarily associated with the Archdiocese of Milan, and named after St. Ambrose much as Gregorian chant is named after Gregory the Great. It is the only surviving plainchant tradition besides the Gregorian to maintain the official sanction of the Roman Catholic Church.

== History ==
The history of Milan as a centre for religious music goes back to St. Ambrose, who is not known to have composed any of the Ambrosian chant repertory, much as Gregory the Great is not known to have composed any Gregorian chant. However, during his 4th-century tenure as bishop of Milan, he is credited with introducing hymnody from the Eastern Church to the West. Ambrose composed original hymns as well, four of which still survive, along with music that may not have changed too much from the original melodies.

Two methods of singing psalms or other chants are responsorial and antiphonal. In responsorial singing, the soloist (or choir) sings a series of verses, each one followed by a response from the choir (or congregation). In antiphonal singing, the verses are sung alternately by soloist and choir, or by choir and congregation. In the Western Church, formerly the responsorial method seems to have first been used alone, the antiphonal method was introduced by St. Ambrose.

Over time, the Milanese liturgy developed into the Ambrosian rite, which shares more in common with the Gallican and Mozarabic rites than with the Roman. Ambrosian chant developed to meet the particular needs of the Ambrosian liturgy. Although the Ambrosian rite is liturgically related to other rites and Ambrosian chant is musically related to other plainchant traditions, different categories of chant, different chant texts, and different musical styles make Ambrosian chant a distinct musical repertory. By the 8th century, this chant was attested to be normative across northern Italy, perhaps reaching into southern Italy as well.

Between the 8th and 13th centuries, however, the Carolingian chant commissioned by Charlemagne developed into what we now know as Gregorian chant, which began to influence and eventually replace most of the other Western plainchant traditions. By the 12th century, the Mozarabic, Gallican, Celtic, Old Roman, and Beneventan chant traditions had all been effectively superseded by Gregorian chant. Ambrosian chant alone survived, despite the efforts of several Popes over a period of several centuries to establish Gregorian hegemony. A chronicle by the Milanese historian Landolphus from around the year 1000 recounts a legend that two Sacramentaries, one Gregorian and one Ambrosian, were placed on an altar to see which chant had divine acceptance; miraculously, both books opened simultaneously, showing both were equally acceptable.

Ambrosian chant did not wholly escape Gregorian influence. The earliest 8th-century fragments, and the more complete chantbooks from the 11th and 12th centuries that preserve the first recorded musical notation, show marked differences between the Gregorian and Ambrosian repertories. Later additions to the Ambrosian repertory, whose style differs from the earlier chants, may reflect Gregorian influence. Although St. Charles Borromeo fought to keep the Ambrosian rite intact during Spanish occupation, a contemporary edition of Ambrosian chant, published by Perego in 1622, attempts to categorize the Ambrosian chants into the eight Gregorian modes, which is not generally accepted as an accurate reflection of the actual musical practice of the time.

Ambrosian chant has survived to the present day, although its use is now limited primarily to the greater part of the Archdiocese of Milan and environs, parts of Lombardy, and parts of the Swiss Diocese of Lugano. Most recently, it survived the changes to the liturgy established by Vatican II, in part due to the prior tenure of Pope Paul VI as Archbishop of Milan.

== General characteristics ==
Ambrosian chant is largely defined by its role in the liturgy of the Ambrosian rite, which is more closely related to the northern "Gallic" liturgies such as the Gallican rite and the Mozarabic rite than the Roman rite. Musically, however, Ambrosian chant is closely related to the Gregorian and Old Roman chant traditions. Many chants are common to all three, with musical variation.

Like all plainchant, Ambrosian chant is monophonic and a cappella. In accordance with Roman Catholic tradition, it is primarily intended to be sung by males, and many Ambrosian chants specify who is to sing them, using phrases such as cum Pueris (by a boys' choir) and a Subdiaconis (by the subdeacons).

Stylistically, the Ambrosian chant repertoire is not generally as musically uniform as the Gregorian. Ambrosian chants are more varied in length, ambitus, and structure. Even within individual categories of chant, Ambrosian chants vary from short and formulaic to prolix and melismatic, and may be freely composed or show significant internal melodic structure. Its most distinctive feature compared with other plainchant repertories is a significantly higher amount of stepwise motion, which gives Ambrosian melodies a smoother, almost undulating feel. In manuscripts with musical notation, the neume called the climacus dominates, contributing to the stepwise motion. More ornamental neumes such as the quilisma are nearly absent from the notated scores, although it is unclear whether this reflects actual performance practice, or is simply a consequence of the relatively late musical transcription.

The Gregorian system of modes does not apply to Ambrosian chant. Although there are no B♭notes indicated in the musical notation, it seems likely that they were understood, based on Guido d'Arezzo's description of the "more perdulcis Ambrosii."

Nearly all of the texts used in Ambrosian chant are biblical prose, not metrical poetry, despite Ambrose having introduced Eastern hymnody to the West. Ambrosian chant serves two main functions in the Ambrosian liturgy: to provide music for the chanting of the Psalms in the monastic Offices, and to cover various actions in the celebration of the Mass.

== Chants of the Office ==
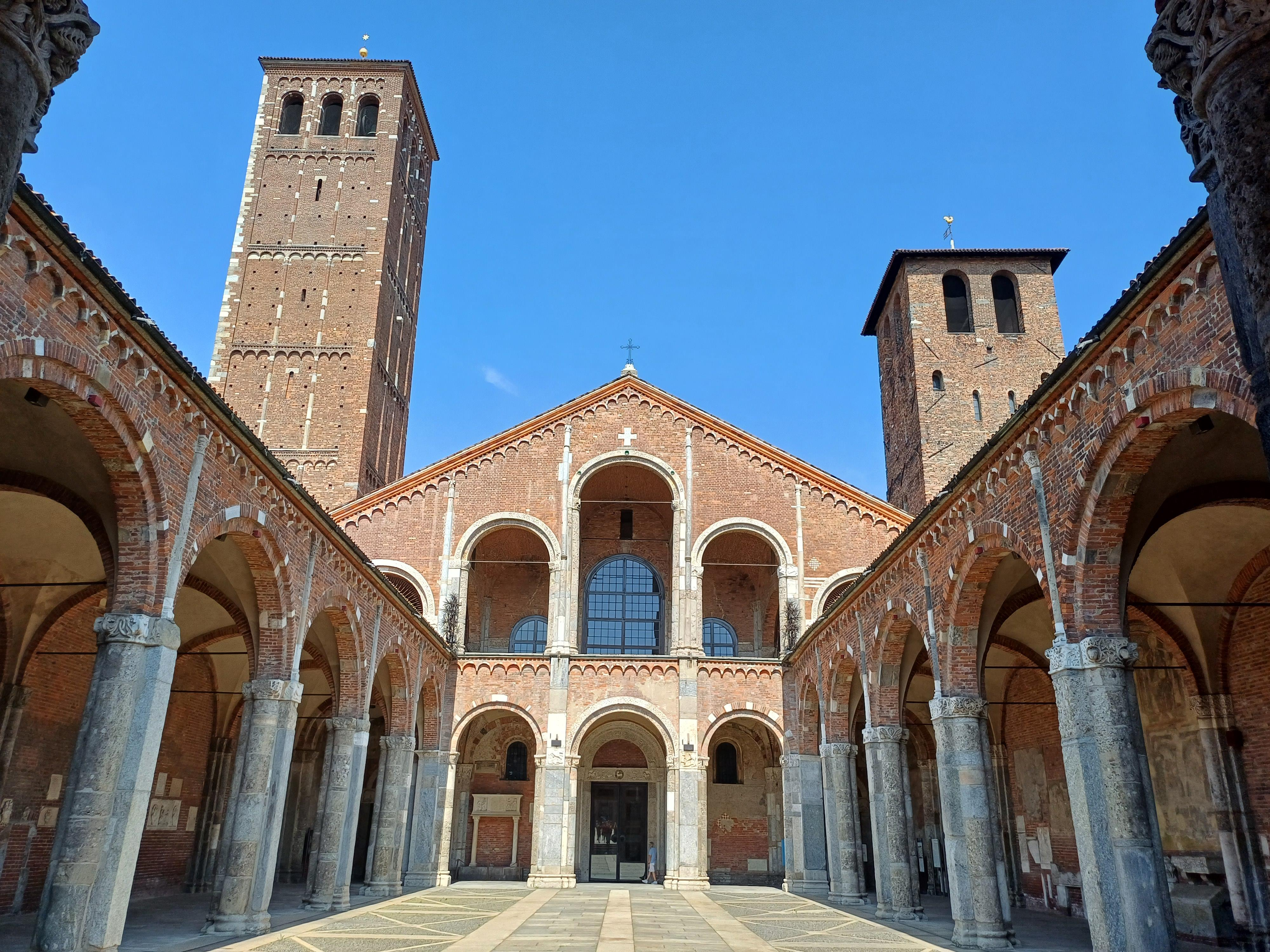
Sant'Ambrogio Basilica

The Office chants of the Ambrosian repertoire are still largely unresearched, so only preliminary evaluations have been made.

The minor hours have little of musical interest: some hymns, and the simplest of reciting tones only. The main chants of the Office are those of Matins, Vespers and the Vigils.

The Psalms are sung at Matins and Vespers in a rotating schedule so that all 150 Psalms are chanted every two weeks. The Psalms are each sung to a psalm tone, with a simple antiphon between each verse. The system of psalm tones in Ambrosian chant differs in several respects from the Gregorian system of psalm tones. In the Gregorian system, psalm tones are based on the mode of the antiphon. Ambrosian chants, including psalm antiphons, do not conform to the Gregorian system of modes. Each Ambrosian psalm antiphon belongs to one of four different series depending on its final pitch. Within each series, there are several possible psalm tones corresponding to the predominant pitch of the antiphon, which may or may not correspond to the "dominant" pitch of Gregorian modes. Finally, each psalm tone is given a cadential formula that lets the tone segue smoothly back into the antiphon. This system results in a much larger number of possible psalm tones in Ambrosian chant than exists in Gregorian chant. Structurally, psalm tones in Ambrosian chant consist of an incipit, a recitation formula, and a cadence, lacking the mediant flex found in Gregorian psalm tones.

Other Vespers chants include the Psallendae and the Antiphonae in choro. Psallendae comprise the largest category of Ambrosian Office chants. Two Psallendae, similar to the Marian antiphons of Gregorian chant, are performed on the more solemn Vespers, to cover processions. They conclude with one of several recitation tones that segue into the Gloria Patri. Antiphonae in choro are similar in style, but have no psalm or verse.

Responsoria occur in both Matins and Vespers. Their names often identify who is to sing them: the boys' choir, the deacon, the subdeacons, and so on. A Responsorium usually consists of a refrain called a respond, a verse, and a repetition of an expanded part of the respond. These expansions contain some of the longest melismas of the Ambrosian chant repertoire, which often contain complex repeat structures.

Vespers begin with a chant called the Lucernarium and end with the Completorium. The word Lucernarium hearkens back to the original function of Vespers as a time of lighting lamps, and the texts of Lucernaria usually contain some reference to light, such as Quoniam tu illuminas, Paravi lucernam, and Dominus illuminatio. Stylistically, Lucernaria and Completaria vary. Some are proper, specific to certain feasts, while others are ordinary and can be used throughout the year. They range from highly elaborate chants to simple reciting tones. There are relatively few Lucernaria and Completaria; four Completaria are used for all but three days of the year.

== Chants of the Mass ==
The Mass is the Christian celebration of the Eucharist. Plainchant occurs prominently in the Mass for several reasons: to communally affirm the faith, to expand on the scriptural lessons, and to accompany certain actions. The chants of the Mass divide into the ordinary, whose texts are invariable, and the proper, whose texts change depending on the feast. There are several differences between the Ambrosian rite and the Roman rite, which are reflected in the Ambrosian and Gregorian chant traditions.

=== Ordinary chants of the Mass ===
The ordinary chants consist of the Laus Missa or Gloria, the Symbolum, and the Sanctus. The Symbolum corresponds to the Credo in the Roman rite. Unlike Gregorian chant, there is no Agnus Dei nor Ite missa est, and the Kyrie does not exist as a separate category of chant.

Only a small number of each of these ordinary chants exist: four Gloria melodies, four Sanctus melodies, and just one melody for the Symbolum. The Symbolum melody is quite simple, just a slightly ornamented reciting tone. Of the four Gloria melodies, one is simple like the Symbolum melody, one is an expanded version of the simple melody, and one is a freely composed syllabic and neumatic melody consisting of only one or just a few pitches per syllable. The fourth melody is elaborately melismatic. All four melodies segue into a very simple threefold Kyrie chant.

Only two of the few Sanctus melodies are regularly used, both fairly simple.

=== Proper chants of the Mass ===
The Ingressa corresponds to the Introit in the Roman rite. Unlike the Introit, the Ingressa has no psalm verse or doxology. While the Introit fills in the time that the celebrant processes to the altar, the Ingressa is sung during the censing of the altar.

The next three proper chants follow and amplify three readings from Scripture. The Psalmellus follows the Prophecy, the Old Testament reading, and corresponds to the Gregorian Gradual. The Post Epistolam or Alleluia follows the reading of the Epistle, and corresponds to the Gregorian Alleluia. Ambrosian Alleluias show an even higher degree of adaptation, reusing melodies for the texts of different feasts, than do the Gregorian Alleluias. Unlike the Gregorian Alleluia, the Ambrosian Alleluia kept an extended repeat called the jubilus. During penitential periods, the Post Epistolam is replaced by the Cantus, which corresponds to the Gregorian Tract. The Cantus melodies belong to a common type, related to the Old Roman and Beneventan chant traditions. The chant following the final lesson, from the Gospel, is the Post Evangelium, which has no counterpart in the Roman Rite.

The Offertorium is sung during the bringing of gifts to the altar, corresponding to the Gregorian Offertory. While the Gregorian Offertories had lost their verses by the 12th century, some Ambrosian Offertoria retained their verses, every bit as complex as their defunct Gregorian counterparts.

The Confractorium is sung during the breaking of the bread, which has no counterpart in Gregorian chant. Finally, the Transitorium, so called because it originally involved the transfer of a book to the opposite side of the altar, corresponds to the Gregorian Communion. Many Transitorium texts are direct translations of Greek originals, although the melodies are not demonstrably Byzantine.

The Ingressa, Post Evangelium, Confractorium, and Transitorium never have verses, while the other chants may have responds and verses, up to three verses for some Cantus melodies. The Psalmellus, Post Evangelium, Offertoria, and Transitoria sometimes show complex repeat structures.

== Sources ==
- Jesson, Roy (1990). Ambrosian Chant. In Willi Apel, Gregorian Chant, pp. 465–483. Bloomington: Indiana University Press. ISBN 0-253-20601-4
- Ricossa, Luca (2011–12), Luca Ricossa, "Antiphonale Ambrosianum" (complete edition of the medieval ambrosian antiphoner, with original musical notation and complete liturgical context). Voll. I - II - III - IV - (V)
- Hiley, David (1995). Western Plainchant: A Handbook. Clarendon Press. ISBN 978-0-19-816572-9.
- Hoppin, Richard (1978). Medieval Music. W. W. Norton & Company. ISBN 978-0-393-09090-1.
