= Church of St. Peter and St. Paul, Amsterdam =

De Papegaai
- Church of Ss Peter and Paul "De Papegaai"
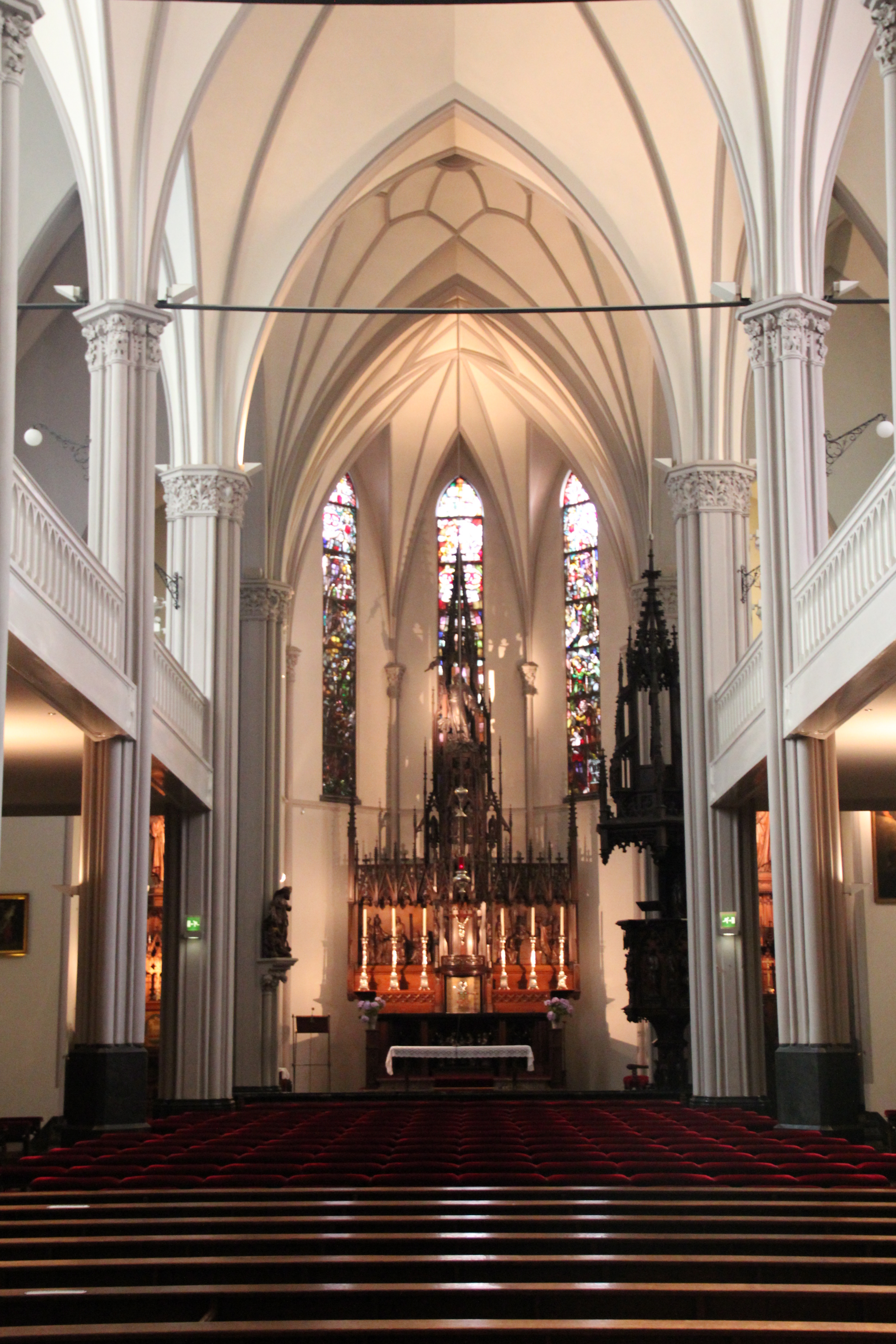
- De Papegaai
- 52°22′16″N 4°53′30″E
- Location: Kalverstraat 58; 1012 RL Amsterdam
- Country: Netherlands
- Denomination: Roman Catholic
- Website: www.nicolaas-parochie.nl

Architecture
- Years built: c. 1700

Administration
- Diocese: Haarlem-Amsterdam
- Parish: Amsterdam St Nicholas

De Papegaai is the lesser of the two parochial churches in the St Nicholas Roman Catholic parish in Amsterdam. The church is dedicated to Saints Peter and Paul. It is nicknamed "De Papegaai" (The Parrot) because it was originally hidden in a garden behind a regular housefront that belonged to a bird-trader in the days when Catholicism could not be practised publicly. Today there is a narrow, Neo-Gothic facade flanked by statues of Saint Joseph and a perched parrot. The church is on the busy Kalverstraat just south of Dam Square, and invites people in for quiet, as well as celebrating Sunday Mass (Post-Vatican II Mass) in Latin with Gregorian chant. It is the home of the vocal ensemble Gregoriana Amsterdam.

== Services ==
- Sunday:
  - 1030 Sung Mass in Latin
  - 1215 Sung Mass in Latin
- Monday-Saturday
  - 1030 Eucharist
