= Gerardus de Vet =

Dutch catholic bishop

- Bishop of Breda
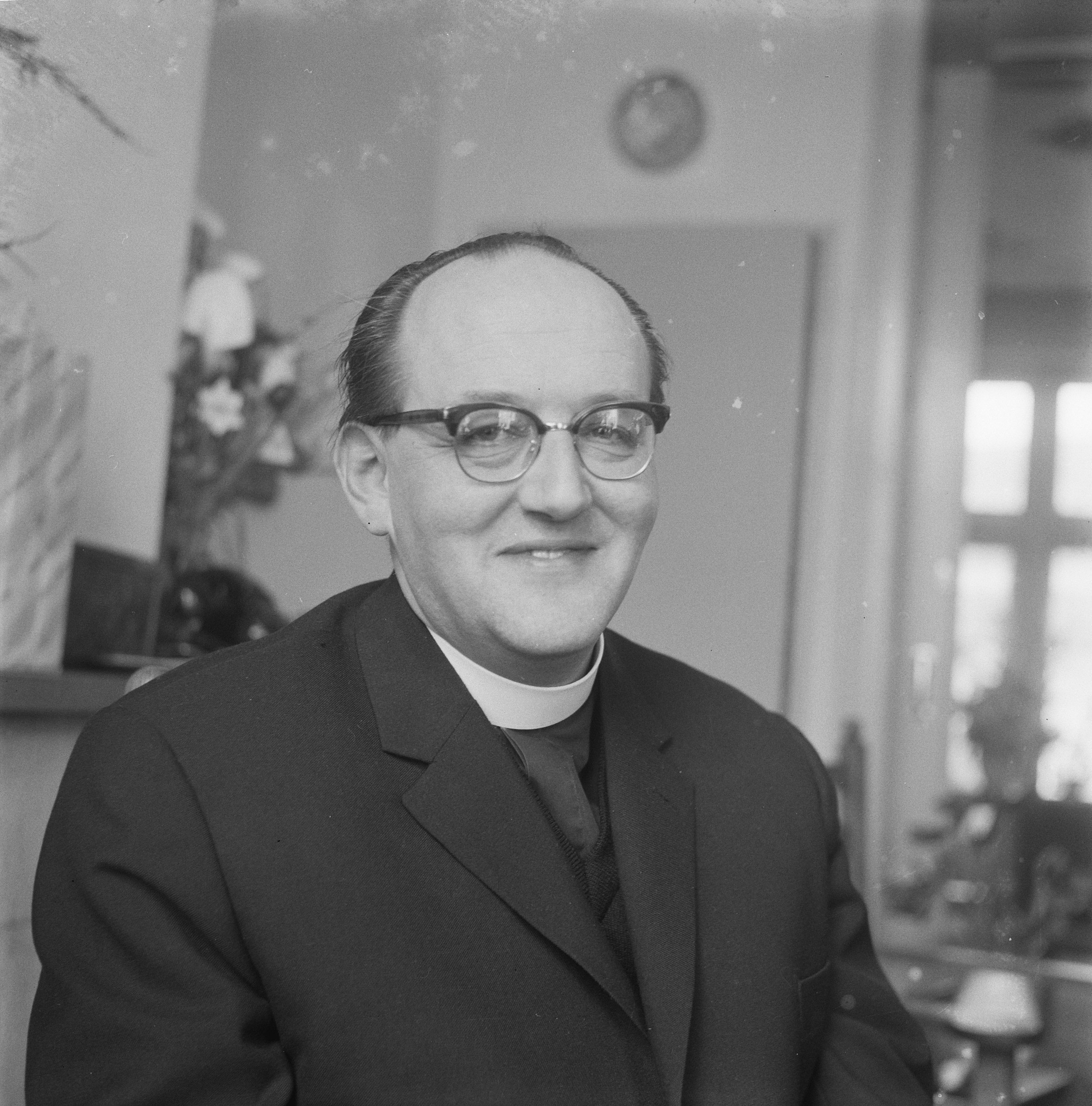
- Gerardus de Vet in 1962
- Church: Catholic Church
- Diocese: Diocese of Breda
- In office: 22 March 1962 – 27 March 1967
- Predecessor: Jozef Baeten
- Successor: Hubertus Ernst

Orders
- Ordination: 19 June 1943
- Consecration: 13 May 1962 by Jozef Baeten

Personal details
- Born: Gerardus Henricus de Vet; 15 November 1917 Gilze, Gilze en Rijen, North Brabant, Netherlands
- Died: 27 March 1967 (aged 49)

Gerardus de Vet (born 15 November 1917, Gilze – 12 March 1967) was a Dutch clergyman and bishop for the Roman Catholic Diocese of Breda. He was ordained in 1943. He was appointed in 1962. He died in 1967.
