= Melissant =

- Village
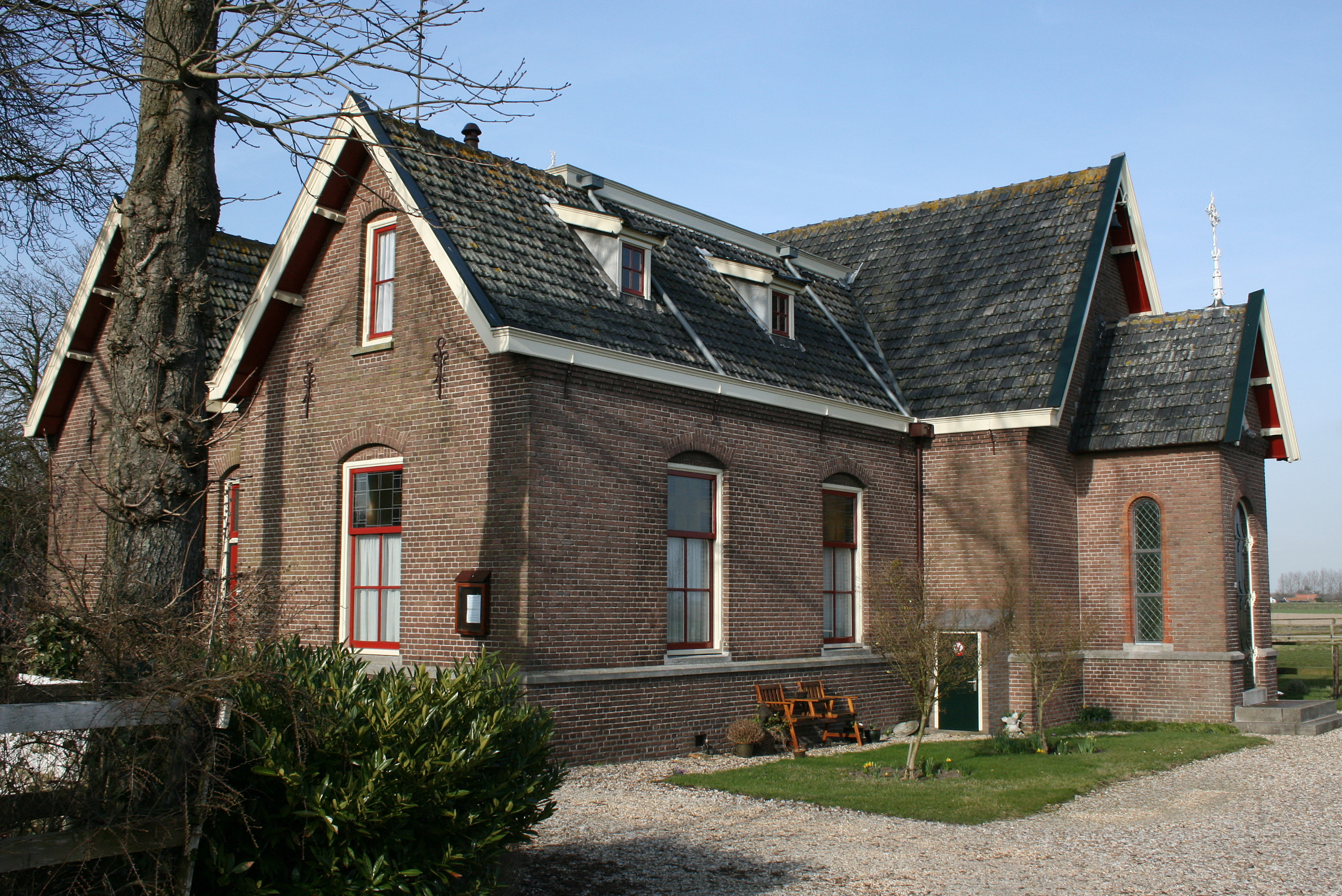
- St Josef Chapel

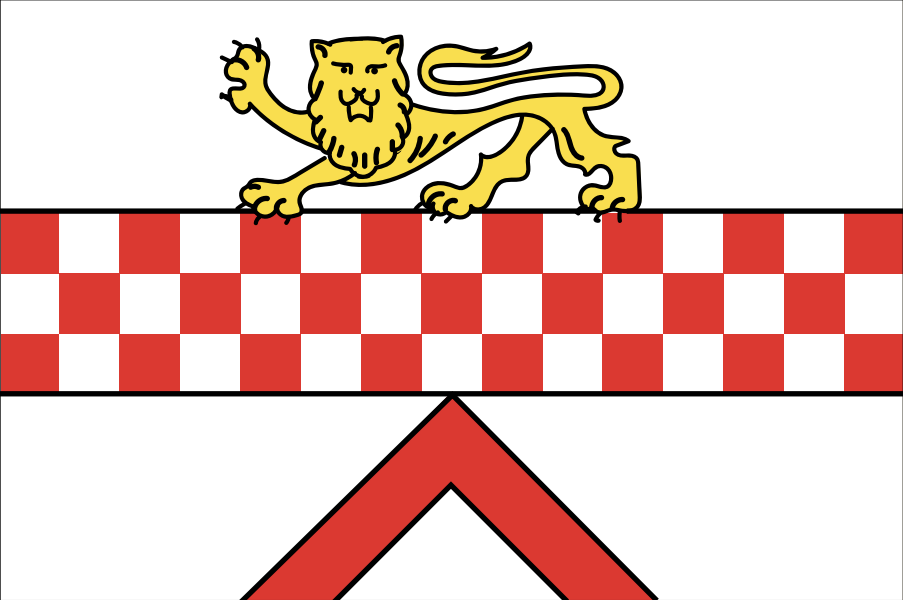
- Flag Coat of arms

- Location in the province of South Holland in the Netherlands Location in the Netherlands
- Coordinates: 51°46′5″N 4°4′34″E
- Country: Netherlands
- Province: South Holland
- Municipality: Goeree-Overflakkee

Area
  - Total: 16.34 km^{2} (6.31 sq mi)
- Elevation: 0.9 m (3.0 ft)

Population (2021)
  - Total: 2,175
  - Density: 133.1/km^{2} (344.8/sq mi)
- Time zone: UTC+1 (CET)
  - Summer (DST): UTC+2 (CEST)
- Postal code: 3248
- Dialing code: 0187

Melissant is a village in the Dutch province of South Holland. It is located on the island Goeree-Overflakkee, in the municipality of Goeree-Overflakkee.

== History ==
The village was first mentioned in 1484 as melissant, and means "sand (shoal) of Melis (person)". Melissant developed after the Oud-Melissant polder was enclosed by a dike in 1480.

The Restored Reformed Church is an aisleless church built between 1862 and 1863 in neoclassic style. It was originally a Dutch Reformed Church, but in 2004, during the merger into the Protestant church, the church was given to the Restored Reformed Church for 50 years in emphyteusis. The Catholic St Joseph Chapel was built in 1900 in Gothic Revival style. It was a bequest of Diert van Melissant to build a church, however the Roman Catholic Diocese of Rotterdam decided to build a chapel instead, due to the modest number of Catholics in the area.

Melissant was home to 664 people in 1840. It was a separate municipality from 1817 until 1966, when it became part of Dirksland. Subsequently, Dirksland became part of the new municipality of Goeree-Overflakkee in 2013.

== Gallery ==
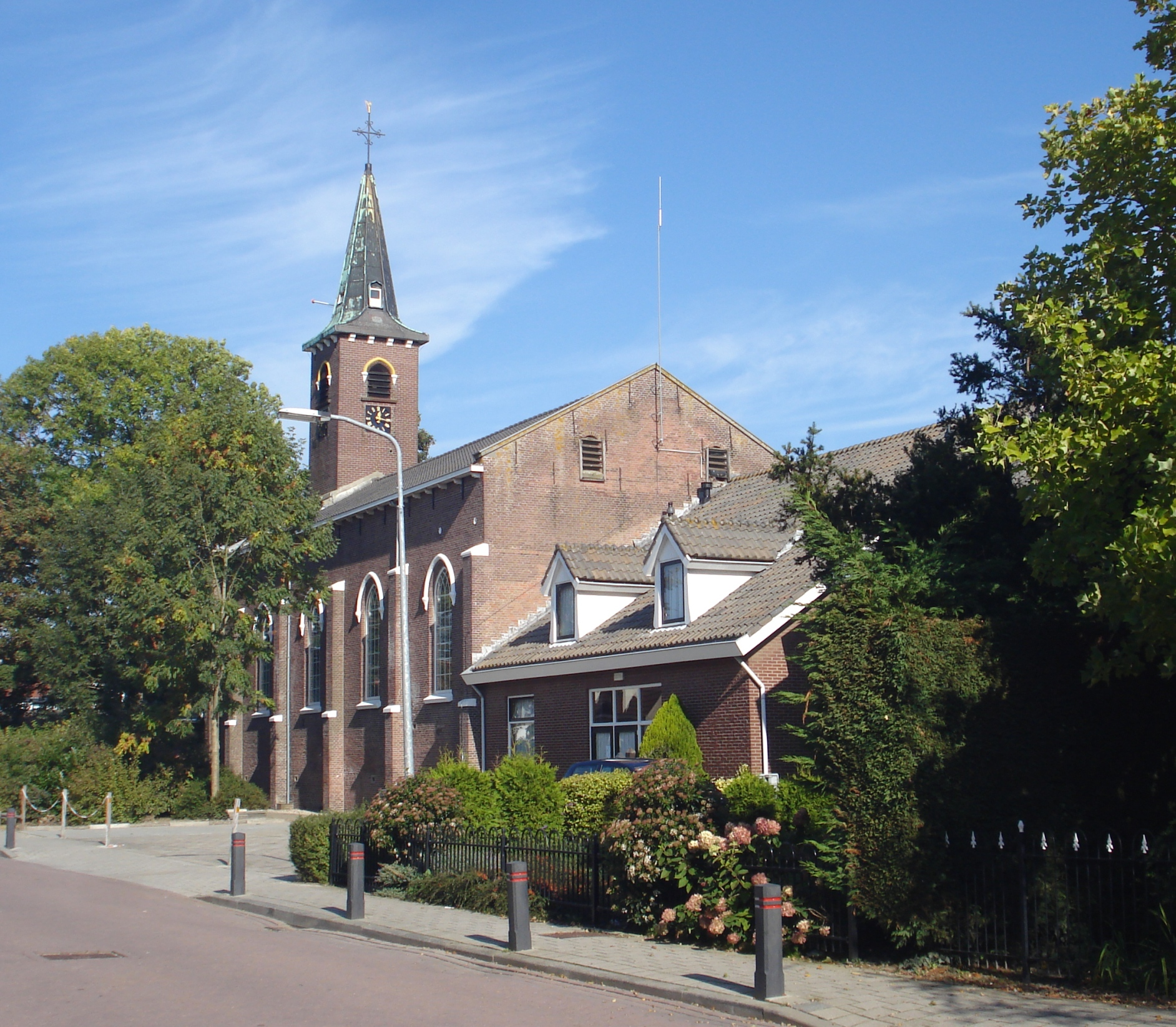
Restored Reformed Church

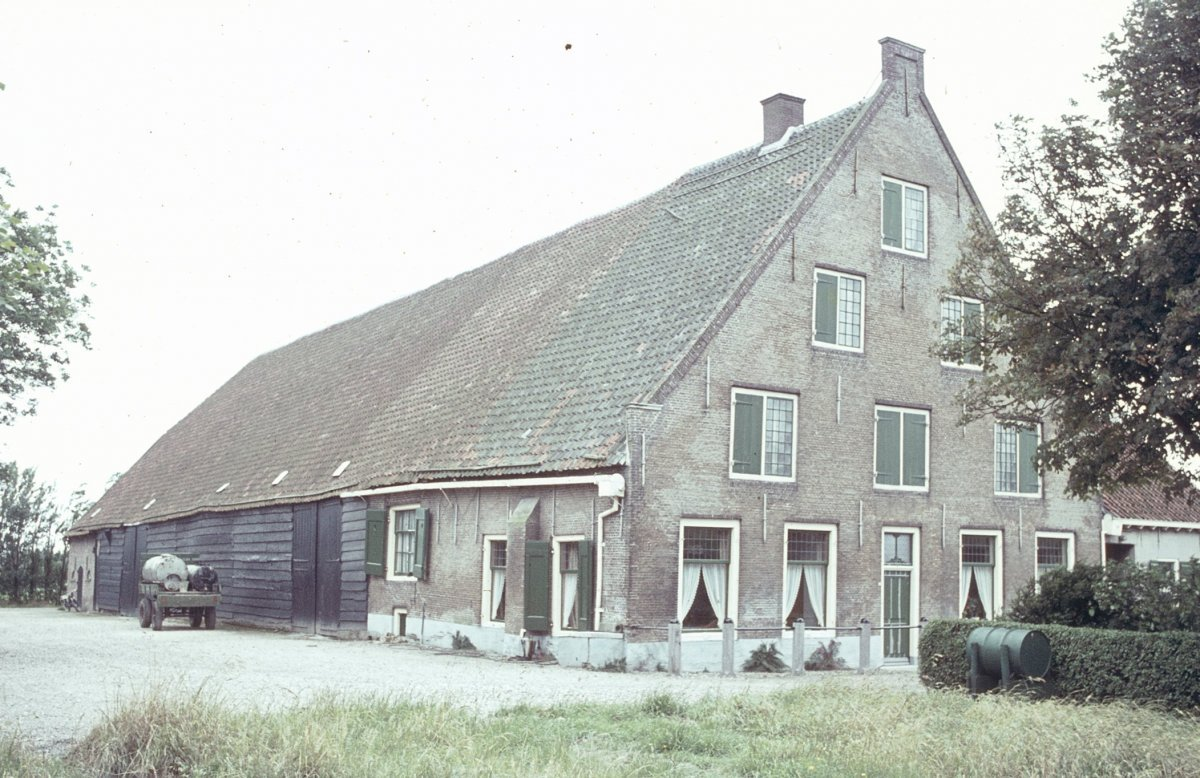
Farm in Melissant

== See also ==
- Onwaard
- Roxenisse
