= Petrus Leyten =

Dutch catholic bishop

- Bishop of Breda
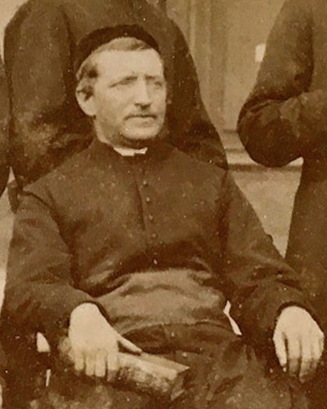
- Petrus Leyten in 1880, photographed by Jules David
- Church: Catholic Church
- Diocese: Diocese of Breda
- In office: 9 June 1885 – 17 May 1914
- Predecessor: Henricus van Beek
- Successor: Pieter Hopmans

Orders
- Ordination: 13 February 1859
- Consecration: 29 June 1885 by Petrus Matthias Snickers

Personal details
- Born: 16 July 1834 Ginneken, North Brabant, United Kingdom of the Netherlands
- Died: 17 May 1914 (aged 79)

Petrus Leyten (16 July 1834, Ginneken – 17 May 1914) was a Dutch clergyman and bishop for the Roman Catholic Diocese of Breda. He was ordained in 1859. He was appointed in 1885. He died in 1914.
