= Van Hooydonk =

Van Hooijdonk or van Hooydonk is a Dutch toponymic surname Hooijdonk/Hooydonk is an archaic spelling of "Hooidonk", a village between Nuenen and Son, North Brabant. Notable people with the surname include:

- Adrian van Hooydonk (born 1964), Dutch automobile designer
- Jeffrey van Hooydonk (born 1977), Belgian racing driver
- Johannes van Hooydonk (born 1782), Dutch clergyman
- Pierre van Hooijdonk (born 1969), Dutch footballer

== See also ==
- Van Hooydonck
