= Ginneken en Bavel =

Place in the Netherlands

Coordinates: 51°34′N 4°49′E

Ginneken en Bavel was a municipality in the Dutch province of North Brabant, located southeast of the city of Breda. It covered the villages of Ginneken (now a neighbourhood of Breda) and Bavel.

Ginneken en Bavel existed until 1942, when the village of Ginneken was transferred to Breda, and the other part of the area became a new municipality called Nieuw-Ginneken.
