= Diocese of Rotterdam =

Roman Catholic diocese in the Netherlands

Diocese of Rotterdam Dioecesis Roterodamensis Bisdom Rotterdam

Catholic
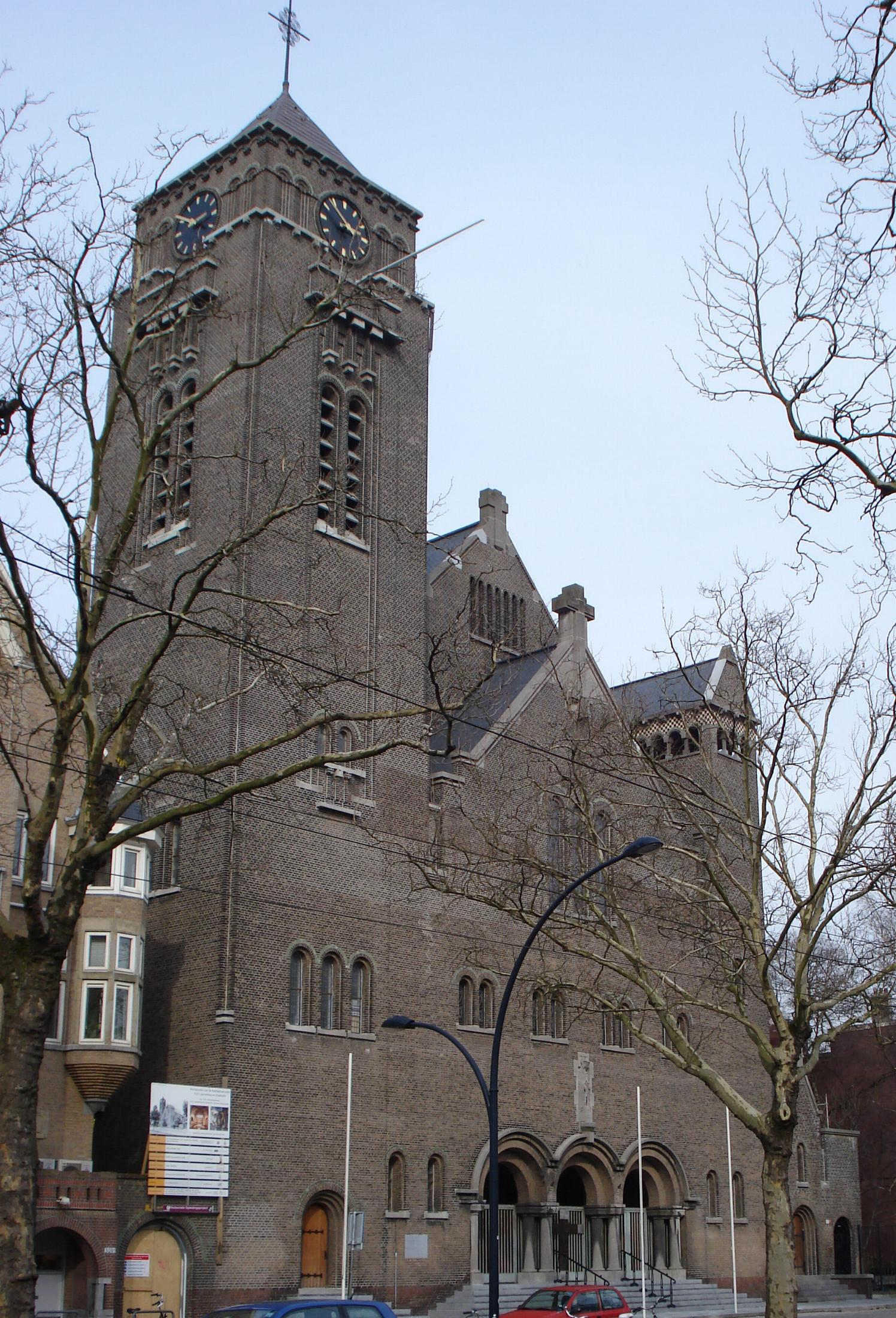
- Cathedral of St. Lawrence and St. Elizabeth in Rotterdam

- Coat of arms

- Flag

Location
- Country: Netherlands
- Territory: South Holland
- Ecclesiastical province: Utrecht
- Metropolitan: Archdiocese of Utrecht
- Deaneries: 3
- Coordinates: 51°55′51″N 4°28′45″E

Statistics
- Area: 8,326 km^{2} (3,215 sq mi)
- Population: Total; Catholics: (as of 2020); 3,798,000; 476,000 (12.5%)
- Parishes: 58

Information
- Denomination: Roman Catholic
- Rite: Latin Rite
- Cathedral: Cathedral of St. Lawrence and St. Elizabeth
- Patron saint: Saint Lawrence, Saint Elizabeth
- Secular priests: 153

Current leadership
- Pope: Leo XIV
- Bishop: Johannes Harmannes Jozefus van den Hende
- Metropolitan Archbishop: Cardinal Wim Eijk
- Vicar General: Dick Verbakel
- Bishops emeritus: Adrianus Herman van Luyn, Bishop Emeritus (1993-2011)

Map
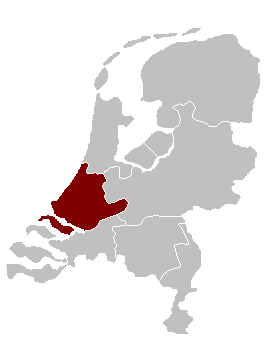
- Location of the Diocese of Rotterdam in the Netherlands

Website
- BisdomRotterdam.nl

The Diocese of Rotterdam (Latin: Dioecesis Roterodamensis) is a Latin diocese of the Catholic Church in South Holland province of the Netherlands. The diocese is a suffragan in the ecclesiastical province of the Metropolitan Archbishop of Utrecht. Since 2011, the bishop has been Hans van den Hende.

The cathedral ecclesiastical see is the Kathedrale Kerk van de HH Laurentius en Elisabeth, dedicated to Saints Lawrence and Elisabeth, in Rotterdam. The only minor basilica is Basiliek van de H. Liduina en Onze Lieve Vrouw van de Rozenkrans, dedicated to St. Liduina and Our Lady of the Rosary, in Schiedam.

== History ==
It was erected on July 16, 1955, on territory from the split off from the Diocese of Haarlem, from which at the same time the Diocese of Groningen was also split off.

It enjoyed a papal visit from Pope John Paul II in May 1985.

== Statistics ==
As per 2014, it pastorally served 531,600 Catholics (14.5% of 3,655,000 total, mainly protestants and atheists) on 3,403 km^{2} in 75 parishes, with 358 priests (110 diocesan, 248 religious), 34 deacons, 452 lay religious (289 brothers, 163 sisters) and 6 seminarians.

== Ordinaries ==
(all Roman Rite)

Suffragan bishops of Rotterdam

- Martien Jansen (10 March 1956 – 2 January 1970), emeritate as titular bishop of Basti (2 January 1970 – death 29 November 1970)
- Adrianus Johannes Simonis (29 December 1970 – 27 June 1983), later president of Episcopal Conference of the Netherlands (1983 – 26 January 2008), coadjutor archbishop of Utrecht (Netherlands) (27 June 1983 – 3 December 1983) succeeding as Metropolitan Archbishop of Utrecht (3 December 1983 – retired 14 April 2007), created cardinal-priest of S. Clemente (25 May 1985 – ...), acting as Apostolic Administrator of Utrecht (Netherlands) (14 April 2007 – retired 11 December 2007)
- Ronald Philippe Bär, Benedictine Order (O.S.B.) (19 October 1983 – 13 March 1993), succeeding as previous auxiliary bishop of Rotterdam (15 January 1982 – 19 October 1983) and titular bishop of Leges (15 January 1982 – 19 October 1983); concurrently last military vicar of Netherlands (22 November 1982 – 21 July 1986), promoted first military ordinary of Netherlands (21 July 1986 – retired 13 March 1993)
- Adrianus van Luyn, Salesians (S.D.B.) (27 November 1993 – 14 January 2011), concurrently vice-president of Council of European Bishops’ Conferences (2000 – 2006.03) promoted to president of Council of European Bishops’ Conferences (2006.03 – 14 January 2011) and president of Episcopal Conference of the Netherlands (26 January 2008 – 14 January 2011); stayed on as Apostolic Administrator of Rotterdam (14 January 2011 – 10 May 2011)
- Hans van den Hende (10 May 2011 – ...), concurrently president of Episcopal Conference of the Netherlands (14 June 2016 – ...); previously coadjutor bishop of Breda (Netherlands) (9 September 2006 – 31 October 2007) succeeded as Bishop of Breda (31 October 2007 – 10 May 2011)

== List of churches ==
=== Partial list of historical church buildings ===
1. Cathedral of Saints Laurentius and Elisabeth, Rotterdam
2. Saint Hippolytus Chapel, Delft
3. Saint Maria of Jesse, Delft

=== Deanery of The Hague ===
The official website of the diocese shows the Catholic communities organized in two vicariates (also known as deaneries). The two deaneries are further organized into subgroups of parishes, federations and clusters. The Hague Vicariate has the following parishes, federations or clusters:

1. Parish of Saint Augustine (Parochie H. Augustinus), Katwijk aan den Rijn, Oegstgeest, Voorschoten, Wassenaar
2. Parish of Saint Barnabas (Parochie St. Barnabas), Haastrecht
3. Parish of Saint Bartholomew (Parochie H. Bartholomeus), Schoonhoven
4. Parish of Saint John the Baptist (Parochie St. Jan de Doper), Bodegraven, Boskoop, Gouda, Moordrecht, Reeuwijk, Waddinxveen
5. Parish of Saint Martin (Parochie Sint Maarten), Noordwijk, Noordwijkerhout, Sassenheim/Warmond, Voorhout
6. Parish of Saint Nicholas (Parochie H. Nicolaas), Zoetermeer
7. Parish of Peace of Christ (Parochie Pax Christi), Kamerik, Meije en Zegveld, Oudewater, Woerden, (including the work area of Saint Gabriel in Haastrecht)
8. Parish of Saints Peter and Paul (Parochie HH Petrus en Paulus), Leiden, Leiderdorp, Zoeterwoude-Rijndijk, Zoeterwoude-Dorp, Stompwijk
9. Vicariate of Merenwijk (Vicariaat De Merenwijk), Leiden
10. Parish of Saint Thomas (Parochie H. Thomas), Alphen aan den Rijn, Hazerswoude-Dorp, Hazerswoude-Rijndijk
11. Parish of The Four Evangelists (Parochie De Vier Evangelisten), The Hague
12. Parish of Saint Willibrord (Parochie H. Willibrordus), De Zilk, Hillegom, Lisse

=== Federation of Saints Clare and Francis (Federatie HH. Clara en Franciscus) ===
1. Parish of Saint Clare of Assisi (Parochie Heilige Clara), Aarlanderveen, Langeraar, Nieuwkoop, Nieuwvee, Noorden, Zevenhoven
2. Parish of Saint Francis of Assisi (Parochie Heilige Franciscus), Hoogmade/Woubrugge, Leimuiden, Oude Wetering, Oud Ade/Rijpwetering

=== Cluster of The Hague North (Cluster Den Haag Noord) ===
1. Parish of Saint Agnes (Parochie H. Agnes), The Hague
2. Parish of Saint Anthony the Abbot (Parochie H. Antonius Abt), The Hague
3. Parish of Saint Anthony of Padua (Parochie H. Antonius van Padua), The Hague
4. Parish of The Holy Three Kings (Parochie H. Driekoningen), The Hague
5. Parish of Saint Ignatius of Loyola (Parochie H. Ignatius van Loyola), The Hague
6. Parish of Saint James the Greater (Parochie H. Jacobus de Meerdere), The Hague
7. Parish of Saint Willibrord (Parochie H. Willibrordus), The Hague

=== Cluster Vlietstreek ===
1. Parish of The Holy Trinity (Parochie Trinitas), Leidschendam
2. Parish of Saint Boniface (Parochie H. Bonifatius), Rijswijk
3. Parish of the Risen Christ (Parochie De Verrezen Christus), Voorburg
4. Parish of Saint Martin (Parochie St. Maarten), Voorburg

=== Deanery of Rotterdam ===
The deanery has the following parishes, federation and clusters:

1. Parish of the Good Shepherd (Parochie De Goede Herder), Maassluis, Schiedam, Vlaardingen
2. Parish of Saints Michael and Clement (Parochie H.H. Michaël en Clemens), Rotterdam
3. Parish of Saint Nicholas Pieck and Companions (Parochie H. Nicolaas Pieck en Gezellen), Brielle, Hellevoetsluis, Rhoon, Rotterdam-Hooglviet, Rozenburg, Spijkenisse
4. Parish of Saint Theresa of Avila (Parochie H. Theresia van Avila), H.I. AMbacht/Zwijndrecht, Dordrecht, Alblasserdam/Papendrecht/Sliedrecht
5. Parish of Our Lady of Sion (Parochie O.L. Vrouw van Sion), Den Hoorn, Maasland, Schipluiden
6. Parish of Saint Ursula (Parochie St. Ursula), Delft
7. Parish of the Holy Family (Parochie De Heilige Familie), Achthuizen, Middelharnis, Oud Beijerland, Oude Tonge, Puttershoek

==== Federation Driestromenland (Federatie Driestromenland) ====
1. Parish of the Trinity (Parochie Heilige Drie-eenheid), Everdingen/Leerdam/Vianen
2. Parish of the Holy Martyrs of Gorcum (Parochie H.H. Martelaren van Gorcum), Arkel/Gorinchem/Hardinxveld-Giessendam

=== Federatie IPV-5 ===
1. Parish of Saint Paul Conversion (Parochie St. Paulus Bekering), Capelle aan den IJssel
2. Parish of Mary, Queen (Parochie Maria Koningin), Krimpen aan den IJssel
3. Parish of Saint Joseph (Parochie St. Joseph), Nieuwerkerk aan den IJssel
4. Parish of Saint Cecelia (Parochie St. Caecilia), Rotterdam-Alexander
5. Vicariaat Ommoord-Zevenkamp, Rotterdam-Ommoord

=== Federatie H. Maria Magdalena ===
1. Parish of Saint Augustine (Parochie St. Augustinus), Barendrecht
2. Parish of Saint George (Parochie St. Joris), Ridderkerk
3. Parish of Emmaus (Parochie De Emmausgangers), Rotterdam
4. Parish of the Trinity (Parochie H. Drie Eenheid), Rotterdam
5. Parish of Our Lady of Lourdes (Parochie OLV van Lourdes), Rotterdam

=== Federation of Oostland (Federatie Oostland) ===
1. Parish of Saint Willibrord (Parochie St. Willibrord), Bergschenhoek
2. Parish of The Nativity of Mary (Parochie O.L. Vrouw Geboorte), Berkel en Rodenrijs
3. Parish of Our Lady's Visitation (Parochie O.L. Vrouw Visitatie), Bleiswijk
4. Parish of Saint Bartholomew (Parochie H. Bartholomeus), Nootdorp
5. Parish of Saint John the Baptist (Parochie H. Joannes de Dooper), Pijnacker

=== Federatie St. Franciscus, tussen duin en tuin (Westland (municipality), Netherlands) ===
1. Parish of the Holy Martyrs of Gorcum (Parochie HH. Martelaren van Gorcum), De Lier
2. Parish of Our Lady's Assumption into Heaven (Parochie OLV ten Hemelopneming), 's-Gravenzande
3. Parish of Saint Egbert and Lambert (Parochie H. Egbertus / H. Lambertus), Hook of Holland
4. Parish of Our Lady of Good Counsel (Parochie OLV van Goeden Raad), Honselersdijk
5. Parish of Saint Andrew (Parochie H. Andreas), Kwintsheul
6. Community of Saint James (Geloofsgemeenschap H. Jacobus), Maasdijk
7. Parish of Saint Malo of Brittany (Parochie H. Machutus), Monster, South Holland
8. Parish of Saint Adrian (Parochie St. Adrianus), Naaldwijk
9. Parish of Saint Bartholomew (Parochie H. Bartholomeus), Poeldijk
10. Parish of Saint John the Baptist (Parochie St. Jan de Doper), Wateringen
11. Parish of Saint Joseph (Parochie St. Joseph), Wateringen

=== Federatie Rotterdam Rechter Maasoever ===
1. Parish of Saint Lambert (Parochie H. Lambertus), Rotterdam
2. Cathedral Parish of Saints Lawrence and Elisabeth (Parochie H.H. Laurentius & Elisabeth), Rotterdam
3. Parish of Saints Lawrence and Ignatius (Parochie H.H. Laurentius & Ignatius), Rotterdam
4. Parish of the Peace of Christ (Parochie Pax Christi), Rotterdam
5. Parish of Saint Dominic (Parochie H. Dominicus), Rotterdam
6. Parish of Saints Francis and Clare (Parochie H.H. Franciscus en Clara), Rotterdam
7. Parish of Saint Joseph (Parochie H. Joseph), Rotterdam
8. Parish of Our Lady of the Holy Rosary and Saint Albert (Parochie OLV Rozenkrans en H. Albertus), Rotterdam
9. Parish of Saint Nicholas (Parochie H. Nicolaas), Rotterdam
10. Parish of the Four Evangelists (Parochie De Vier Evangelisten), Rotterdam

== See also ==
- Catholic Church in the Netherlands
- Provenierskerk
- Dutch pages about the many church buildings in the Diocese of Rotterdam
