= Martinus Petrus Maria Muskens =

Former Roman Catholic bishop

His Excellency Martinus Muskens
- Bishop of Breda
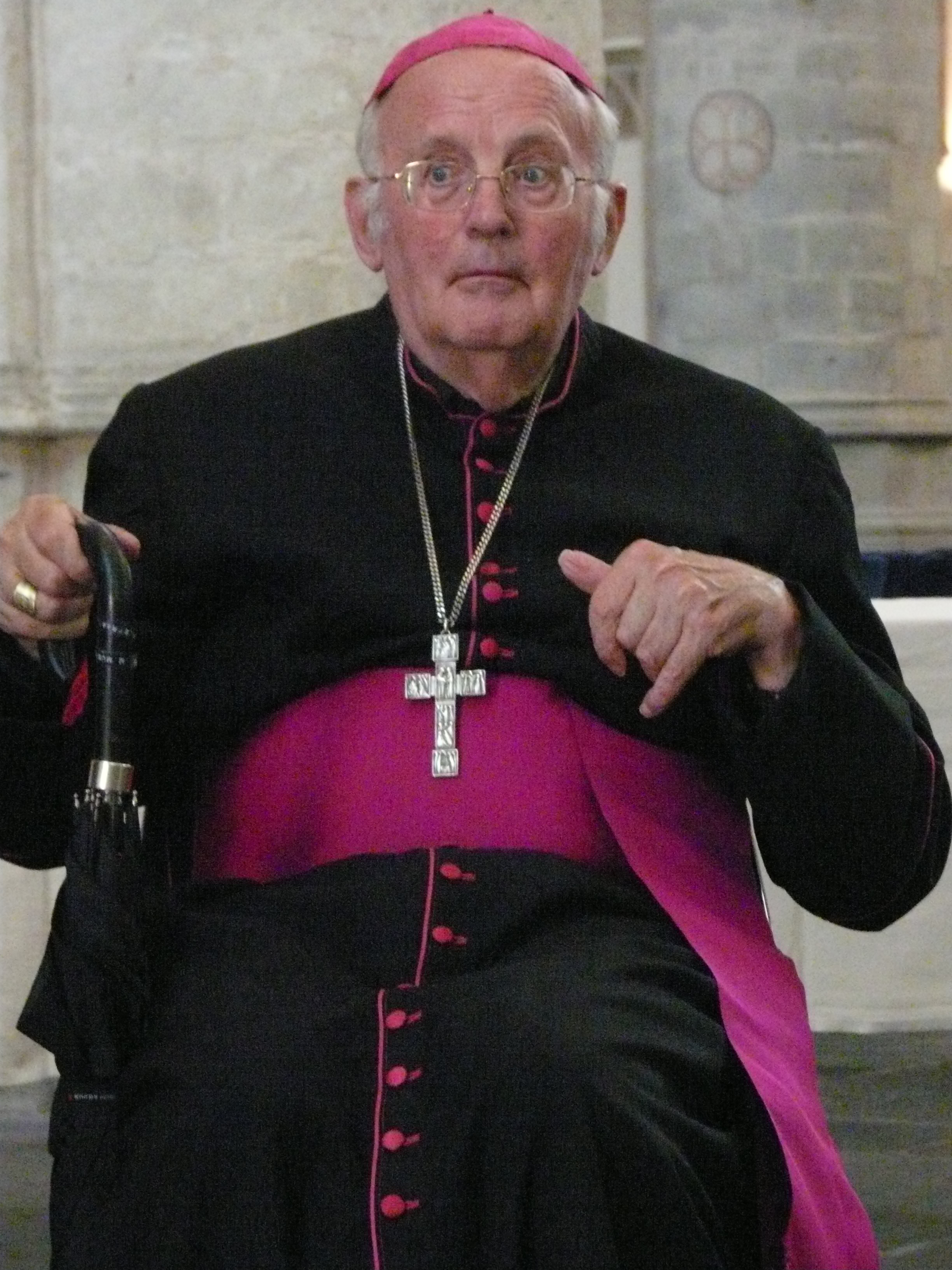
- Martinus Petrus Maria Muskens (after his stroke), 2009
- Church: Catholic Church
- Diocese: Diocese of Breda
- Appointed: 23 luglio 1994
- Installed: 26 November 1994
- Term ended: 31 October 2007
- Predecessor: Hubertus Ernst
- Successor: Hans van den Hende

Orders
- Ordination: 16 June 1962 by Wilhelmus Marinus Bekkers
- Consecration: 26 November 1994 by Hubertus Ernst

Personal details
- Born: 11 December 1935
- Died: 17 April 2013 (aged 77)

Martinus Petrus Maria Muskens (December 11, 1935 – April 17, 2013) was the Roman Catholic bishop of the Diocese of Breda, Netherlands.

Ordained to the priesthood in 1962, Muskens was named bishop in 1994 and resigned in 2007.
