= Roxenisse =

Former municipality in South Holland

Coordinates: 51°46′20″N 4°2′50″E

Roxenisse is a former municipality in the Dutch province of South Holland. It consisted of a single polder to the west of the village of Melissant.

The municipality was formed in 1817 and only existed until 1857, when it became part of Melissant.
