= Henricus van Beek =

Dutch catholic bishop

- Bishop of Breda
- Church: Catholic Church
- Diocese: Diocese of Breda
- In office: 19 June 1874 – 15 October 1884
- Predecessor: Johannes van Genk
- Successor: Petrus Leyten

Orders
- Ordination: 18 October 1842 by Cornelius Ludovicus de Wijkerslooth
- Consecration: 2 August 1874 by Gerardus Petrus Wilmer

Personal details
- Born: 24 March 1816 Amsterdam, United Kingdom of the Netherlands
- Died: 15 October 1884 (aged 68)

Henricus van Beek (born 24 Mar 1816 in Amsterdam) was a Dutch clergyman and bishop for the Roman Catholic Diocese of Breda. He was ordained in 1842. He was appointed in 1874. He died in 1884.
