= Ginneken =

Coordinates: 51°34′05″N 4°47′14″E

- Neighbourhood
- Coat of arms
- Nickname: 't Ginneke
- Motto: W'ebbe ginne sluiting mir
- Interactive map of Ginneken
- Location within Netherlands
- Country: Netherlands
- Province: North Brabant
- Municipality: Breda

Area
  - Total: 1.36 km^{2} (0.53 sq mi)
  - Land: 1.34 km^{2} (0.52 sq mi)
  - Water: 0.01 km^{2} (0.0039 sq mi)

Population (2025)https://www.cbs.nl/nl-nl/cijfers/detail/86165NED?q=ginneken
  - Total: 5,430
  - Density: 4,050/km^{2} (10,500/sq mi)
- Demonym: Ginnekenaar
- Time zone: UTC+1
  - Summer (DST): UTC+2
- Postal code: 4835
- Area code: 076

Ginneken was a former village and municipality until 1942 and now a neighbourhood in the city Breda, Netherlands.

== History ==
Ginneken started as a small settlement near the river Mark. The name Ginneken means Dominion of Gimmos, Ginn meaning Gimmos and -eken means -iacum, which means Dominion of. In 1317 it became its own parish, after splitting off from Gilze. During the Napoleonic rule over the Netherlands, Ginneken became a municipality. In 1814 it united with the municipality Bavel to become Ginneken en Bavel. In 1942, Ginneken got transferred to Breda and the rest of Ginneken en Bavel turned into Nieuw-Ginneken.

== Demographics ==
There are 5,430 residents in Ginneken living in 2.485 households.

The age group of Ginneken is:

Population by age group in Ginneken
Age	Percentage	Amount
0-14 years	16%	869
15-24 years	11%	597
25-44 years	21%	1140
45-64 years	29%	1575
65 years or above	23%	1249

91,6% of people living in Ginneken are born in the Netherlands, 8,4% is born outside of the Netherlands.

== Education ==
Ginneken has 3 elementary schools. 2 of them are named Dr. de Visserschool (on the Burgemeester Serrarislaan and the Viandenlaan) and K.B.S Laurentius. KBS Laurentius has 1 location for Groep 1 to Groep 3 (Kindergarten to first grade) and 1 location for Groep 4 to Groep 8 (2nd grade to 6th grade).

== Other facilities ==
There is a community center named Vianden. At the Ginnekenweg, there are many pubs and at the Valkeniersplein there are also several stores.
