= Ulvenhout =

- Village
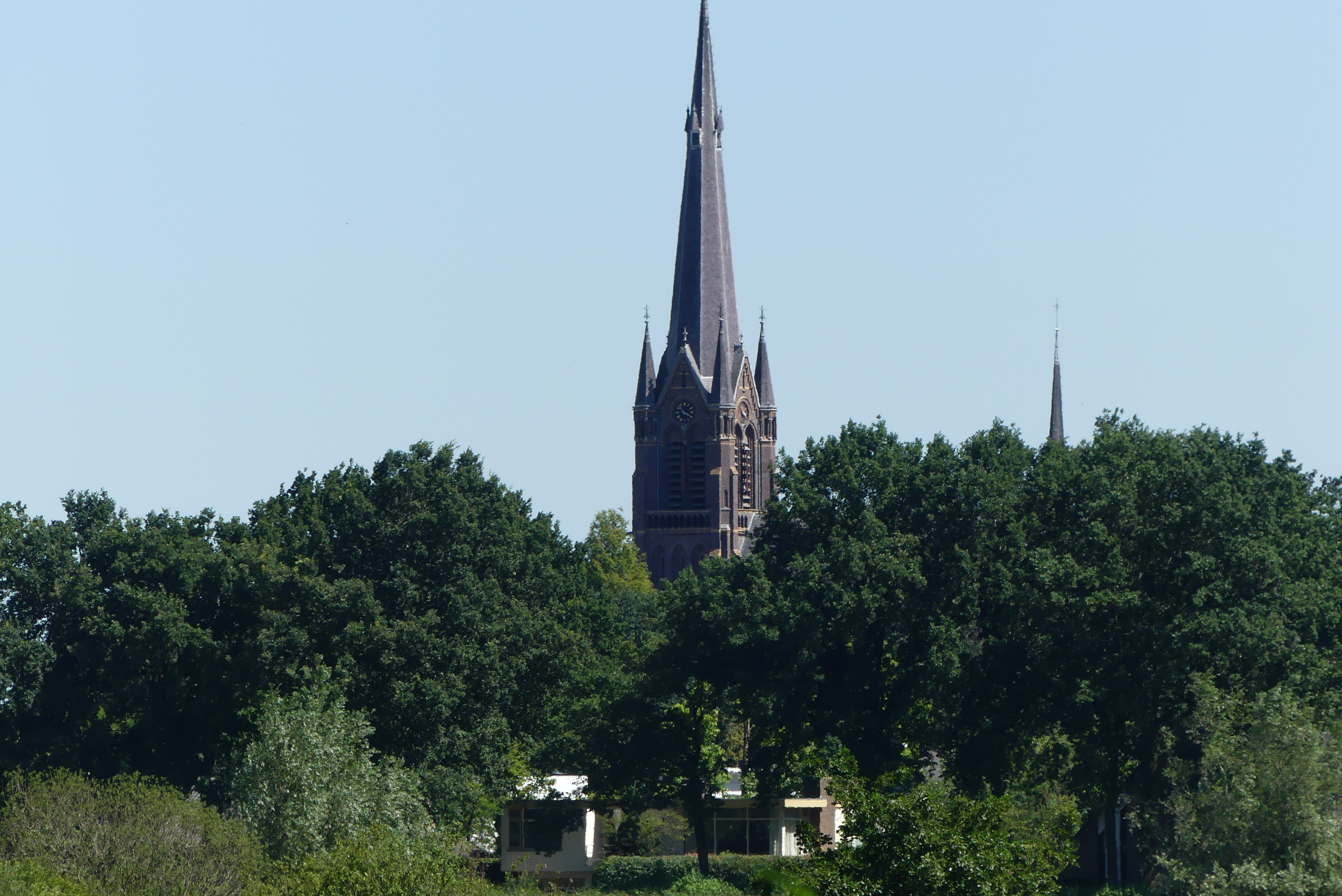
- St Laurentius Church

- Flag Coat of arms

- Location within North Brabant Location within Netherlands
- Coordinates: 51°33′N 4°48′E
- Country: Netherlands
- Province: North Brabant
- Municipality: Breda; Alphen-Chaam

Area
  - Total: 12.45 km^{2} (4.81 sq mi)
- Elevation: 5 m (16 ft)

Population (2021)
  - Total: 5,220
  - Density: 419/km^{2} (1,090/sq mi)
- Time zone: UTC+1 (CET)
  - Summer (DST): UTC+2 (CEST)
- Postal code: 4851 & 4858
- Dialing code: 076

Ulvenhout is a village in the Dutch province of North Brabant. It is located in the municipality of Breda. The village was divided by the A58 motorway. The southern part belongs to the municipality of Alphen-Chaam and is called Ulvenhout AC.

== History ==
The village was first mentioned in 1274 as "Ulvenholti". The "hout" part means a deciduous forest. "Ulven" is suspected to be an extinct word for species of tree. Ulvenhout was an agrarian settlement which started to develop in the 19th century along the Breda - Hoogstraten road.

The Roman Catholic St Lawrence Church was built in 1903 and 1904 in Gothic Revival style. The tall tower has a constricted spire with corner turrets. It forms a collection with the nearby clergy house, a school, a 17th-century gate post and a house near the church which belonged to the Buitenplaats' summer residence of Justinus van Nassau, the governor of Breda.

Ulvenhout was home to 266 people in 1840. In 1942, it became a part of the municipality of Nieuw-Ginneken. In 1997, it was merged into Breda except for the part of the village south of the A58 which was transferred to the municipality of Alphen-Chaam.

== Gallery ==
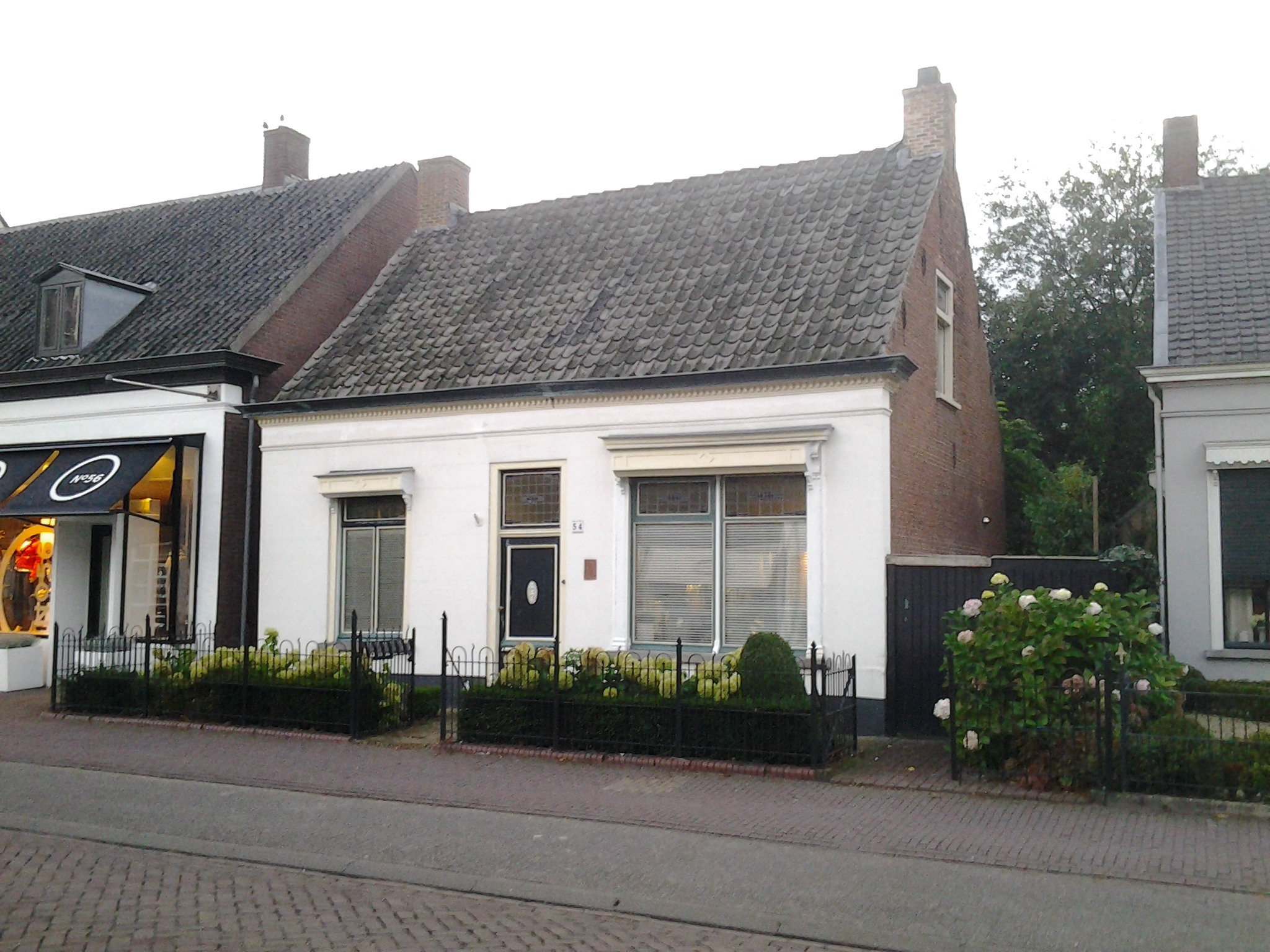
Former shoemaker

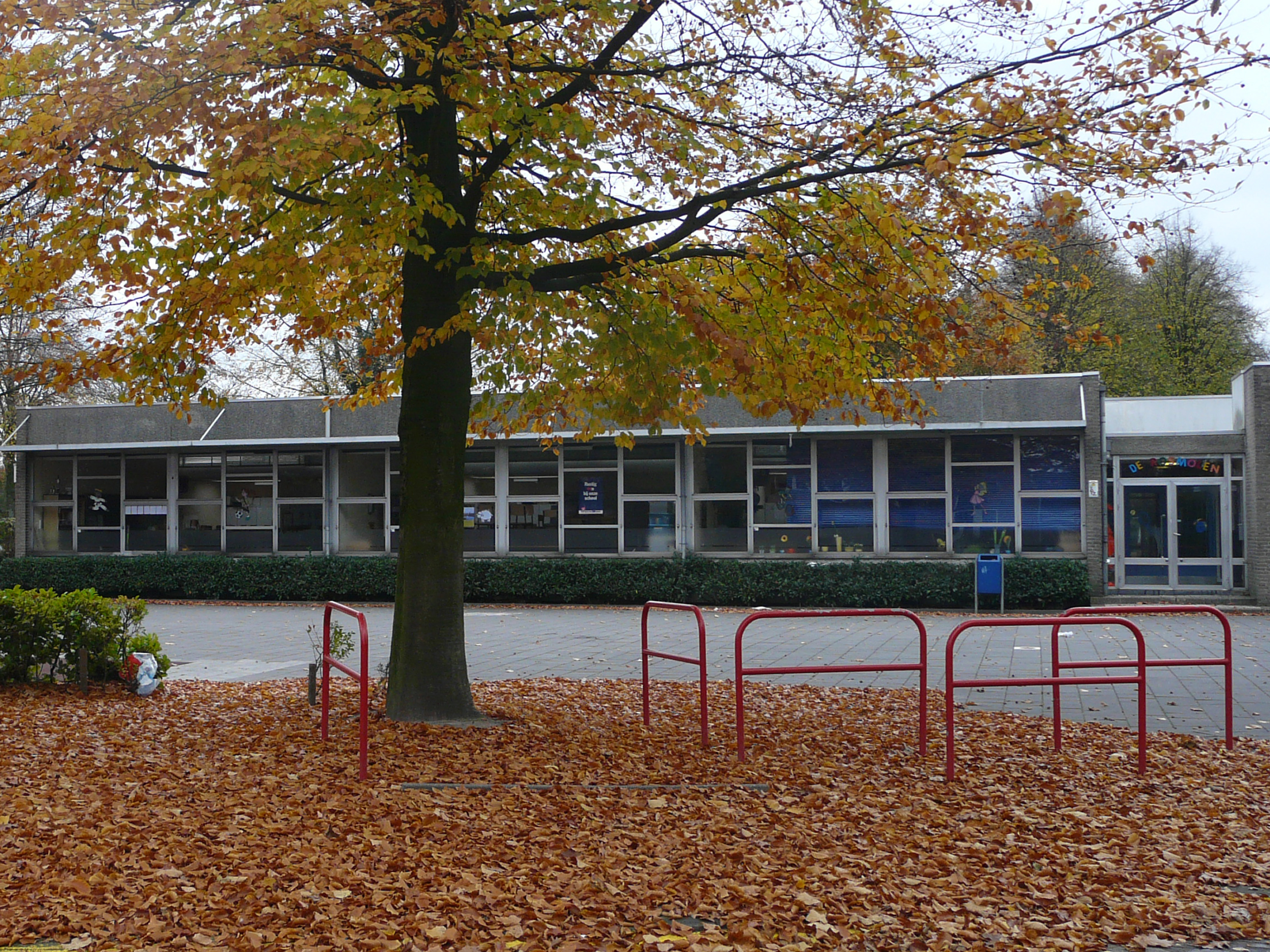
School

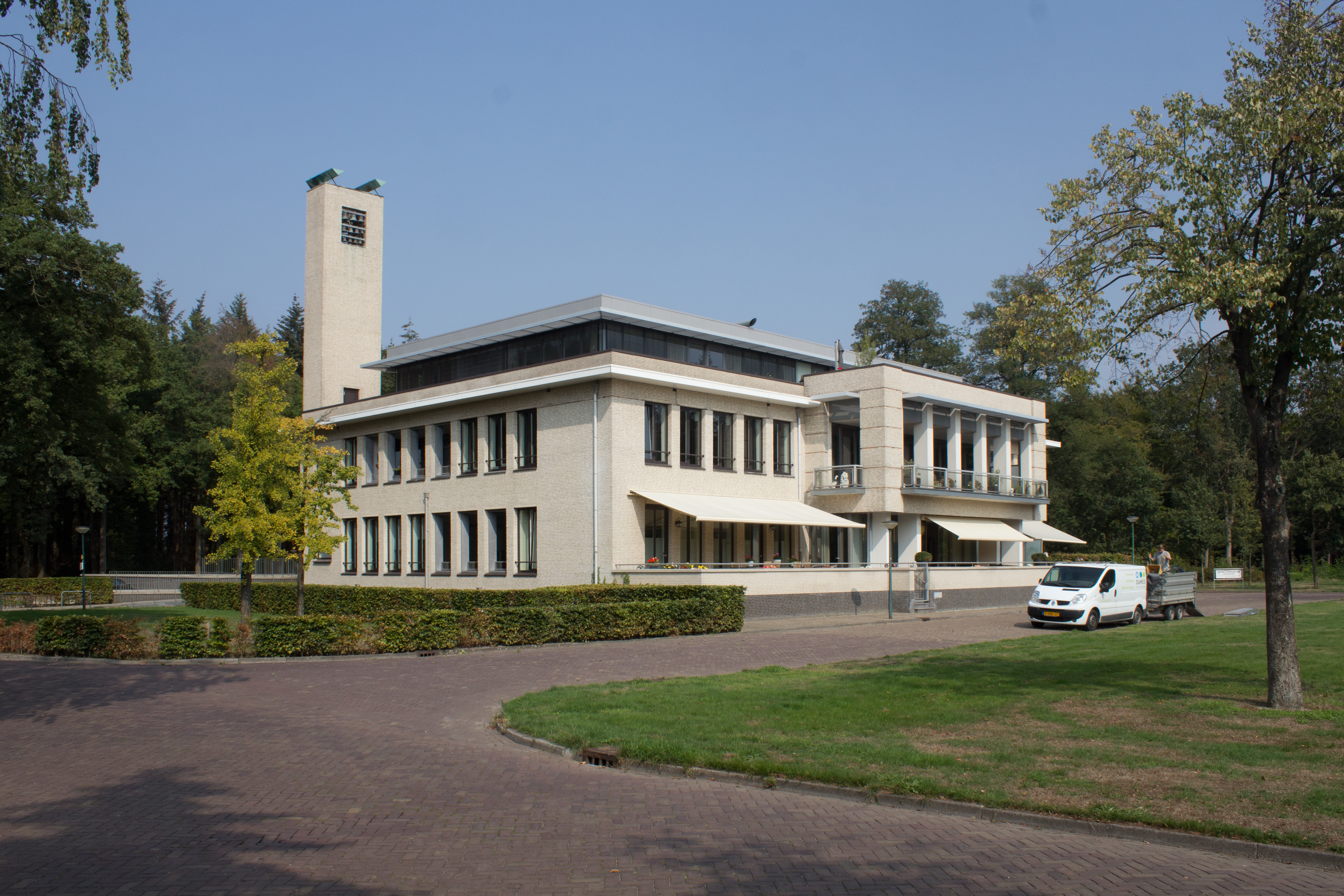
Former town hall

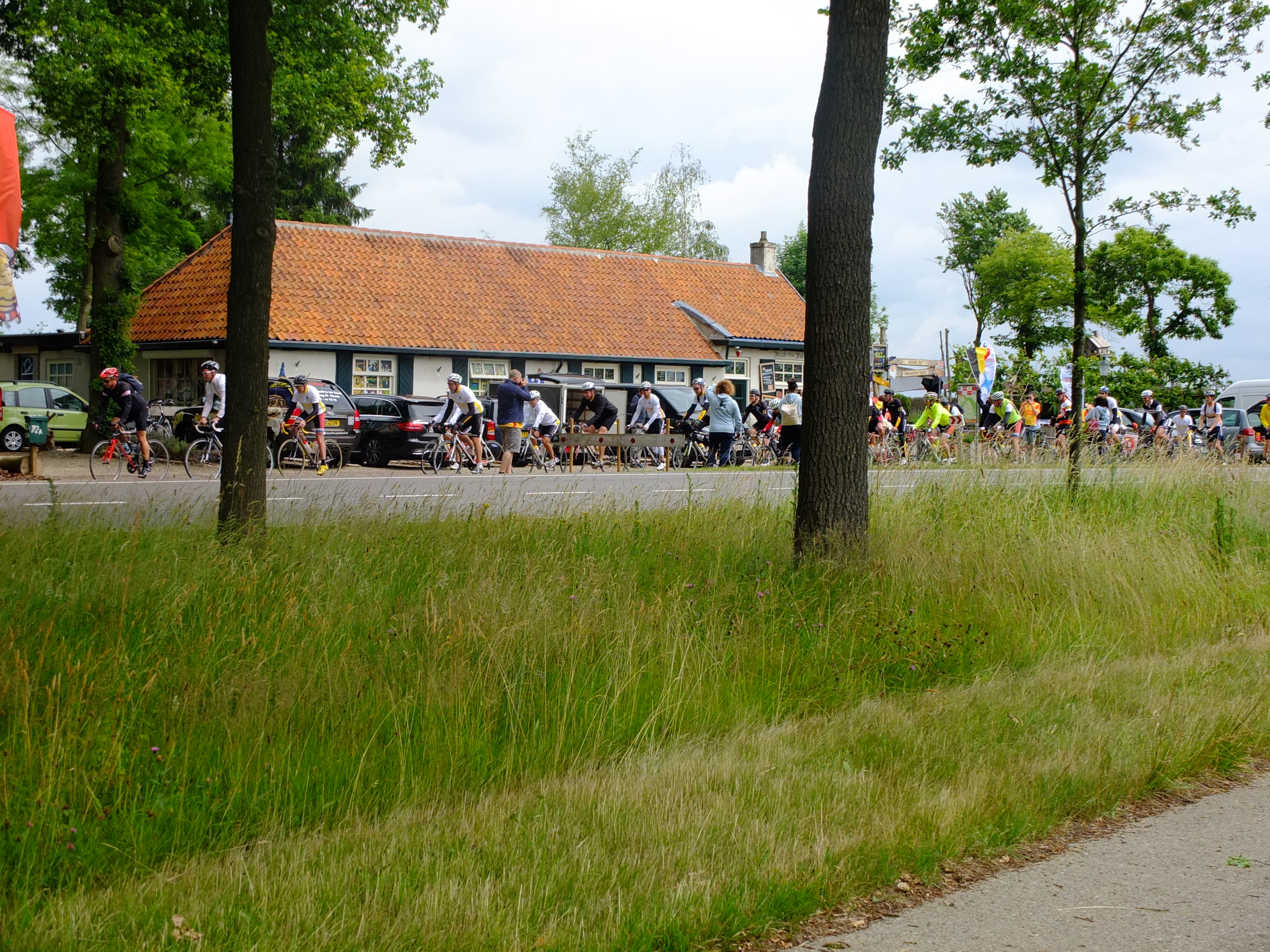
Pancake house with cyclists
