= Johannes van Genk =

Dutch catholic bishop

- Bishop of Breda
- Native name: Joannes van Genk
- Church: Catholic Church
- Diocese: Diocese of Breda
- In office: 25 April 1868 – 10 March 1874
- Predecessor: Johannes van Hooydonk
- Successor: Henricus van Beek
- Previous posts: Coadjutor Bishop of Breda (1853-1868); Titular Bishop of Adrana (1850-1868); Coadjutor Vicar Apostolic of Breda (1850-1853)

Orders
- Ordination: 20 February 1827
- Consecration: 1 May 1851 by Johannes van Hooydonk

Personal details
- Born: 9 September 1803 Haage, Deux-Nèthes, Batavian Commonwealth
- Died: 10 March 1874 (aged 70)

Johannes van Genk (born 9 Sep 1803 in Princenhage) was a Dutch clergyman and bishop for the Roman Catholic Diocese of Breda. He was ordained in 1827. He was appointed in 1868. He died in 1874.
