= Onwaard =

Coordinates: 51°45′45″N 4°6′45″E

Onwaard is a former municipality in the Dutch province of South Holland. It was located east of the village of Melissant on the island Goeree-Overflakkee. The municipality contained no villages nor hamlets; only a few farms. It consisted of a number of small polders: Onwaard, Oud-Kraaijer, Kraaijenisse, and part of the Nieuw-Kraaijer polder.

The municipality existed between 1817 and 1857, when it merged with Melissant. It had 170 inhabitants in the middle of the 19th century.
