= Diocese of Breda =

Roman Catholic diocese in the Netherlands

Coordinates: 51.5875°N 4.7774°E

Diocese of Breda Dioecesis Bredana Bisdom Breda

Catholic
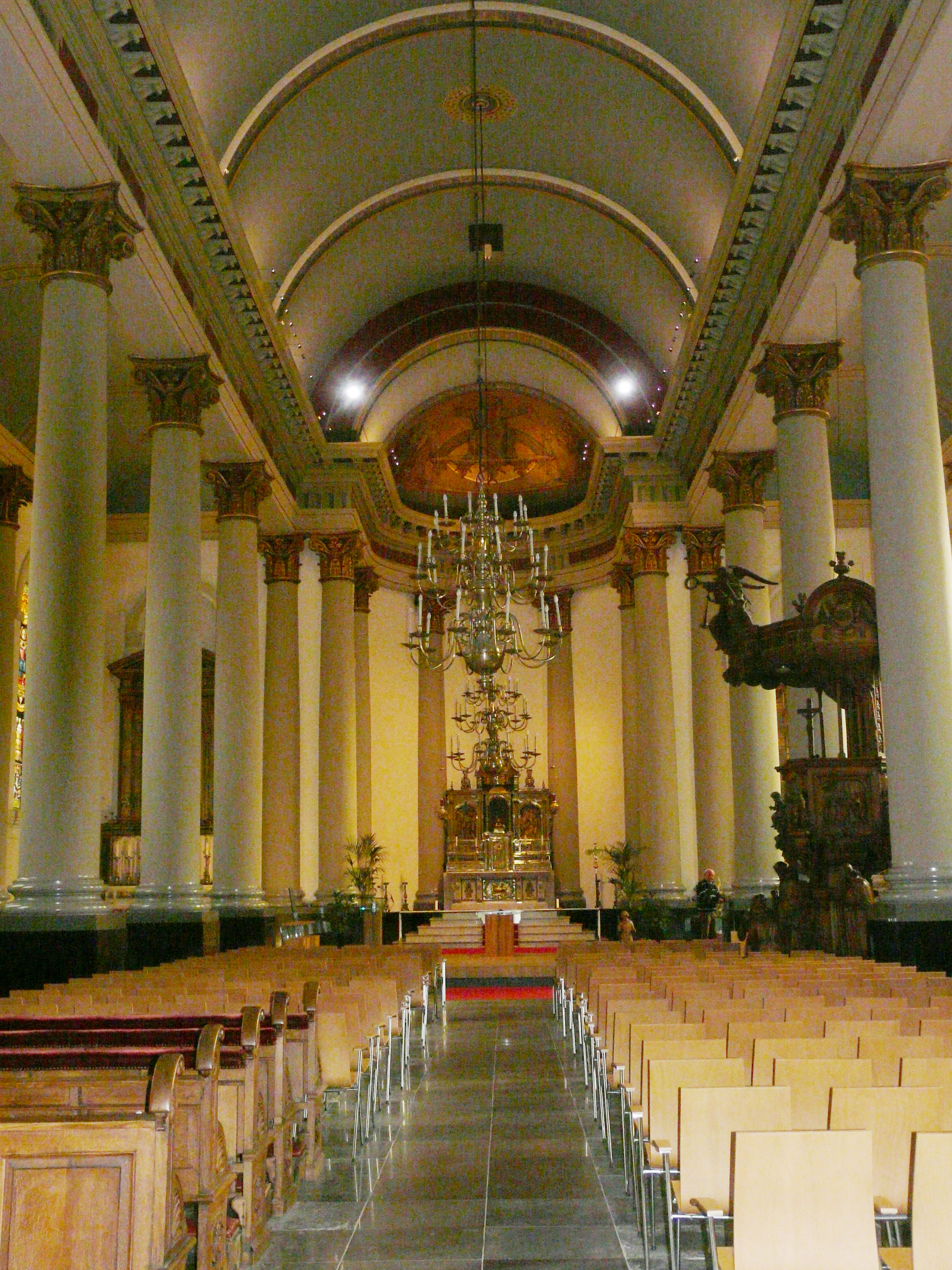
- Interior of Sint Antonius Cathedral

- Coat of arms

Location
- Country: Netherlands
- Ecclesiastical province: Utrecht
- Metropolitan: Archdiocese of Utrecht

Statistics
- Area: 3,368 km^{2} (1,300 sq mi)
- Population: Total; Catholics: (as of 2020); 1,149,000; 418,200 (36.4%)
- Parishes: 34
- Members: 25,000 (2.2%)

Information
- Denomination: Roman Catholic
- Rite: Latin Rite
- Cathedral: H. Antonius van Padua, Breda

Current leadership
- Pope: Leo XIV
- Bishop: Johannes Wilhelmus Maria Liesen
- Metropolitan Archbishop: Cardinal Wim Eijk

Map
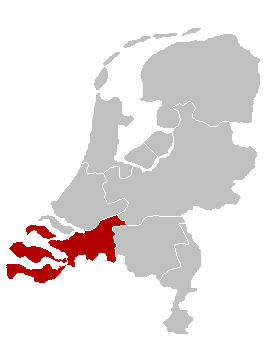
- Location of the Diocese of Breda in the Netherlands

Website
- www.bisdombreda.nl

The Diocese of Breda (Latin: Dioecesis Bredana) is a Latin Church diocese of the Catholic Church in Breda, the Netherlands.

== Description ==
Until 1801 this territory was part of the Roman Catholic Diocese of Antwerp, a diocese suppressed by the Concordat of 1801 (when Antwerp was annexed to France). Breda was then erected as an Apostolic Vicariate in 1803.

The diocese was erected on March 14, 1853, with Johannes van Hooydonk being made its first bishop. The current bishop is Johannes Wilhelmus Maria Liesen. The current cathedral is Saint Anthony of Padua (in Dutch: H. Antonius van Padua) located in the center of Breda.

Its canonical territory consists of the province of Zeeland and part of the province of North Brabant and is subdivided into 112 parishes.

Former Bishops of the Diocese are:

- Johannes van Hooydonk (1853–1867)
- Johannes van Genk (1868–1874)
- Henricus van Beek (1874–1884)
- Petrus Leyten (1885–1914)
- Pieter Hopmans (1914–1951)
- Jozef Baeten (1951–1961)
- Gerardus de Vet (1962–1967)
- Hubertus Ernst (1967–1992)
- Martinus Petrus Maria Muskens (1992–2007)
- Hans van den Hende (2007–2011)
- Johannes Wilhelmus Maria Liesen (2011–present)

The Diocese numbers 136 secular and 159 religious priests and comprises 356 male and 1080 female religious. The number of church goers is nearly 25,000 or 2.2% of the population.

During the 1960s, the relatively strong demarcation between the Catholic south on one side and the Calvinist west and north on the other side of the Netherlands started to diminish. In the second half of the twentieth century a rapid secularization and strong loss of religious affiliation have taken place in North Brabant.

In western North Brabant (Diocese of Breda) is the number of people associating themselves with Catholicism strongly decreased, only 52 percent of the West Brabantians identify as Roman Catholic in 2006. Church attendance is low with only 1 percent of the West Brabantian population visiting churches. North Brabant is mostly Roman Catholic by tradition and still uses the term and certain traditions as a base for its cultural identity, though the vast majority of the population is now largely irreligious in practice. Research among Dutch Catholics in 2006 shows that only 27% of the Dutch Catholics can be regarded as a theist, 55% as an ietsist / agnostic and 17% as atheist.

== See also ==
- Catholic Church in the Netherlands
- Wikipedia page in Dutch about Saint Anthony of Padua Cathedral
