= Johannes van Hooydonk =

- Bishop of Breda
- Native name: Joannes van Hooydonk
- Church: Catholic Church
- Diocese: Diocese of Breda
- In office: 7 January 1827 – October 1867
- Predecessor: Adrianus van Dongen
- Successor: Johannes van Genk
- Other post: Titular Bishop of Dardanus (1842-1853)

Orders
- Consecration: 1 May 1842 by Cornelius Ludovicus de Wijkerslooth

Personal details
- Born: 2 August 1782 Ginneken, Staats-Brabant, Generality Lands, Republic of the Seven United Netherlands
- Died: 25 April 1868 (aged 85)

Johannes van Hooydonk (2 August 1782 in Ginneken – 25 April 1868) was a Dutch clergyman and bishop for the Roman Catholic Diocese of Breda. He was ordained in 1827. He was appointed bishop in 1853. He died in 1868.
