= Hubertus Ernst =

Dutch Catholic bishop (1917–2017)

The Most Reverend Hubertus Ernst
- Bishop emeritus of Diocese of Breda
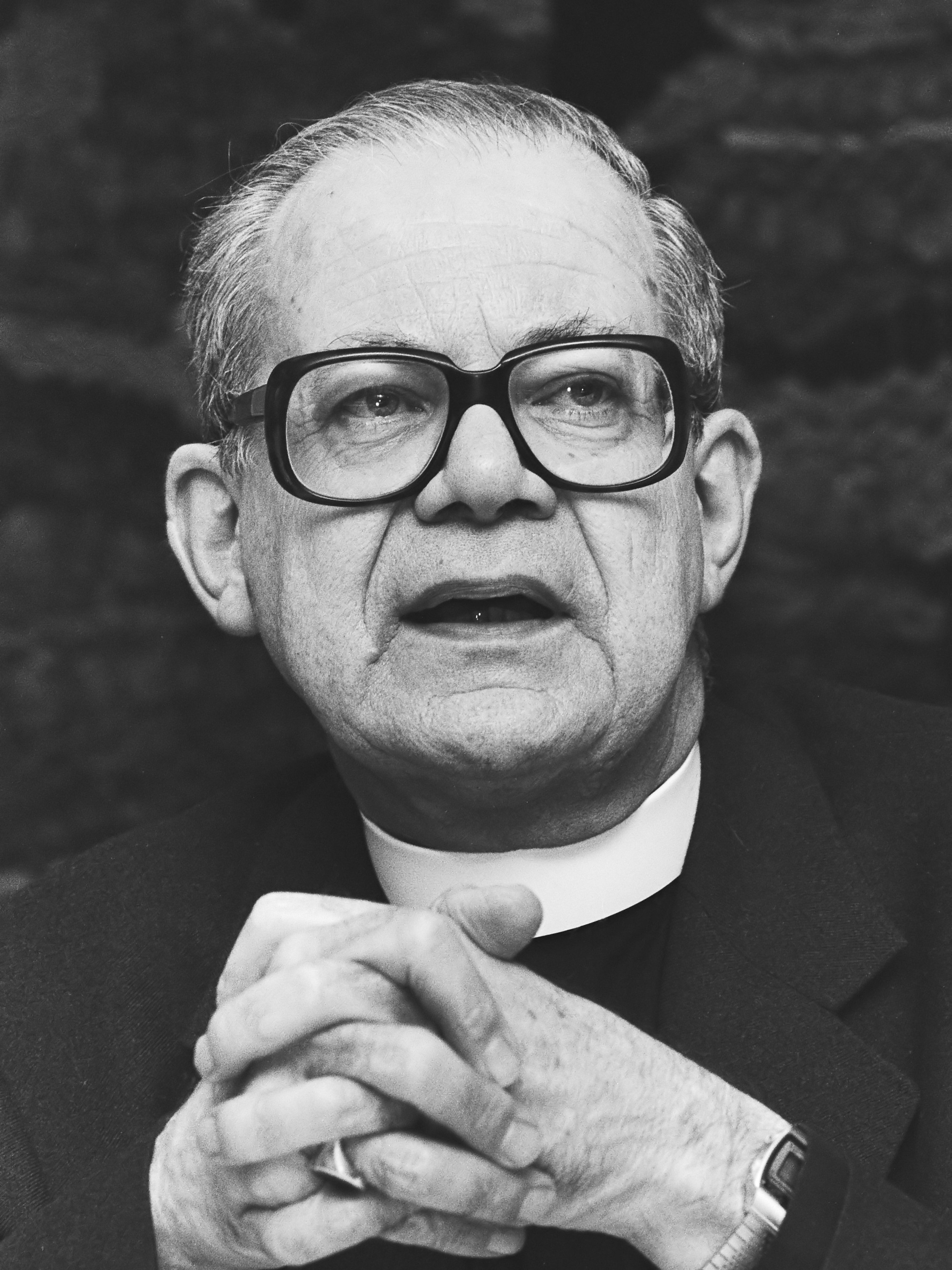
- Bisschop Ernst (1980)
- Church: Roman Catholic Church
- See: Diocese of Breda
- In office: 1967–1994
- Predecessor: Gerardus Hernricus De Vet
- Successor: Martinus Petrus Maria Muskens
- Previous post: Priest

Orders
- Ordination: 7 June 1941

Personal details
- Born: 8 April 1917 Breda, Netherlands
- Died: 19 May 2017 (aged 100) Breda, Netherlands

Hubertus Cornelis Antonius Ernst (8 April 1917 – 19 May 2017) was a Dutch prelate of the Roman Catholic Church. A centenarian, he was the oldest Dutch Roman Catholic bishop at the time of his death in 2017.

== Life ==
Ernst had his seminary years in the Diocese of Breda and was ordained a priest on 7 June 1941. Later he taught moral theology at the diocesan seminary although he never went to a university or any school for further theological training. Ernst, at the time vicar-general of the Diocese of Breda, was appointed bishop of the same Diocese on 3 November 1967 after the sudden death of his predecessor, Gerardus Henricus De Vet; he was consecrated by Cardinal Bernard Alfrink on 17 December the same year. He remained bishop of the Diocese of Breda until retirement on 6 May 1992. He stayed on running the Diocese, however, as an Apostolic Administrator for another two and a half years. Ernst himself consecrated his successor, Martinus Petrus Maria Muskens in 1994, and was in 2007 also co-consecrator when the latter resigned and consecrated the current dignitary Hans van den Hende. He turned 100 in April 2017 and died a month later.

== Pax Christi ==
In 1976 the Dutch Catholic Peace Movement, Pax Christi, asked Ernst to be the next president of the organisation, becoming Alfrink's successor. Ernst, former Professor of Moral Theology at the Diocesan Seminary, had always cherished strong views on for instance nuclear pacifism. Even after his retirement as a bishop and after the end of his presidency at Pax Christi he spoke out vehemently against President George W. Bush's war on terror. In his opinion such views contradicted the moral teaching of the Catholic Church as has been said in § 112 of the encyclical Pacem in terris of Pope John XXIII.

== See also ==
- Diocese of Breda
