= Van Hooydonck =

Van Hooydonck is a Dutch surname. It can refer to:

- Edwig Van Hooydonck (born 1966), Belgian cyclist
- Gino Van Hooydonck (born 1964), Belgian cyclist
- Nathan Van Hooydonck (born 1995), Belgian cyclist, son of Gino and nephew of Edwig

== See also ==
- Van Hooydonk, van Hooijdonk
- Paul Van Hoeydonck (1925–2025), Belgian sculptor and painter
