= Jozef Baeten =

Dutch catholic bishop

- Bishop of Breda
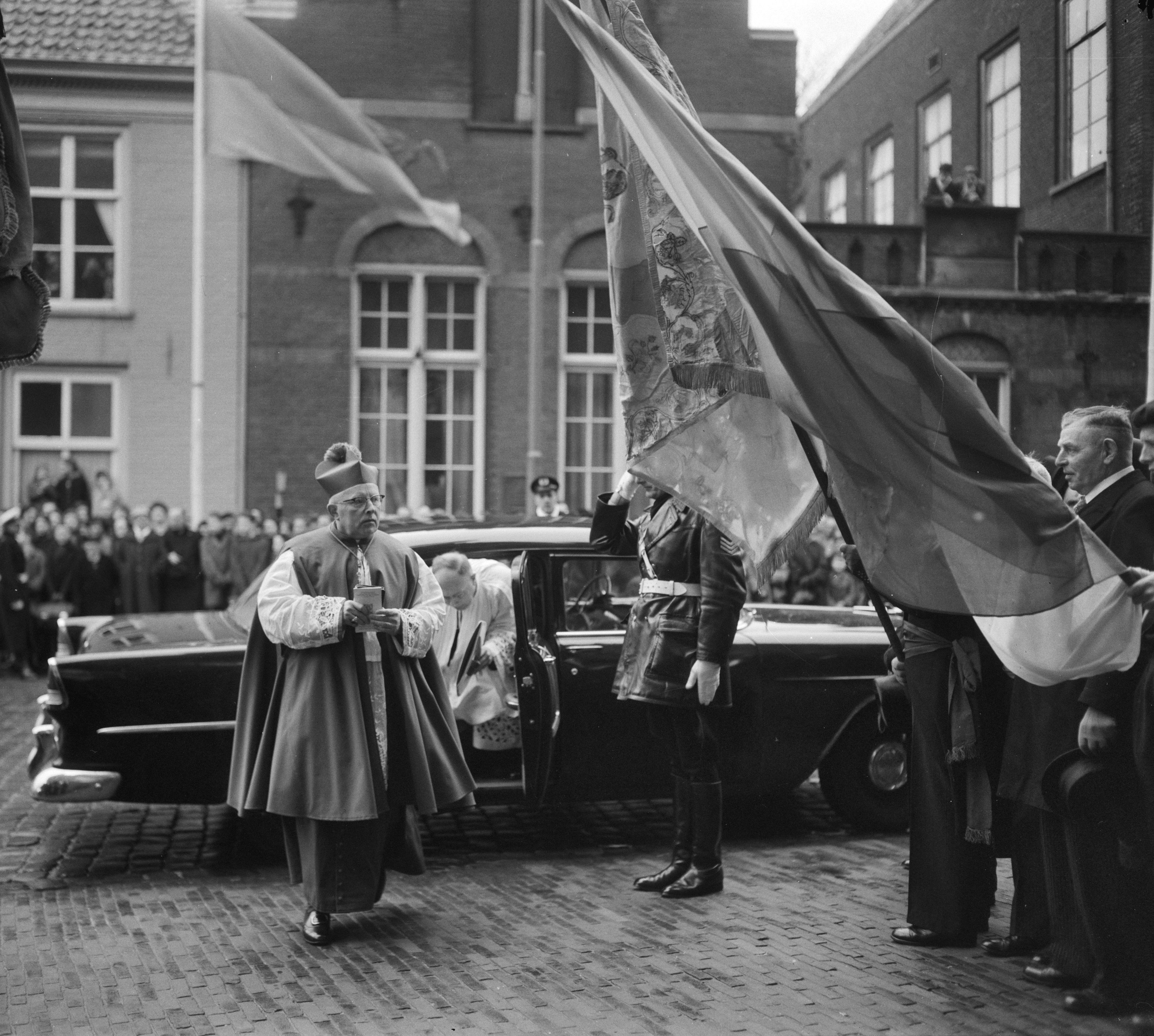
- Baeten in 1957
- Native name: Joseph Wilhelmus Maria Baeten
- Church: Catholic Church
- Diocese: Diocese of Breda
- In office: 18 February 1951 – 8 September 1961
- Predecessor: Pieter Hopmans
- Successor: Gerardus de Vet
- Other post: Titular Archbishop of Stauropolis (1961-1964)
- Previous posts: Titular Bishop of Dorylaëum (1945-1951); Coadjutor Bishop of Breda (1945-1951)

Orders
- Ordination: 2 June 1917
- Consecration: 27 December 1945 by Pieter Hopmans

Personal details
- Born: 8 April 1893 Alphen, North Brabant, Netherlands
- Died: 26 August 1964 (aged 71)

Jozef Baeten (born 8 April 1893, Alphen – 26 August 1964) was a Dutch clergyman and bishop for the Roman Catholic Diocese of Breda. He was ordained in 1917. He was appointed in 1951. He resigned in 1961, and died in 1964.
