= Pieter Hopmans =

Dutch catholic bishop

- Bishop of Breda
- Church: Catholic Church
- Diocese: Diocese of Breda
- In office: 8 September 1914 – 18 February 1951
- Predecessor: Petrus Leyten
- Successor: Jozef Baeten

Orders
- Ordination: 12 October 1890
- Consecration: 1 November 1914 by Henricus van de Wetering

Personal details
- Born: 22 August 1865 Standdaarbuiten, North Brabant, Netherlands
- Died: 18 February 1951 (aged 85)

Pieter Hopmans (born 22 August 1865, Standdaarbuiten – 18 February 1951) was a Dutch clergyman and bishop for the Roman Catholic Diocese of Breda. He was ordained in 1890. He was appointed in 1914. He died in 1951.
