= Bavel, Netherlands =

Bavel
- Village
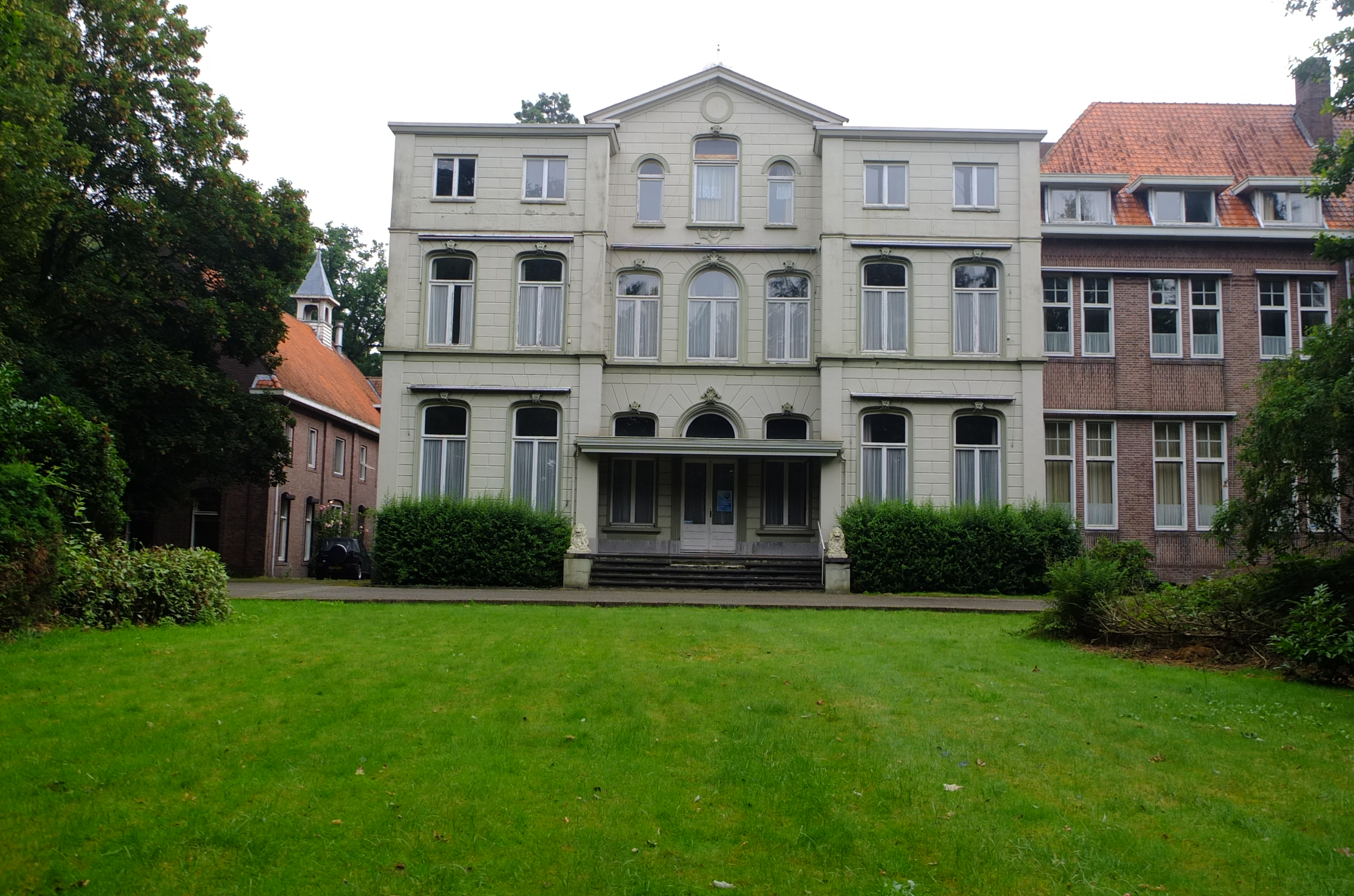
- Former monastery

- Flag Coat of arms

- Location in the province of North Brabant in the Netherlands Bavel (Netherlands)
- Coordinates: 51°34′26″N 4°49′51″E
- Country: Netherlands
- Province: North Brabant
- Municipality: Breda; Alphen-Chaam

Area
  - Total: 12.88 km^{2} (4.97 sq mi)
- Elevation: 7 m (23 ft)

Population (2021)
  - Total: 8.375
  - Density: 0.6502/km^{2} (1.684/sq mi)
- Time zone: UTC+1 (CET)
  - Summer (DST): UTC+2 (CEST)
- Postal code: 4854 & 4895
- Dialing code: 0161

Bavel is a village in southern Netherlands. It is located in the Dutch province of North Brabant, largely within the municipality of Breda with some rural areas in the municipality of Alphen-Chaam.

Bavel has a population of around 8,300. The majority of the inhabitants live in the village itself, and some 590 in the surrounding countryside, including the hamlets of Roosberg, Eikberg, Bolberg, Tervoort, Lijndonk and Lage Aard.

== History ==
Bavel is first mentioned in 1299, in a document dealing with the distribution of the revenues in the parish of Gilze, of which Bavel was a part at that time, and the rights of the Abbey in Thorn, the owners of the area, to collect one tenth of the harvest, called "tienden". The streets "Tiendweg" and "Abdij van Thornstraat" in Bavel bear witness to this historical connection.

In 1316 Bavel was separated from the parish of Gilze and got its own church, devoted to St. Brigida. After the Eighty Years' War in 1648, Catholicism became banned, and the church fell to the Protestants. The catholic population improvised a catholic church in the hamlet of IJpelaar (today part of the city of Breda) until 1743, in which year they built a new church, presumably at the "Kerkeind". In 1809, the French king Lodewijk Napoleon returned the original church back to the catholic population. At that time, a French "telegraphe" was installed on the tower of the church, to convey messages fast from Paris to Amsterdam.

In 1887 a new church building, located roughly opposite the street of the old one, devoted to the Assumption of Mary was taken into use, and is still in use. The location of the old church is now a graveyard, and the little chapel is constructed from material of the old church.

Until 1942 Bavel was part of the municipality of Ginneken en Bavel. In that year the city of Breda annexed Ginneken and what remained of the old borough became Nieuw-Ginneken. In 1997 the municipality of Nieuw Ginneken ceased to exist after the population centres on the border to Breda were annexed by this city. In the period 2003–2006, a new residential area along the former borderline between the city of Breda and Nieuw-Ginneken was established (Nieuw Wolfslaar). The city had also planned to construct a new village at Lijndonk/Tervoort, but these plans have recently been cancelled.

== Gallery ==
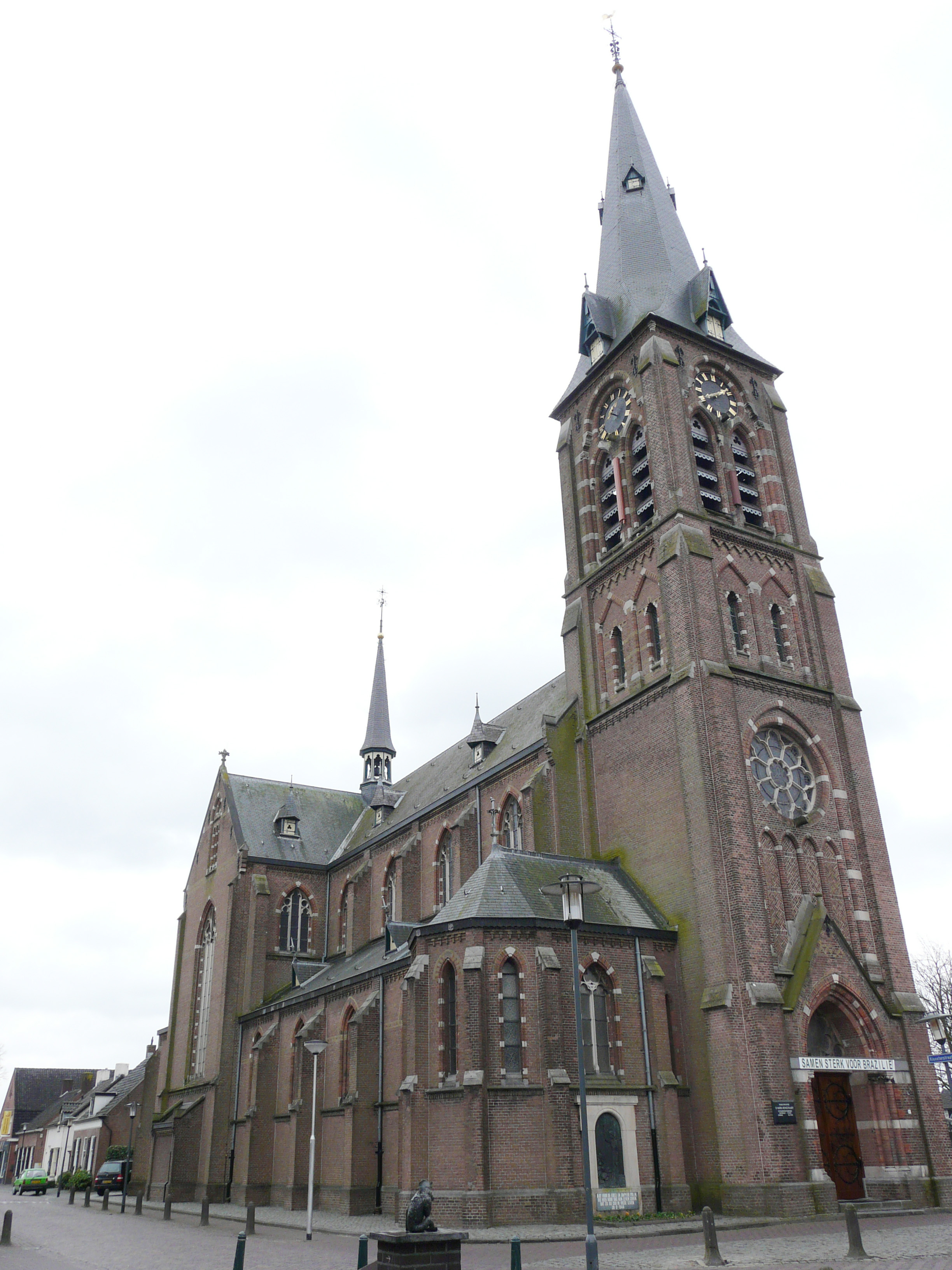
Assumption of Mary Church in Bavel, built in 1887

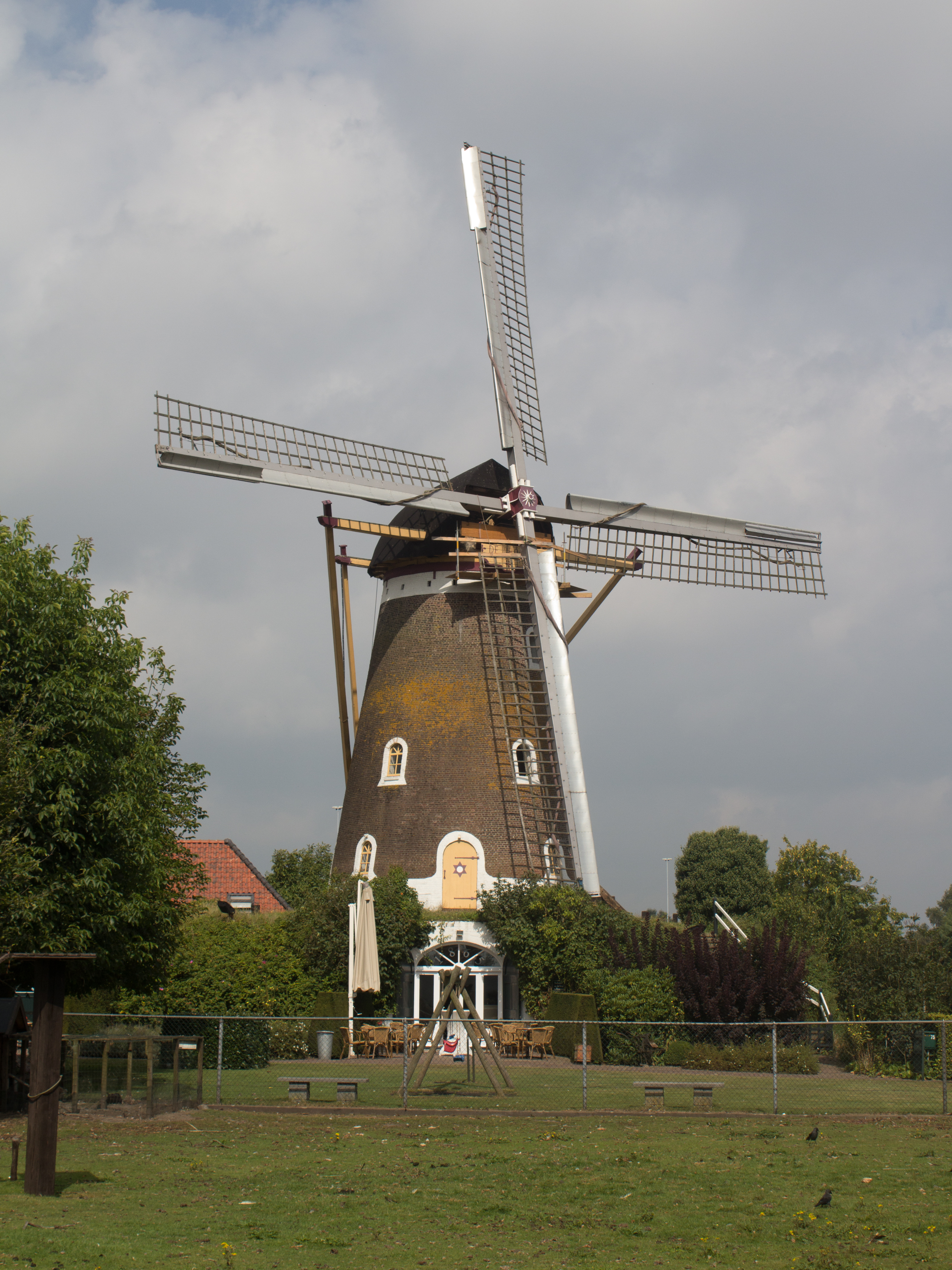
Wind mill De Hoop

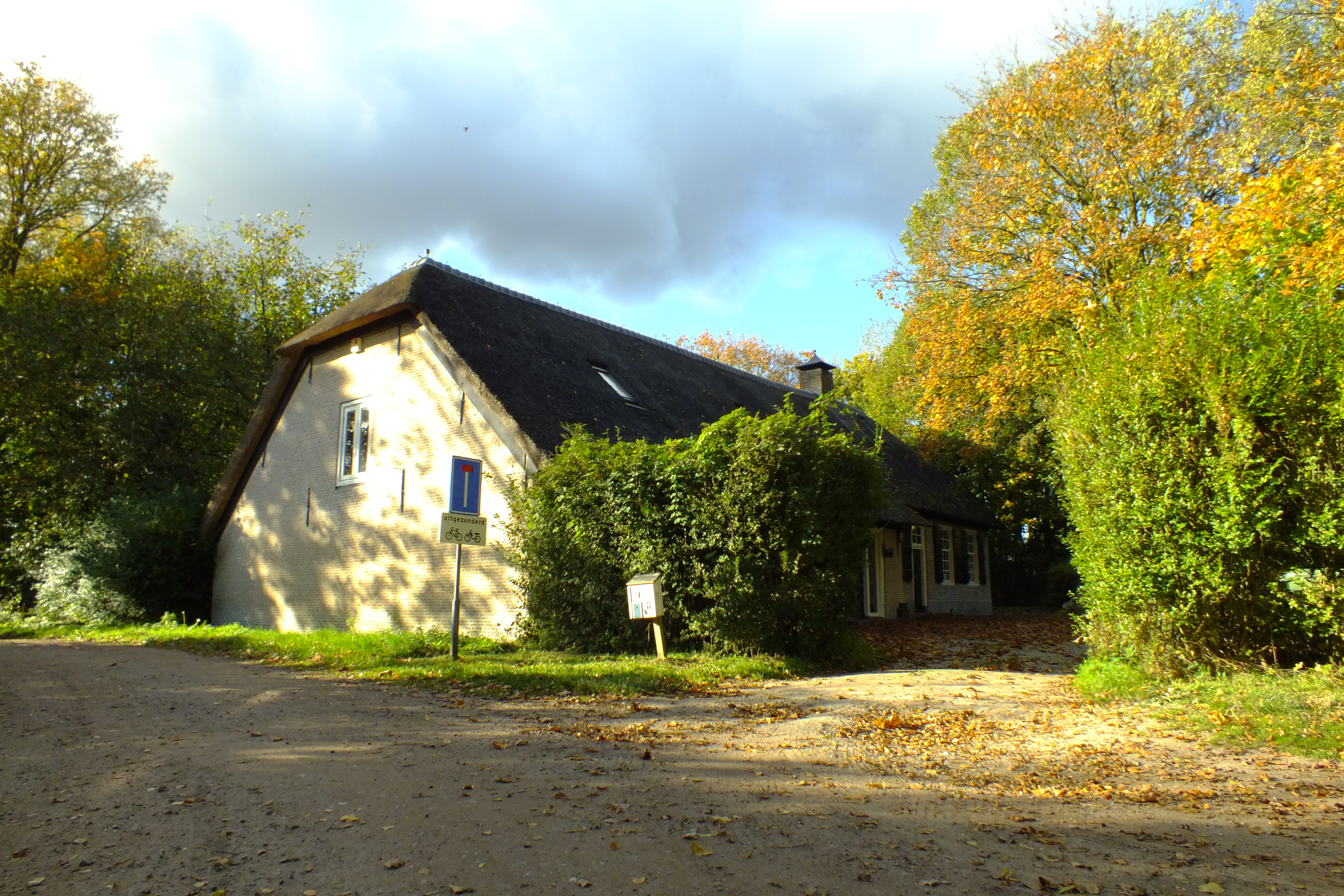
Farm in Bavel

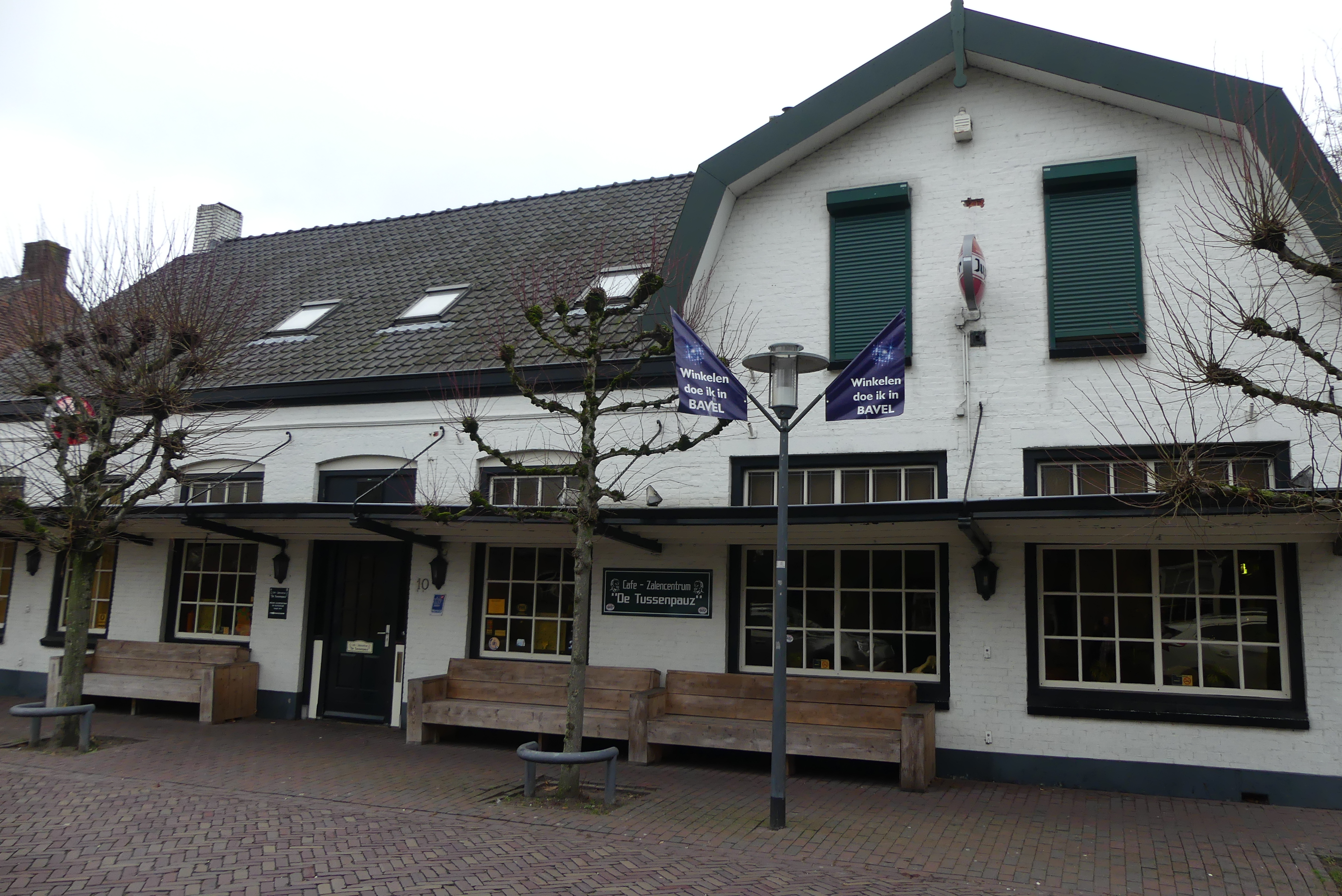
Pub and party centre
