= Ad van Luyn =

Catholic bishop

His Excellency Adrianus van Luyn, S.D.B.
- Bishop Emeritus of Rotterdam
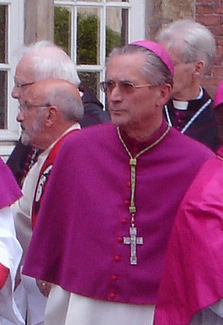
- Bishop Ad van Luyn 4 June 2010
- Church: Catholic Church
- Province: Netherlands
- Diocese: Rotterdam
- Installed: 12 February 1994
- Term ended: 14 January 2011
- Predecessor: Ronald Philippe Bär
- Successor: Johannes Harmannes Jozefus van den Hende

Orders
- Ordination: 9 February 1964
- Consecration: 12 February 1994
- Rank: Bishop

Personal details
- Born: Adrianus Herman van Luyn; 10 August 1935 (age 90) Groningen, Netherlands
- Denomination: Catholic Church

Adrianus Herman (Ad) van Luyn, SDB, (born 10 August 1935) is a Dutch prelate of the Catholic Church. He was the Bishop of Rotterdam from 1994 to 2011 and President of the Commission of the Bishops' Conferences of the European Community from 2006 to 2011.

== Early life and ordination ==
Van Luyn was born in Groningen and attended the seminary of the Salesians in Ugchelen. He made his religious vows in 1954. He studied theology at the Salesian Pontifical University in Turin. He was ordained to the priesthood in 1964 by Giuseppe Beltrami, apostolic nuncio to the Netherlands.

He was provincial superior of the Salesians in the Netherlands from 1975 to 1981. He taught for a time at the Salesians' school attached to the Don Rua monastery in 's-Heerenberg.

== Bishop ==
Pope John Paul II named him Bishop of Rotterdam on 27 November 1993 and he was installed in 12 February 1994.

From 2008 to 2011 he was President of the Dutch Episcopal Conference. His motto is Collabora Evangelio.

From 2000 to 2006 he was Vice-President and from 2006 to 2011 he was President of the Commission of the Bishops' Conferences of the European Community. In that role in October 2009 he welcomed the Irish vote ratifying the Treaty of Lisbon. He said that the treaty would improve communication between the institutions of the European Community (EC) and that the specific assurances given to Ireland would help protect "the right to life, the protection of family and the right of parents to educate their children" throughout the EC.

Pope Benedict XVI accepted his resignation on 14 January 2011.

Catholic Church titles
Preceded by Ronald Philippe Bär	Bishop of Rotterdam; 1994–2011	Succeeded by Johannes Harmannes Jozefus van den Hende
