= St. Anthony of Padua Cathedral, Breda =

Coordinates: 51.5875°N 4.7775°E

St. Anthony of Padua Cathedral
- Kathedrale Sint Antonius van Paduakerk
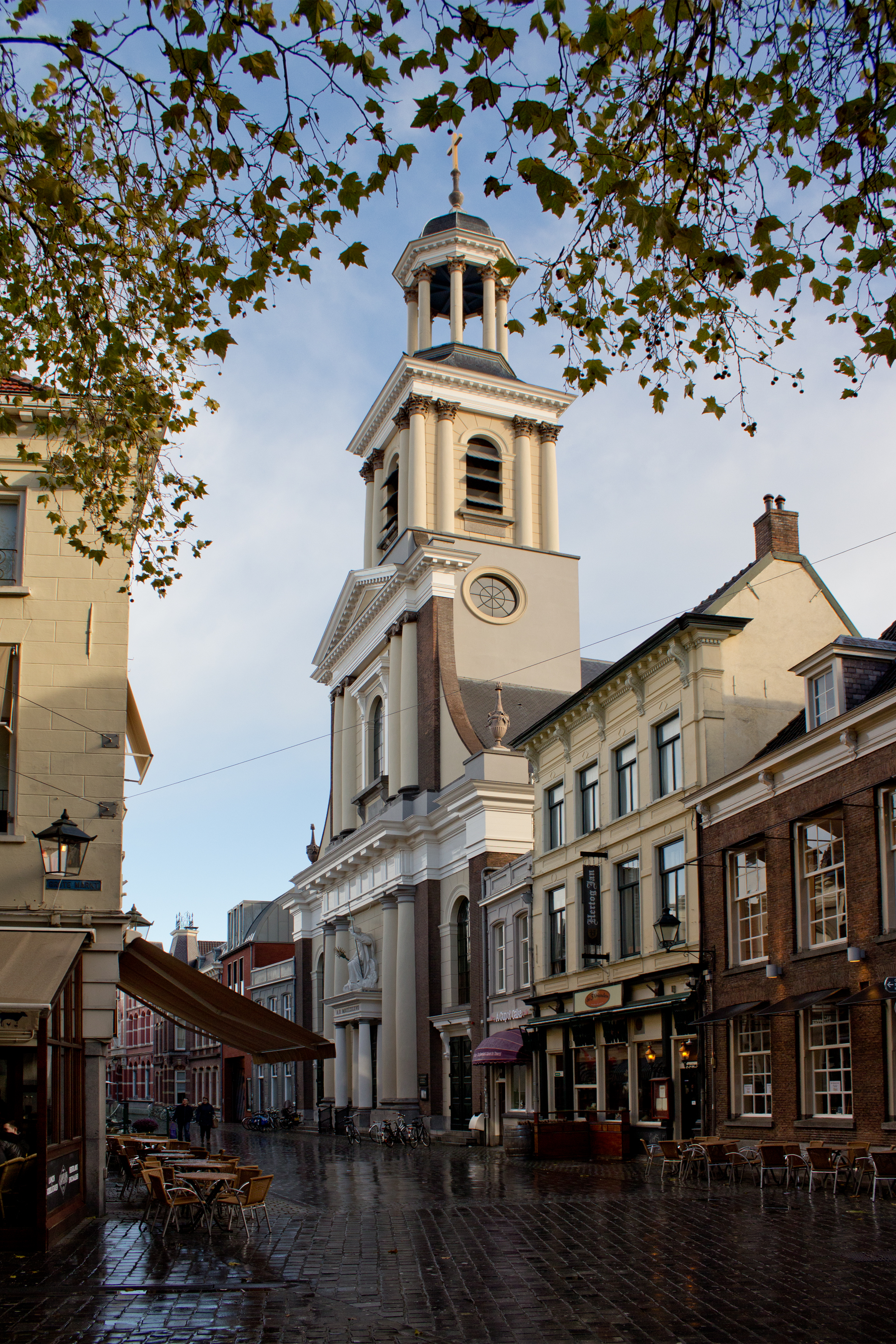
- St. Anthony of Padua Cathedral
- Location: Breda
- Country: Netherlands
- Denomination: Roman Catholic Church

The St. Anthony of Padua Cathedral (Dutch: Sint-Antoniuskathedraal) or Cathedral of St. Anthony, is the Roman Catholic cathedral of the Diocese of Breda, located in the city of Breda, in the Netherlands.

The church of Sint Antonius is a so-called waterstaatskerk, because its construction was paid largely by the government and conducted under the supervision of civil engineers. The church was built in 1837 by architect Peter Huijsers in neoclassical style, as is evident on the front façade, can be distinguished from the bottom up Doric, Ionic and Corinthian elements, while the pediment under the bell tower resembles a Greek temple.

In 1853, the church was elevated to the status of cathedral. In 1876, it was no longer a cathedral as St. Barbara's Church became the cathedral for the diocese. In 1968, St. Barbara Cathedral closed and St Michael's Church became the cathedral. St Michael's Cathedral was later demolished and on 1 January 2001, the St. Anthony's Church once again became the cathedral, at the request of bishop Muskens.

== See also ==
- Roman Catholicism in the Netherlands
- Roman Catholic Diocese of Breda
