= Hans van den Hende =

Dutch Roman Catholic clergyman (born 1964)

His Excellency Johannes H.J. van den Hende
- Bishop of Rotterdam
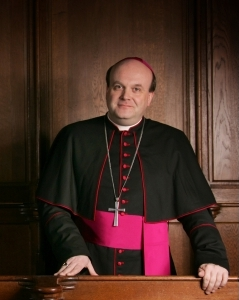
- Mgr. Dr. Hans van den Hende
- Native name: Hans van den Hende
- Church: Roman Catholic
- Province: Utrecht
- Diocese: Roman Catholic Diocese of Rotterdam
- Appointed: 10 May 2011
- Installed: 2 July 2011
- Predecessor: Ad van Luyn

Orders
- Ordination: 6 April 1991 by Jan Niënhaus
- Consecration: 25 November 2006 by Martinus Petrus Maria Muskens

Personal details
- Born: Johannes Hermannes Jozefus van den Hende; January 9, 1964 (age 62) Groningen
- Motto: Sine Timore Serviamus Illi
- Coat of arms

Styles of Hans van den Hende
- Reference style: Most Reverend
- Spoken style: Your Excellency
- Religious style: Bishop

Johannes Hermannes Jozefus (Hans) van den Hende (Groningen, January 9, 1964) is a Dutch Roman Catholic clergyman. He was appointed bishop of the diocese of Breda on October 31, 2007. On 10 May 2011, Pope Benedict XVI appointed him bishop of the diocese of Rotterdam.

Van den Hende attended the local secondary school in Haren. He studied philosophy and theology at the Catholic University of Utrecht. At the Gregorianum in Rome he obtained a doctorate of Canon Law with a dissertation that focused of the changing role of episcopal conferences since the Second Vatican Council. He was ordained to the priesthood in 1991.

From 2000 Van den Hende served as vicar general for the diocese of Groningen-Leeuwarden. In 2007 Pope Benedict XVI appointed him bishop of Breda. He is the youngest member of the Dutch episcopal conference.

== Sources ==
- Hans van den Hende on www.catholic-hierarchy.org
- (in Dutch) Bisschop Van den Hende weet wat hij wil, Katholiek Nieuwsblad, 15 September 2006
- (in Dutch) Hans van den Hende 'Je moet nooit op je voorganger willen lijken'
