= Provenierskerk =

Roman Catholic church in Rotterdam, Netherlands

Coordinates: 51°55′38″N 4°28′13″E

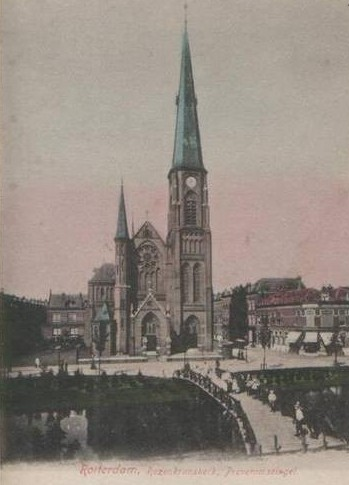
Provenierskerk

The Our Lady of the Holy Rosary Church, also known as the Provenierskerk or Proveniershuis Singelkerk, was a Roman Catholic church on the Proveniershuis canal in Rotterdam, Netherlands.

The church was built between 1898 and 1899 by the architectural firm of Albert Margry and Joseph Snickers. Margry designed a three-aisled church in neo-Gothic style, with a tower next to the facade. Provenierskerk was consecrated on May 8, 1899, by the Bishop of Haarlem. The first year it had no church bells, which were only installed in 1910. In 1916 the church received an organ. On the side walls of the church was a special Stations of the Cross, which was created by the Delft Factory The Royal Delft. A marble communion rail was placed in the church in 1914. The church was served by the Fathers Dominicans.

The first year the church was in the parish of the Allerheiligst Hart van Jezuskerk on the Van Oldenbarneveltstraat, but in 1923 the Provenierskerk became an independent parish. In the years before World War II, the district had an influx of Catholics and the church was crowded.

The Provenierskerk remained intact from the bombing of Rotterdam, after which it was also used by believers of other parishes whose churches were destroyed. During the war the Father organized the local opposition from the church. In 1942 the church bells were looted by the Germans, but were replaced in 1947. One of the pastors of the church was Nicolaas Apeldoorn.

In 1960, the number of believers fell strongly and it was not profitable for the church to open; after the last Mass on Aug. 31, 1975, the church was sold to the city of Rotterdam, which then demolished the building. Unlike many other churches that were threatened with demolition, Provenierskerk never conducted operations in order to preserve the church, as it was felt that the building had no historical value. Subsequently, a nursing home was built on the site of the church. The Stations of the Cross and the statue of Maria were transferred to the Albertus de Grotekerk in Blijdorp.
