= Nieuw-Ginneken =

Coordinates: 51.542705°N 4.806519°E

Coat of Arms

Nieuw-Ginneken was a municipality in the Dutch province of North Brabant, located southeast of the city of Breda. It was created in 1942 from part of the municipality of Ginneken en Bavel, and existed until 1997 when its parts north of the A58 motorway merged with Breda, and the parts south of the motorway, containing the villages of Strijbeek, Galder and some outer parts of Ulvenhout merged with Alphen-Chaam.
