= Heuvelse kerk =

- Sint-Jozefkerk
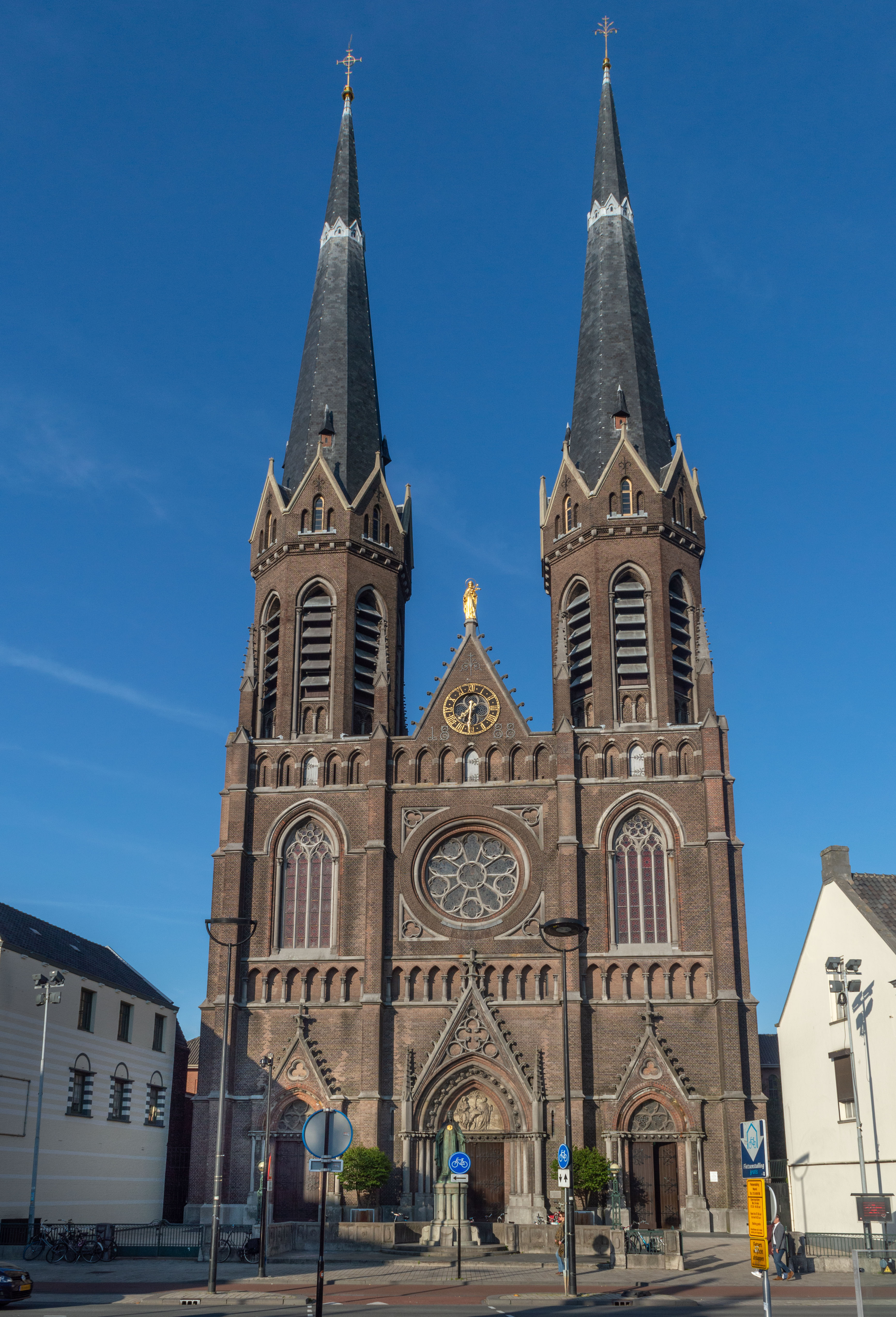
- Western facade

- Location within North Brabant
- 51°33′28.3″N 5°05′29.2″E
- Location: Tilburg, North Brabant
- Country: Netherlands
- Denomination: Catholic Church

History
- Status: Church
- Dedication: Saint Joseph
- Consecrated: 1 July 1889

Architecture
- Functional status: Active
- Heritage designation: Rijksmonument (no. 35713)
- Designated: 3 August 1976
- Architect: Hendrik van Tulder
- Architectural type: Cruciform basilica
- Style: Neo-Gothic
- Years built: 1871–1873, 1887–1889
- Construction cost: fl. 195,000

Specifications
- Height: 72 m (236 ft)

Administration
- Diocese: 's-Hertogenbosch
- Parish: – St. Jozef (1874–2012) – De Goede Herder (since 2012)

The Heuvelse kerk (Heuvel church; also Sint-Jozefkerk) is a neo-Gothic Catholic church in the center of the Dutch city Tilburg. Dedicated to Saint Joseph, it is one of two major Catholic churches in the city center together with the Heikese kerk. It is located along the square Heuvel, after which it is named. A 1921 statue of the Sacred Heart is located in front of the building.

Construction of the church was divided into two phases due to financial constraints. The first part of the Heuvelse kerk was built in the period 1871–73, while the second phase took place between 1887 and 1889 and included the current front facade with its two towers. The church was consecrated in 1889 by the bishop of the Diocese of 's-Hertogenbosch. It was built in the garden of a barracks and was meant to accommodate Tilburg's increasing population. The barracks were renovated simultaneously to become a clergy house. The only major adjustment to the original building, designed by Hendrik van Tulder, was an extension of both transepts in the 1950s.

The Heuvelse kerk has the floor plan of a cruciform basilica. Its most prominent exterior feature are the two towers with their height of 72 metres (236 ft). Three portals in the front facade contain entrances, the central one being decorated with a relief showing the flight into Egypt. A copper-gilded statue of Saint Joseph sits on top of a gable between the towers. The interior is covered by a four-part rib vault and includes two organs and a winged altarpiece by Hendrik van der Geld, created between 1878 and 1881. Frescos of the Stations of the Cross were painted two decades after the church's inauguration by Georges de Geetere.

In 2019, the parish announced plans to sell the Heuvelse kerk, but the bishop has postponed those plans.

== History ==
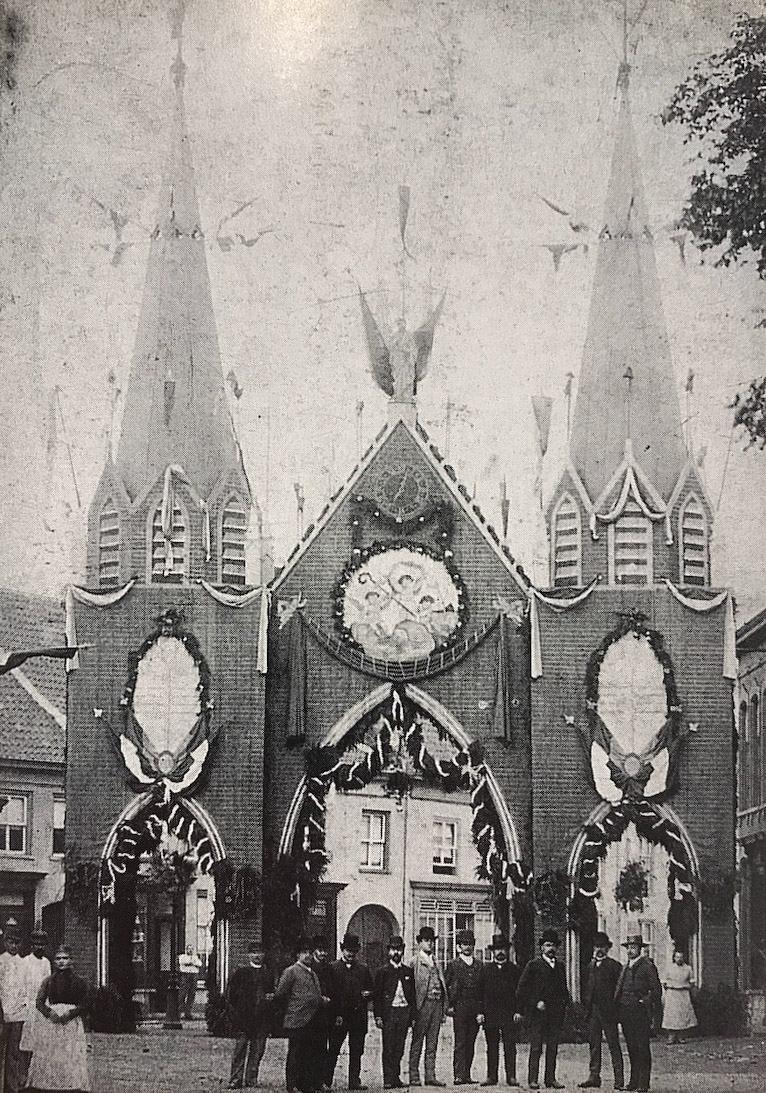
The committee that organized the consecration in 1889 posing in front of a triumphal arch resembling the church (located at the end of the Bosscheweg)

=== Construction and consecration ===
Before the Heuvelse kerk was built, the area was part of the Tilburg parish "'t Heike", of which the Heikese kerk was the parish church. Due to a growing population, its management wanted to create a new parish, called "St. Jozef" or "Heuvel", with a new church at the location of a Royal Marechaussee barracks along the Heuvel, a square in the city center. Bishop Johannes Zwijsen approved the plan in 1870. He put Jan van der Lee, a curate, in charge of the construction process of the Heuvelse kerk. In December of that same year, the parish exchanged lands surrounding the Heikese kerk for the barracks and its garden with the municipal government after the municipal council and the provincial-executive had approved the deal. In order for the new church to be accessible from the Heuvel, two houses along that square were purchased for fl. 10,000 and demolished afterwards. The barracks itself was left standing to be used as a clergy house, while the church itself would be erected entirely within the barracks' gardens. Van der Lee raised fl. 30,000 from parishioners for the construction, and subsequently, in 1871, a building commission was established by the bishop. A design for the Heuvelse kerk was made by Hendrik van Tulder and approved by the bishop.

Construction of the church was divided into two phases, because the parish did not have enough money to build it at once. The first phase started in 1871 and included about half of the church as it stands today, encompassing the choir, the transepts, and two bays of the nave, at a cost of fl. 92,000. In a call for bids, the lowest of the three bids amounted to fl. 112,000. However, the first number was reached after it was decided to cut back on building materials. The Heuvelse kerk was inaugurated by Van der Lee on 15 October 1873, and the first public service was held on the first day of the next month. Van der Lee was supposed to become the parish priest of St. Jozef, but instead ended up in that same position at the parish 't Heike because of another priest's death. The bishop finally named Martinus van der Hagen the parish priest of St. Jozef. However, he died in 1875 and was succeeded by Antonius Donatus Smits. In the years after the completion of the first part of the Heuvelse kerk, statues, ornaments, and the winged altarpiece were added to the interior.

The second construction phase, that included the front facade with the two towers, and restoration of the existing part began in November 1887. The contract was worth fl. 103,000 after it was decided to add four instead of five bays. The towers topped out in October 1888. A construction worker died that same month after falling down from a height of 30 metres (98 ft). The Heuvelse kerk was finished in 1889 and consecrated on July 1 by Bishop Adrianus Godschalk of the Diocese of 's-Hertogenbosch. The event was followed by a Mass, while celebrations had started the day before. The church was decorated, and six temporary triumphal arches were erected spanning streets close to it, one of which was a scale model of the church.

=== Subsequent years ===
After the construction had ended, more additions were made including a new organ. It was inaugurated in March 1894. Parish Priest Smits died in 1908 after having been in that position for 33 years, earning the position of Officer in the Order of Orange-Nassau. He was succeeded by Adrianus Norbertus Mutsaers. Mutsaers died in 1916 and was replaced by Johannes Leonardus Brekelmans. Under his lead, central heating was installed in the church. A statue of the Sacred Heart in front of the church was unveiled in 1921. It was a present by the citizens of Tilburg. Subsequently, between 1922 and 1966 a yearly parade was held to pay tribute to the Sacred Heart.

A carillon consisting of 35 bells, founded by the British Gillett & Johnston, was installed in the south tower in 1925. It was a present from the parishioners to celebrate the golden jubilee (50 years) of the parish. It operated automatically, but also had a manual keyboard. The weight of the bells ranged from 6 kg (13 lb) to over 1,080 kg (2,380 lb). It was first played on by Belgian carillon player Jef Denyn on the day of the Sacred Heart parade in June. Initially, the carillon sounded every 15 minutes during the entire day, but starting in 1931 the carillon was turned off during night-time after complaints. In January and February 1943, during the German occupation in World War II, the Germans removed the bronze bells of the carillon. Although a few new bells were put into place in 1947 after a collection was taken, the carillon was never restored. One of the new bells, named "St. Jozef", was founded by Petit & Fritsen and weighs 1,793 kg (3,953 lb).

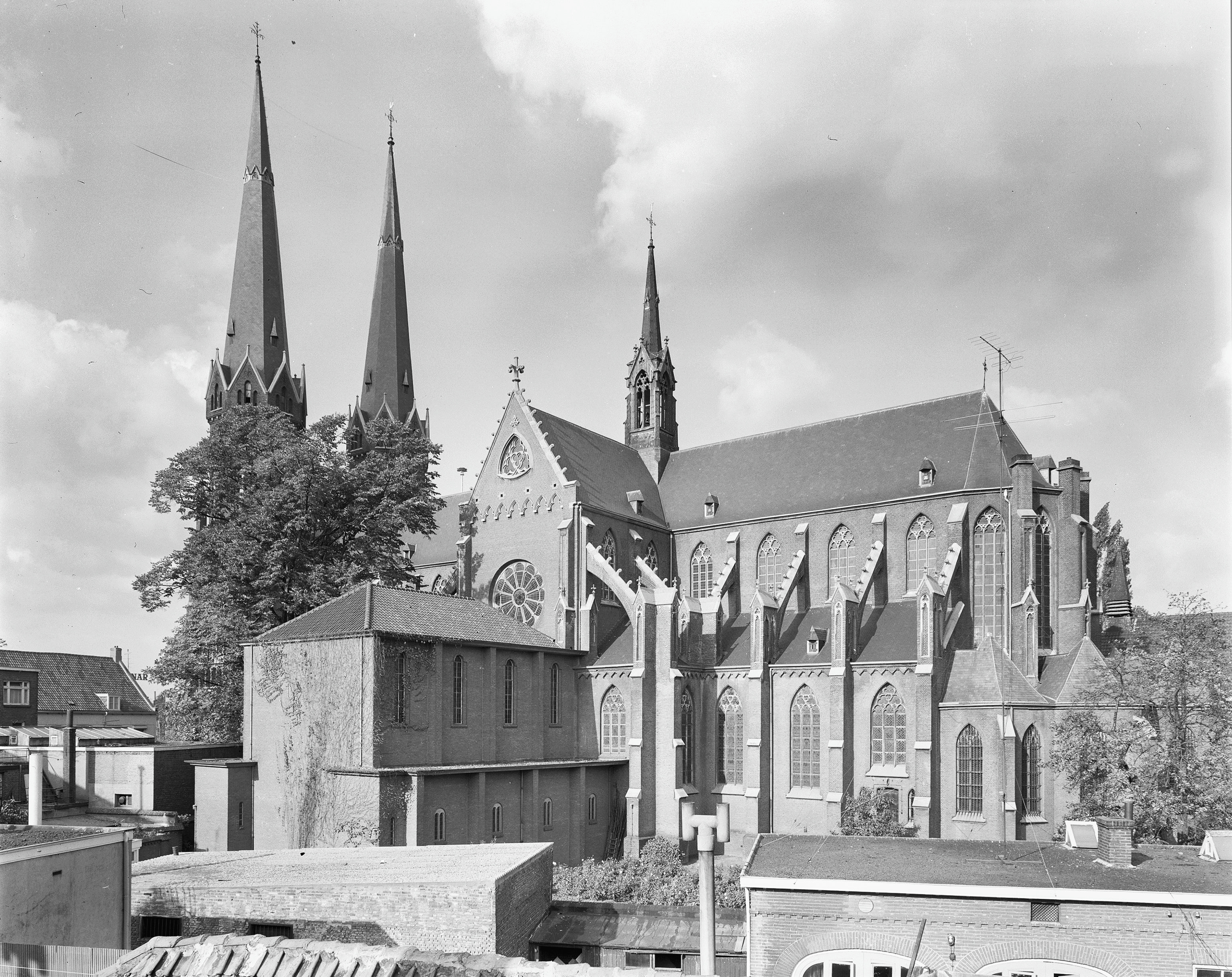
The south facade with one of the extended transepts visible

The Heuvelse kerk underwent a renovation in the years 1955–56 by the architectural firm of Jos Donders to extend the two transepts. During September of the first year of construction, most of the old south transept collapsed creating a hole in the church and damaging the extension, that was still under construction. The roof remained in place. Masses were resumed two weeks later, when the church was deemed safe. The contractor was later acquitted in a criminal trial. A number of smaller restorations took place in the period between 1980 and 1996. During one of them, an iron fence was placed at the west end of the nave to make it possible to halt visitors.

In 2012, the parish St. Jozef was merged with five other parishes to form "De Goede Herder" (Dutch for "the Good Shepherd"), causing the Heuvelse kerk to lose its status as parish church. Its priest at the time, Jan van Noorwegen, had served since 1984. The parish announced in 2019 that either the Heuvelse kerk or the Heikese kerk would close due to a drop in attendance and the financial burden of both churches. On Christmas Day, the parish expressed its plans to sell the Heuvelse kerk. Bishop Gerard de Korte decided in 2020 that the church would remain open for at least another five years and that possible new purposes would be investigated in the meantime. Those options include selling only part of the church.

== Architecture ==
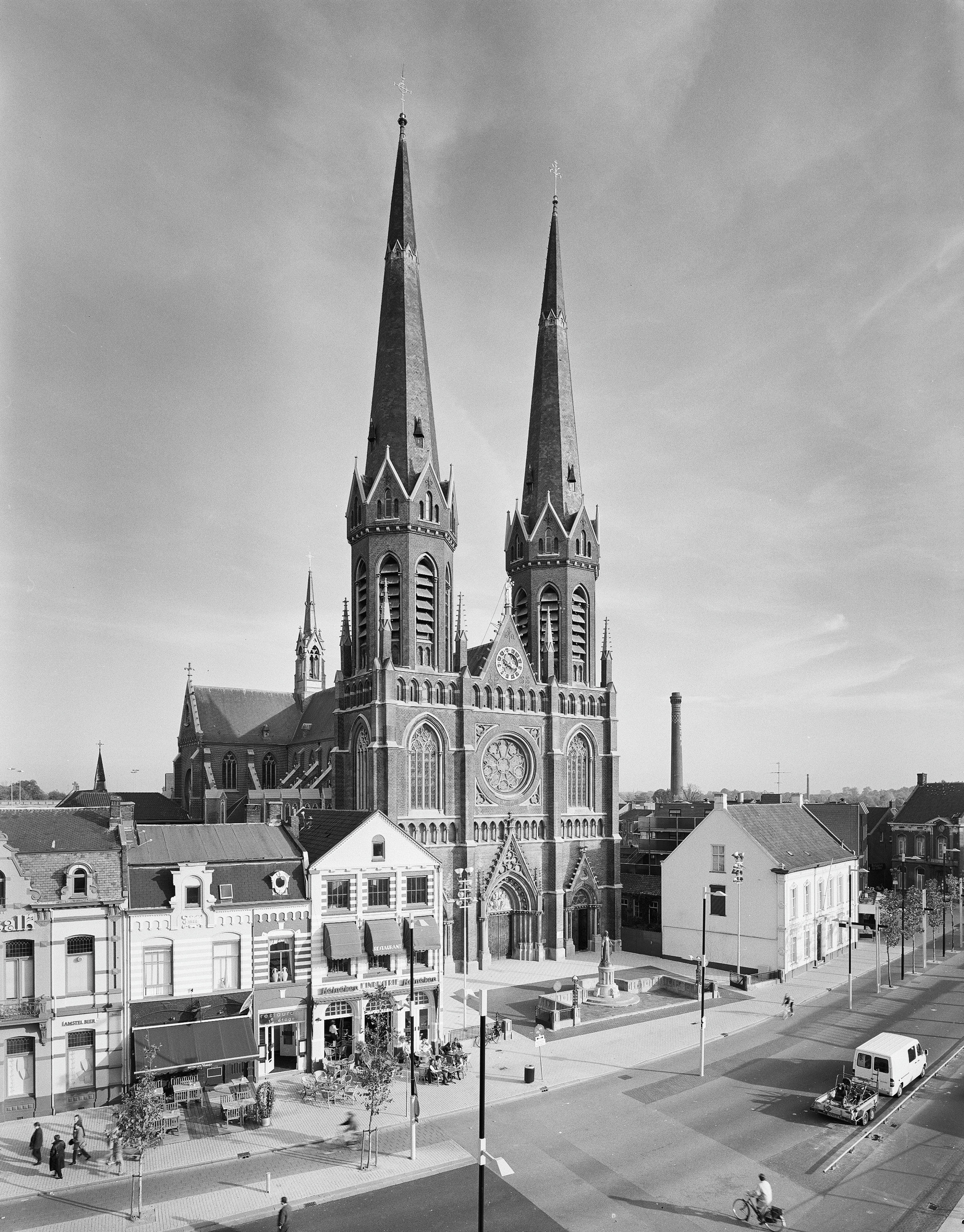
The church in 1993 (the clergy house is the white building on the right)

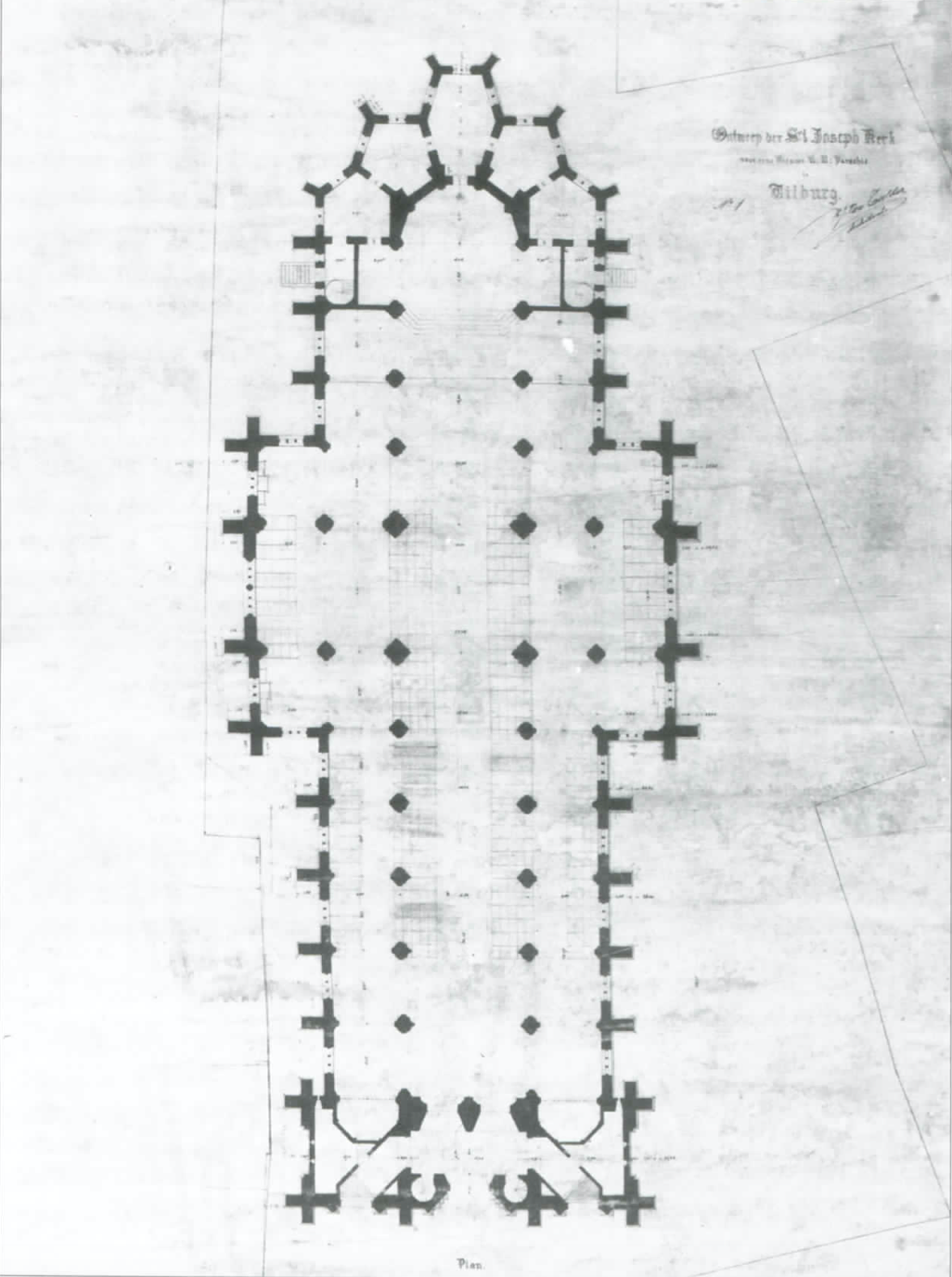
Floor plan from 1887 (it does not show the extension of the transepts)

=== Exterior ===
The church is situated along Heuvelring in close proximity to the Heuvel, a square in the city center from which it derives its name. It is a cruciform basilica in neo-Gothic style with its floor plan pointing in the direction east-northeast. The Heuvelse kerk was designed by Hendrik van Tulder, who designed numerous other buildings in Tilburg including the old town hall two decades earlier and also several churches. The church has been a rijksmonument since 1976.

The west facade features three portals that are all topped by wimpergs. The central portal is slightly larger and contains a relief depicting the flight into Egypt created by sculptor Piet van Tielraden in 1890. Furthermore, the architect's name is inscribed on the right side of that portal. The space above the entrances contains three leaded windows, one of which is a rose window. Behind them, a light art installation dubbed "light carillon" is situated that was made by Paul van Dongen and Michiel Verheggen in 2000. It is activated after sunset. The installation was financed by sponsors and the municipality, that put their money into the Stichting Lichtcarillon Heuvel. That foundation transferred the ownership to the parish three years later.

The two church towers, having a height of 72 metres (236 ft), are also part of the front facade. They both have eight sides and are topped by gables and a steep spire. The central gable of the Heuvelse kerk is located between the towers and features a turret clock and the number "1888", the year in which the towers topped out. The clock is from the 19th century and was later electrified. A copper-gilded statue of Saint Joseph, to whom the church is dedicated, can be seen on the top of the gable. It is 2.20 metres (7 ft 3 in) tall and was reportedly replaced after the original fell down during a 1921 storm. The Heuvelse kerk features flying buttresses and tracery. Furthermore, a ridge turret sits on top of the crossing.

A statue of the Sacred Heart by August Hermans has been situated in front of the church since 1921. The visible heart of the statue used to be made out of actual gold, but it was replaced by a replica of gilded copper in 1982 after an attempted theft. A clergy house with a garden behind it is located to the right of the front facade. It still fulfills this function.

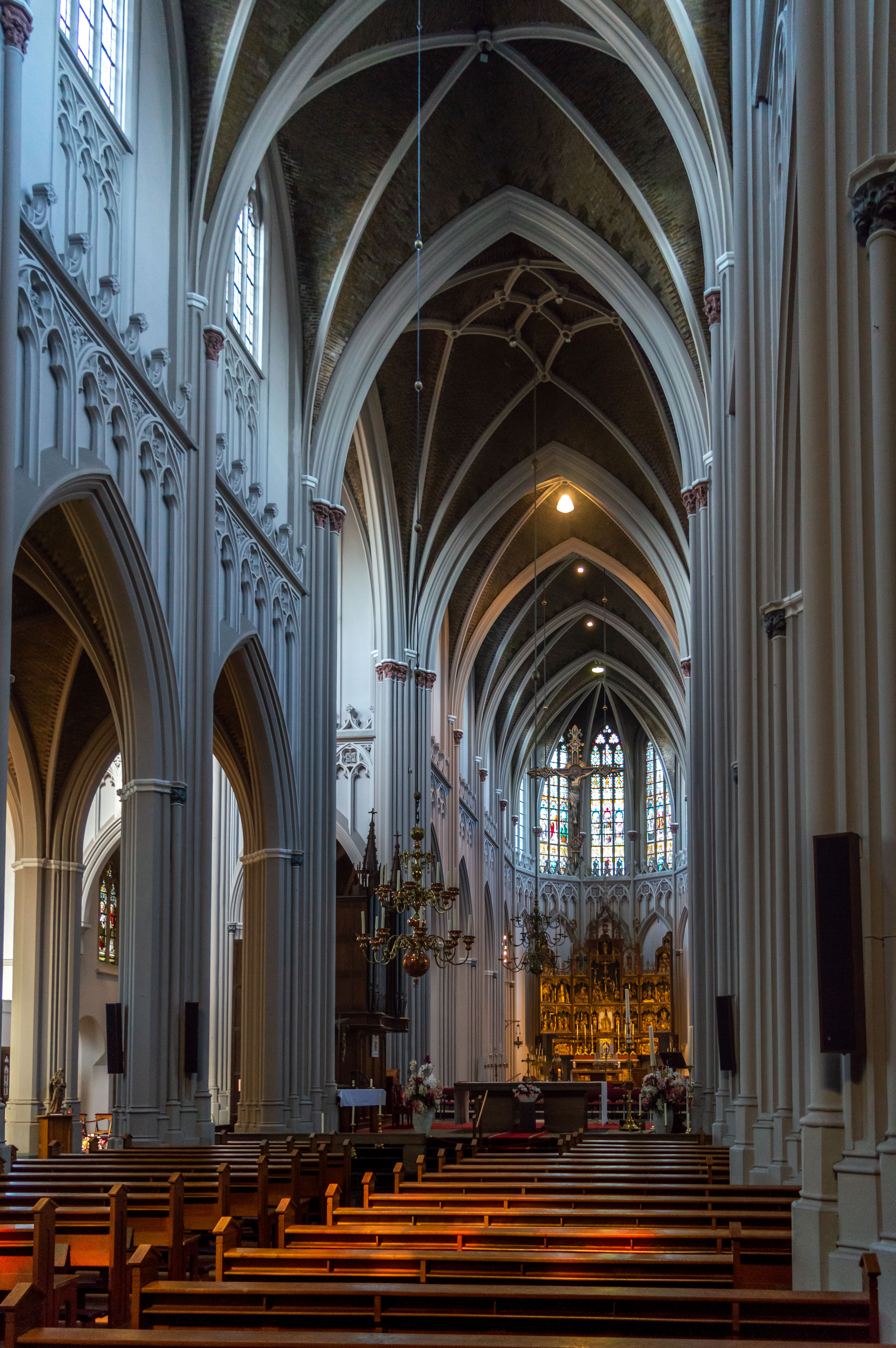
Interior of the Heuvelse kerk

=== Interior ===
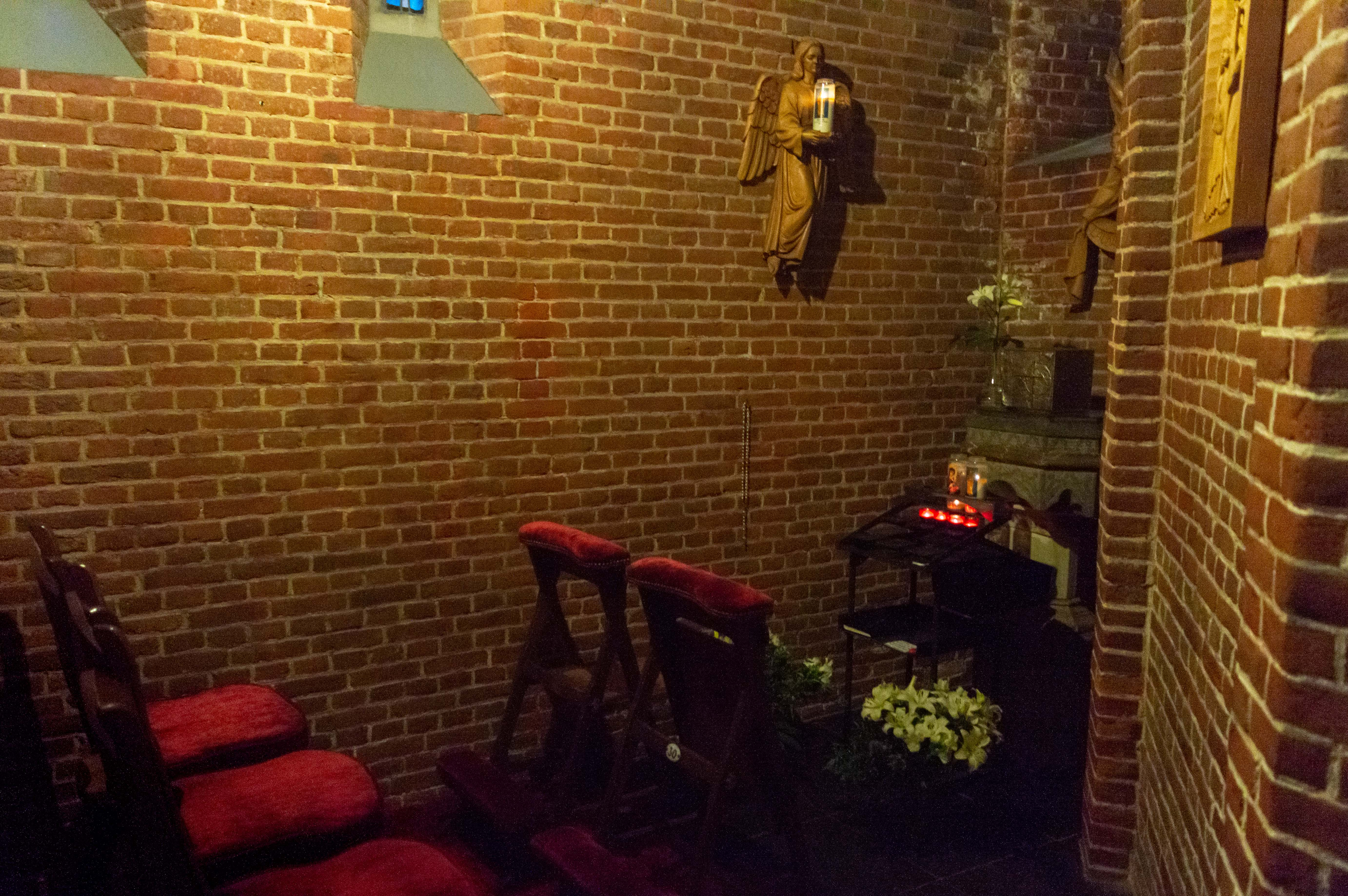
Chapel of Perpetual Worship

Behind the entrance hall, there is the nave, that is six bays long and is flanked by two side aisles. The aisles are separated from the nave by a colonnade, of which the pillars are connected by pointed arches. Ornaments are placed in between the arches and the windows. These leaded windows are mostly from the period 1901–10 and depict several Dutch saints. The interior or the Heuvelse kerk is covered by a stone four-part rib vault except for the joint of the cross, where the rib vault has a starlike shape. The bays of the nave from the first construction phase (1871–73) have, in contrast to the newer part, a painted leaf pattern along the sides of the rib vault. The plastered side walls of the nave feature frescos of the Stations of the Cross, painted by the Belgian painter Georges de Geetere in 1909–10. The painter has subtly incorporated the birth of Juliana, who was born in 1909, into the eighth station. A girl with an orange sash can be seen next to a little crown and Juliana's date of birth. A few years later, De Geetere also created paintings in two of the church's chapels.

The two transepts are located on either side of the crossing. They used to be shallow, but were extended by parts with a lower ceiling in the Early Christian style between 1955 and 1956. The transepts have side aisles, but they are narrower in the extended part. Besides, in that section, the aisles are separated by rounded instead of pointed arches and the windows are arched. The choir has a length of three bays and contains a crucifix that is hanging from the ceiling. Sacristies are situated on both sides. The apse is surrounded by chapels.

The Chapel of Perpetual Worship (Dutch: Kapel van Altijddurende Aanbidding) is located close to the entrance of the Heuvelse kerk. This chapel has been opened 24/7 since 1991 and is supposed to be always occupied by worshippers, making it one of a few places in the Netherlands where this tradition is continued. However, Brabants Dagblad reported attendance is dwindling, and it is sometimes empty. The chapel itself contains chairs, prie-dieux, and a tabernacle.

=== Altarpiece ===
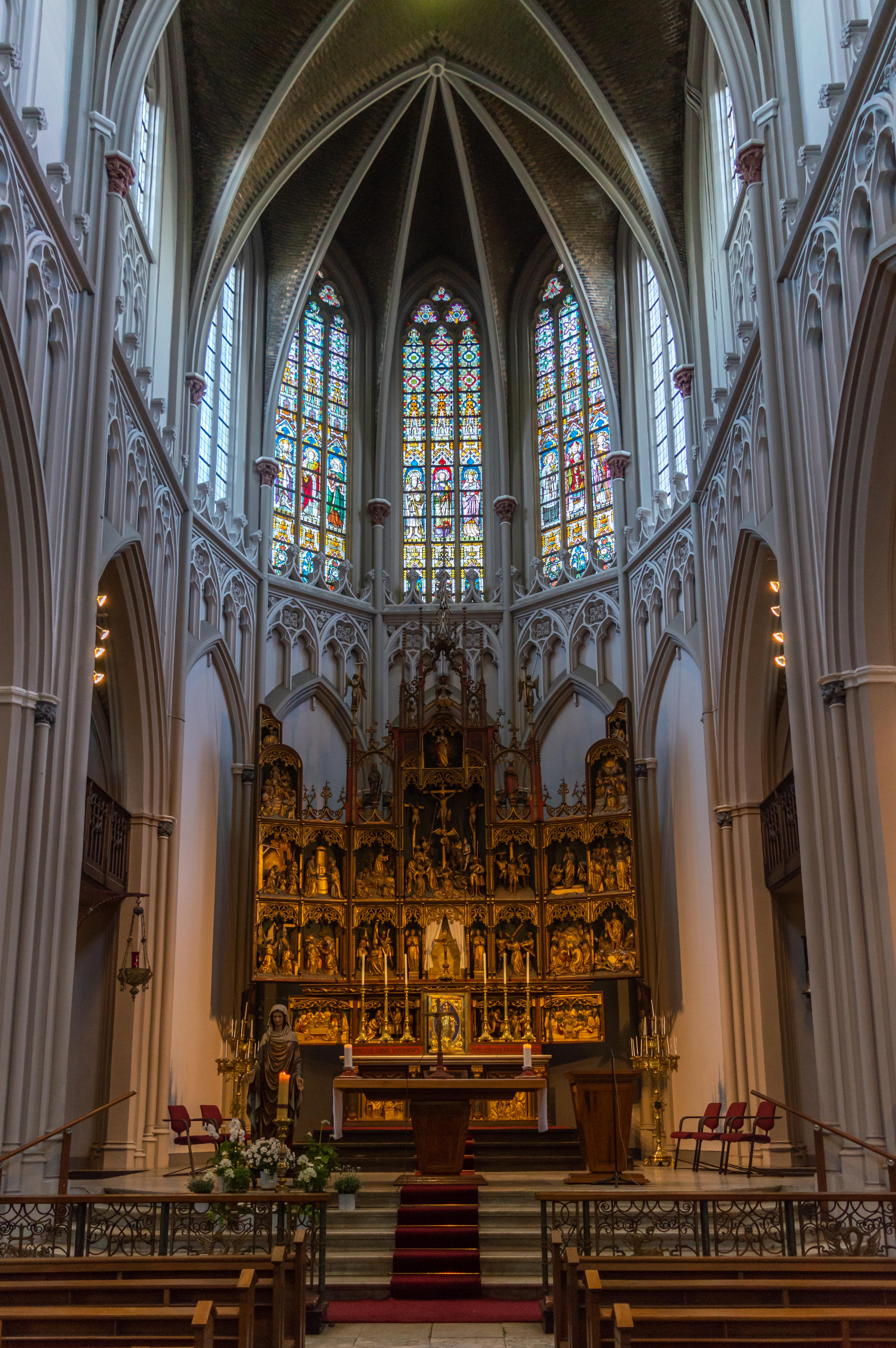
Apse with altarpiece by Hendrik van der Geld (1878–1881)

A winged altarpiece is located in the apse. It was created by Hendrik van der Geld in 1878, costing fl. 4,800. Missing parts were filled in later until it was finished in 1881 except for the wings of the predella. The altarpiece consists of oak and is filled with partly gilded reliefs. The left wing contains images of each of the five Joyful Mysteries of the Rosary, while the middle part depicts the five Sorrowful Mysteries with the relief of the crucifixion of Jesus being larger than the other four. The central part is topped by tracery with statues of the Mother of God, Jesus, two angels, Anthony the Great, and Denis. Reliefs of the five Glorious Mysteries are shown on the right wing.

The predella is located below the main part and has reliefs of the Last Supper, the Passover meal, the sacrifice by Melchizedek, and a meal with twelve people, all concerning the eucharistic celebration. Below that, the base depicts the binding of Isaac, the tree of the knowledge of good and evil, and the rain of manna.

=== Organs ===
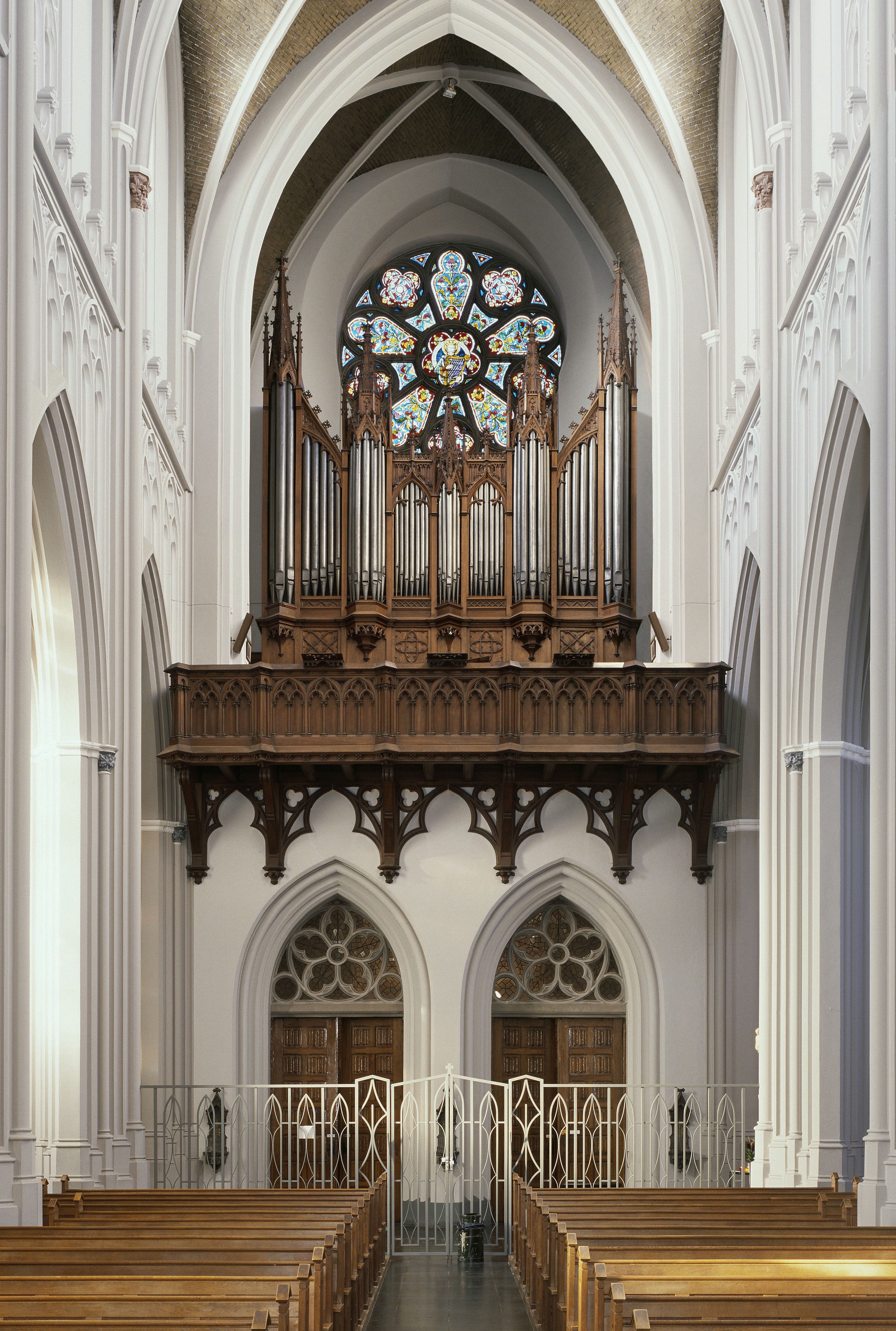
The main organ

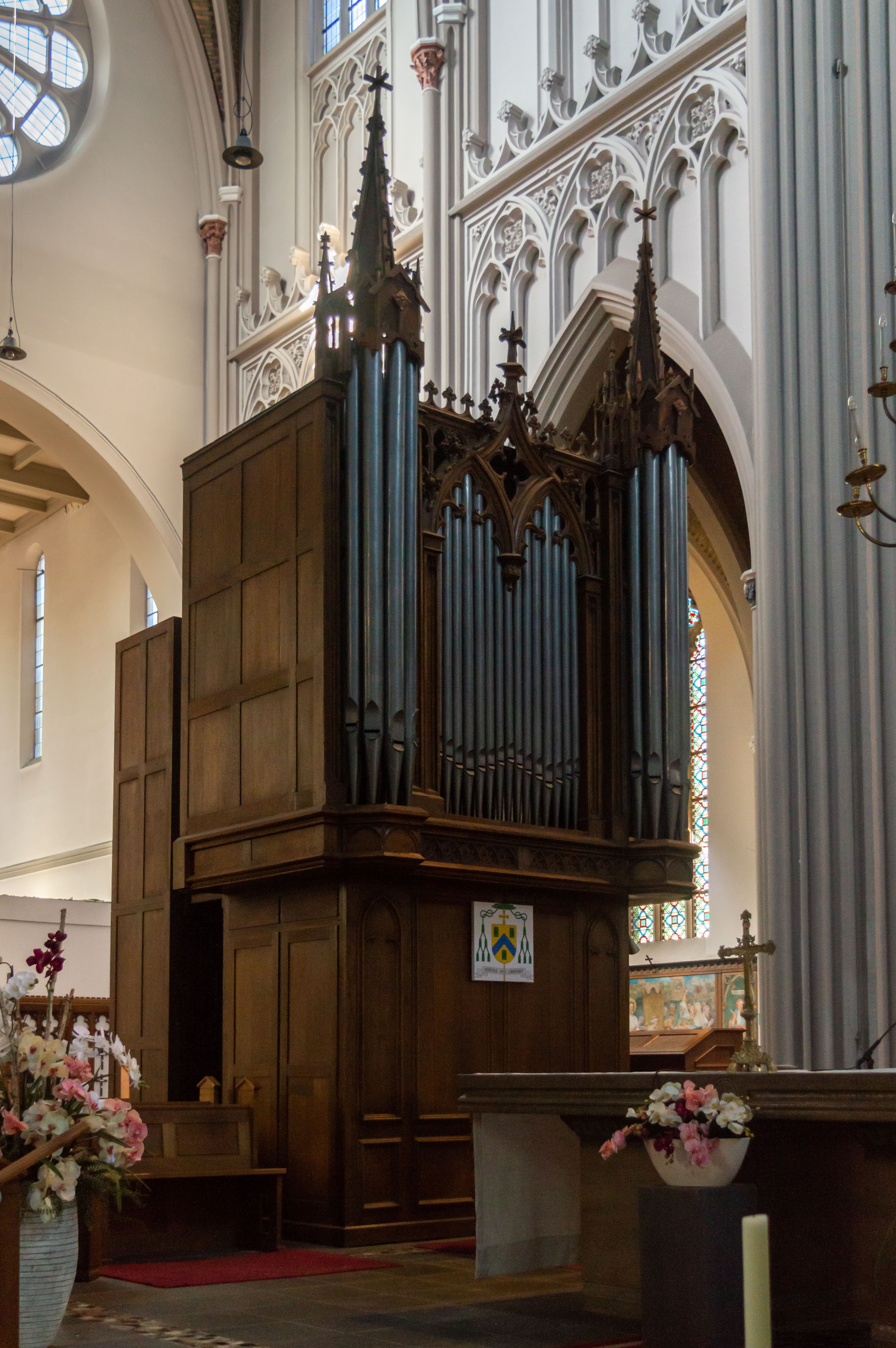
Choir organ

The main organ was finished in 1894 and contains around 1,500 pipes. It was made by organ builder F. C. Smits II and has a neo-Gothic casing, that is shaped as to avoid blocking a rose window behind it. A major renovation took place in 1955, during which the specification was slightly changed. Elbertse Orgelmakers renovated the organ again in 1989–90, partly restoring the original specification:

Hoofdmanuaal, man. I C–g^{3}
| Prestant | 16 vt |
| Principal | 8 vt |
| Bourdon | 16 vt |
| Holpijp | 8 vt |
| Diapason | 4 vt |
| Quint | 3 vt |
| Octaaf | 2 vt |
| Plein Jeu | 3 st. |
| Trompet | 8 vt |
| Clairon | 4 vt |

Echo, man. I
| Gamba | 8 vt |
| Voix celeste | 8 vt |
| Fluit | 8 vt |

Positief, man. II; C–g^{3}
| Principal | 8 vt |
| Holpijp | 8 vt |
| Salicional | 8 vt |
| Octaaf | 4 vt |
| Flûte Octaviante | 4 vt |
| Piccolo | 2 vt |
| Sexquialter | 2 st. |
| Fagot | 16 vt |
| Basson | 8 vt |

Pedaal; C–f^{1}
| Subbas | 16 vt |
| Violon | 16 vt |
| Holpijp | 8 vt |
| Octaaf | 4 vt |
| Bazuin | 16 vt |
| Trompet | 8 vt |

Treden

- Koppel ped.-man.
- Koppel ped.-pos.
- Koppel pos.-man.
- Comb. Hoofdman.
- Comb. Pedaal
- Expressietrede

Besides, the Heuvelse kerk contains a choir organ by the Belgian organ builder François-Bernard Loret. The organ was built in 1859 and used to be located in a church along the Gasthuisstraat. It moved twice within Tilburg before it was acquired by the Heuvelse kerk from the Sint-Theresiakerk in 1998. The latter church had closed down the year before. Subsequently, the organ underwent a restoration, during which two pinnacles decorated with crockets were added on top. The organ was inaugurated in 2008. The specification is as follows:

Manuaal; C–f^{3}
| Bourdon | 16 vt |
| Prestant | 8 vt |
| Bourdon | 8 vt |
| Octaaf | 4 vt |
| Holfluit | 4 vt |
| Cornet | 4 st. |
| Trompet | 8 vt |

Positief; C–f^{3}
| Bourdon | 8 vt |
| Viola | 8 vt |
| Salicet | 4 vt |
| Fluit | 4 vt |
| Flageolet | 2 vt |

Pedaal; C–d^{1}
| Subbas | 16 vt |
| Fluitbas | 8 vt |
| Fagot | 16 vt |

Couplers

- Manuaal + Positief
- Pedaal + Manuaal
- Pedaal + Positief

Before the current main organ was installed, the Heuvelse kerk used to have another organ with mechanical traction constructed by Wander Beekes in 1828. It was purchased by the church in 1874 from a former Utrecht clandestine church along the Heerenstraat. After the second construction phase of the Heuvelse kerk was completed, the organ was moved to a different location within the church. It was sold to the Maria Magdalenakerk in Geffen when the new organ by Smits was completed. The organ had the following specification:

Manuaal
| Prestant | 8 vt |
| Bourdon | 16 vt |
| Holpijp | 8 vt |
| Prestant | 4 vt |
| Quint | 3 vt |
| Octaaf | 2 vt |
| Mixtuur | 4–5 st. bas/disc. |
| Trompet | 8 vt bas/disc. |

Positief
| Holpijp | 8 vt |
| Quintadeen | 8 vt |
| Viool | 8 vt |
| Prestant | 4 vt |
| Fluit | 4 vt |
| Woudfluit | 2 vt |
| Flageolet | 1 vt |
| Fagot | 8 vt bas/disc. |

- Aangehangen pedaal, manuaalkoppel, tremulant

== Gallery ==
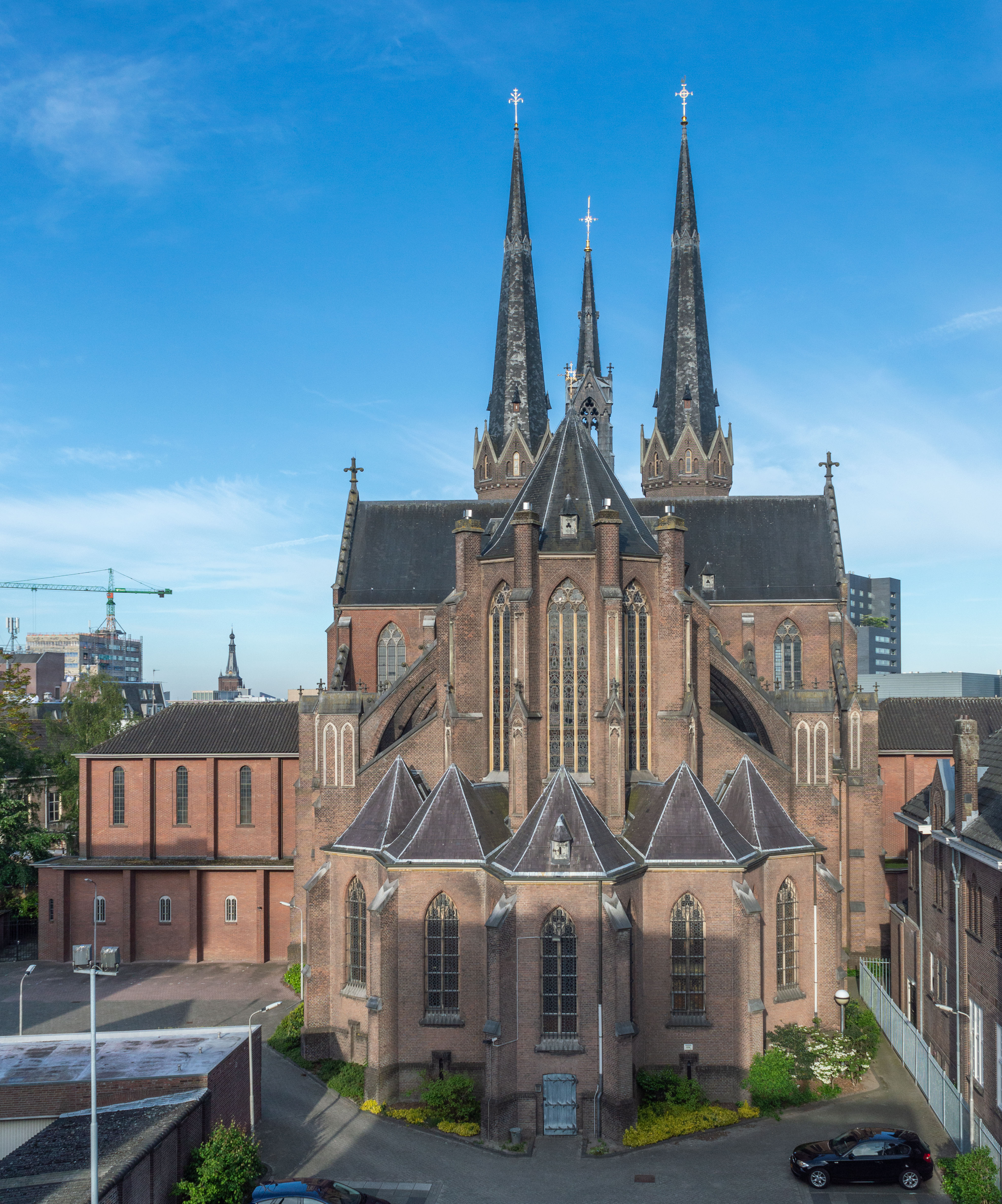
The back of the church featuring flying buttresses

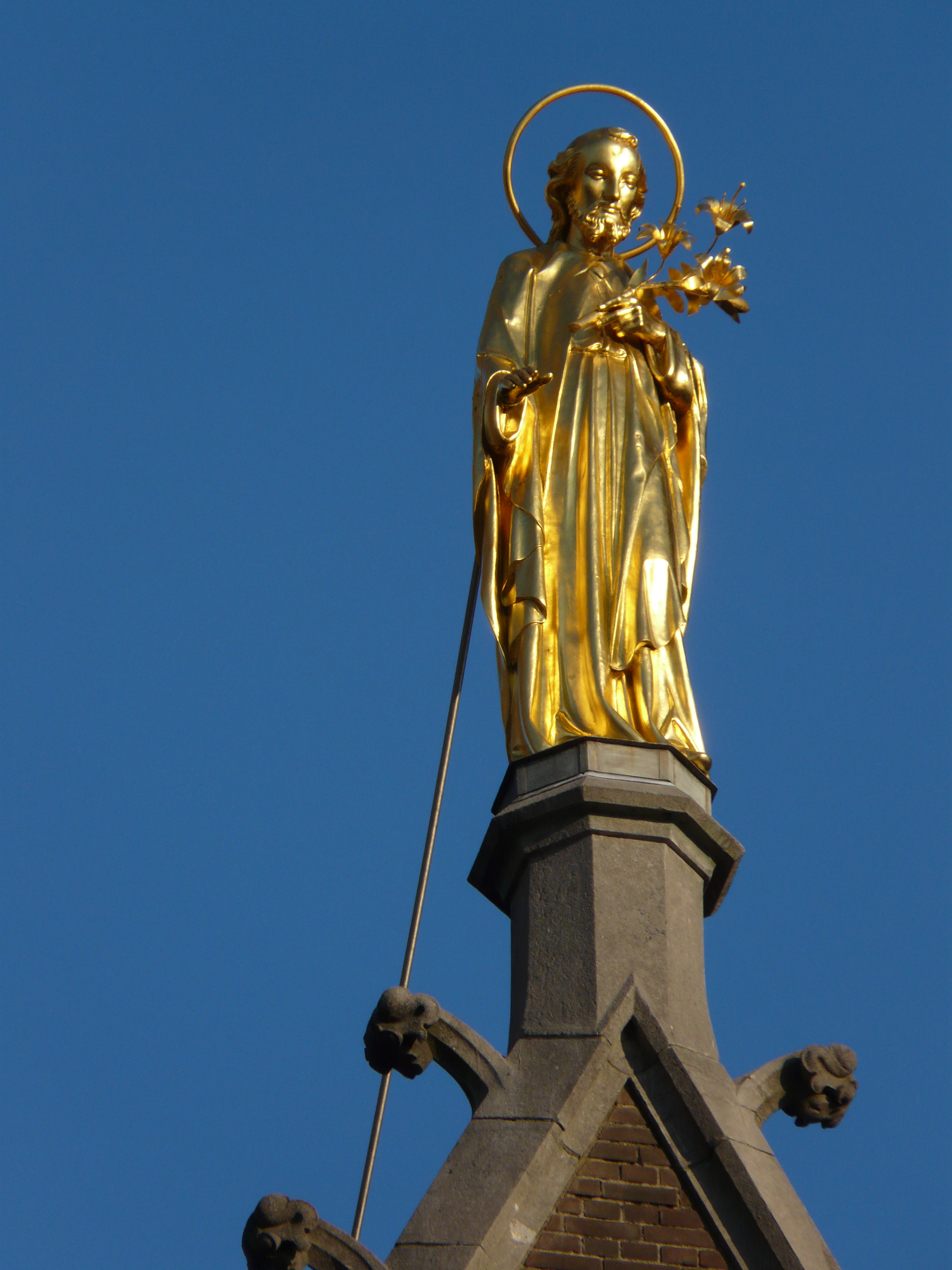
Copper-gilded statue of Saint Joseph on top of the front facade

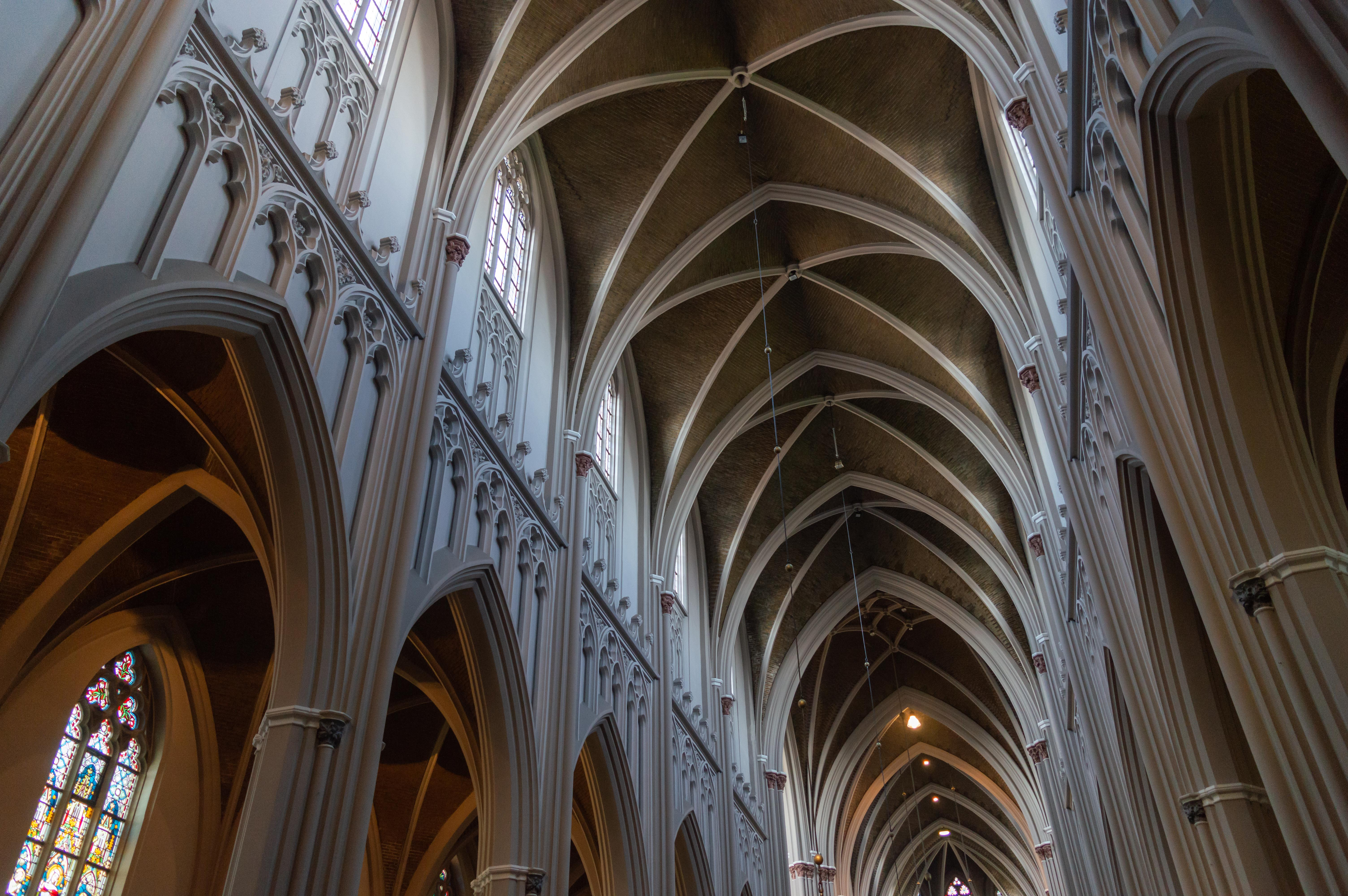
Rib vault of the nave

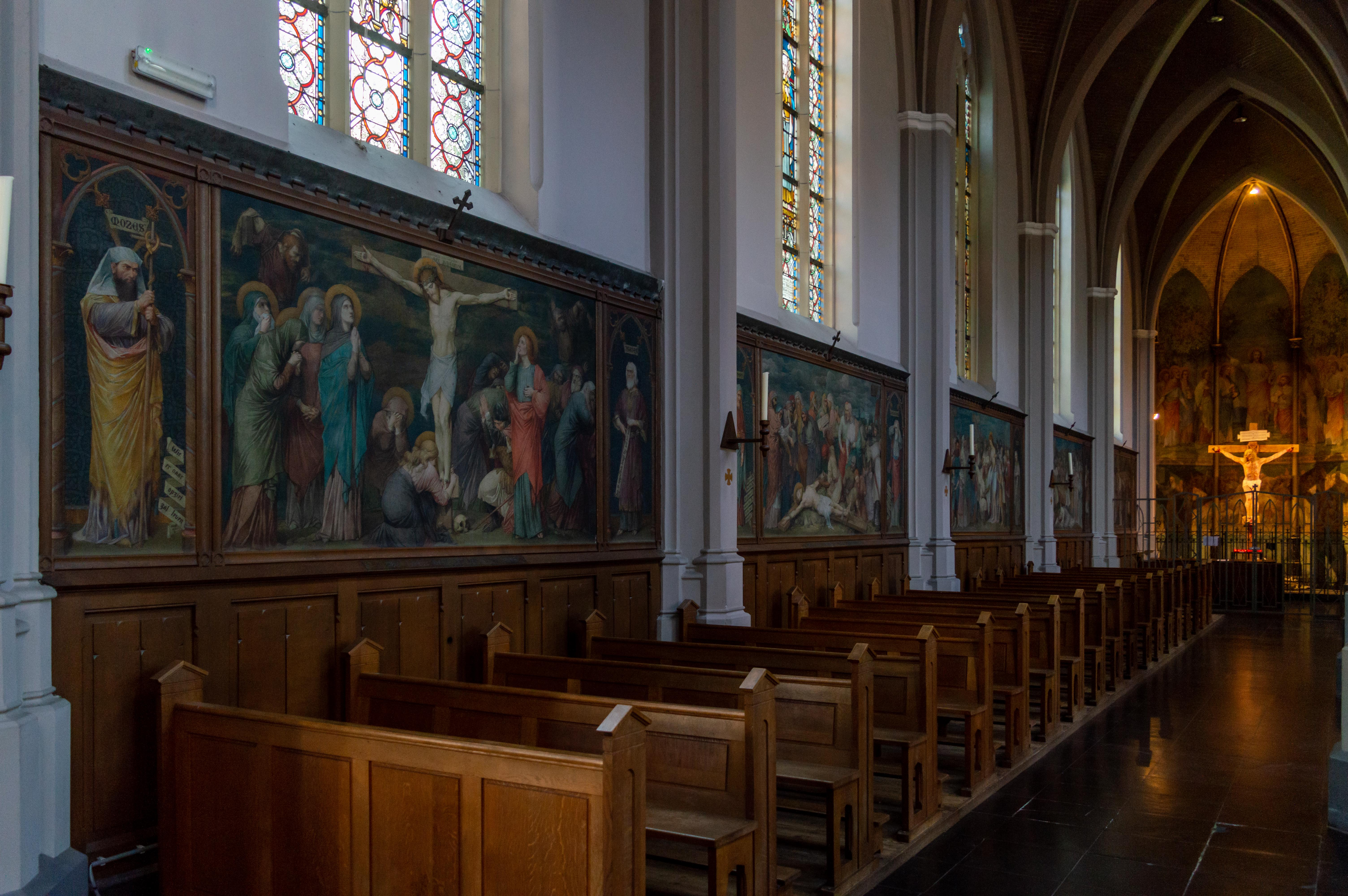
Side aisle with frescos by Georges de Geetere

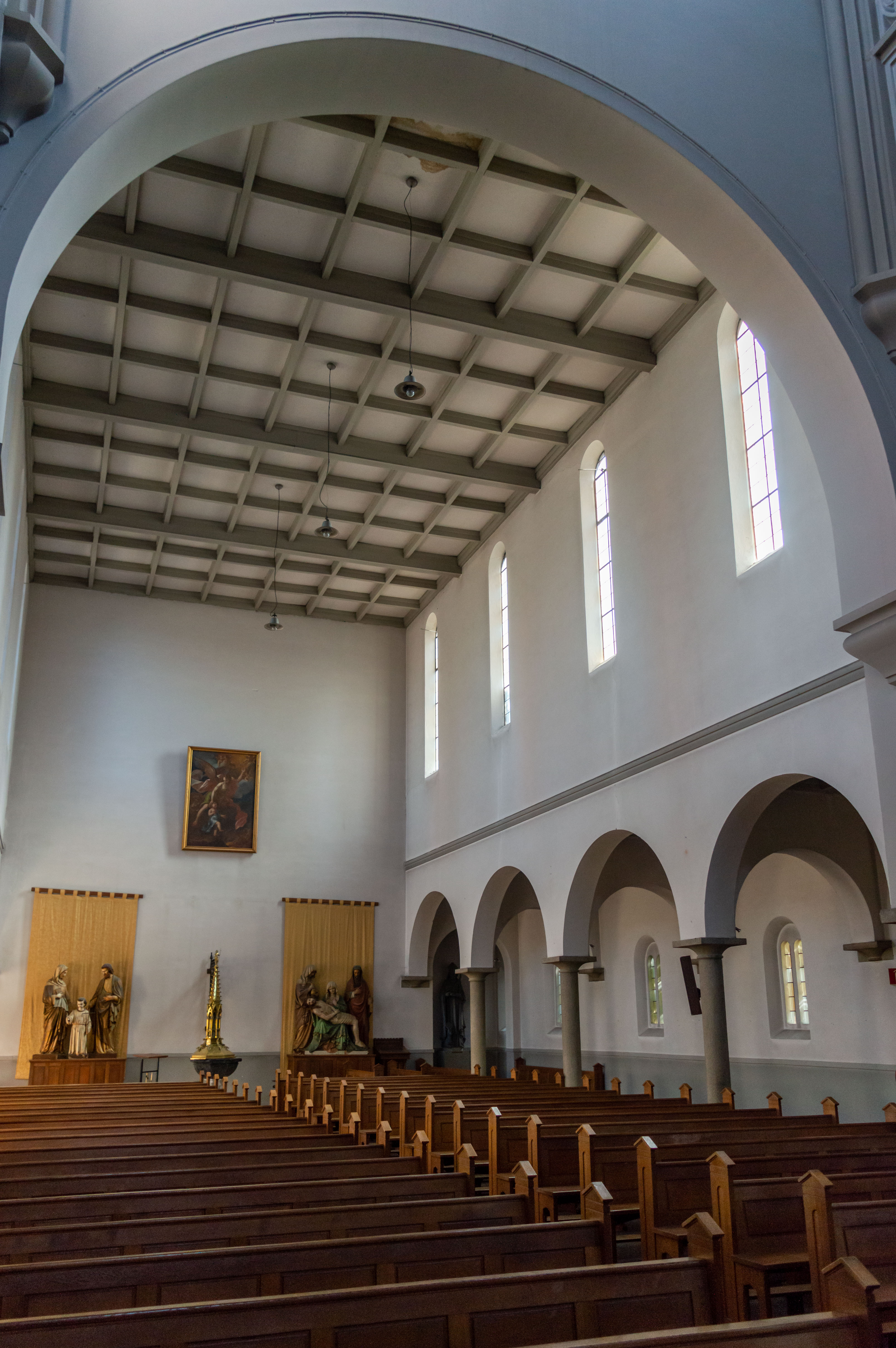
Interior of south extended transept with lower ceiling
