= Henri Mastelyn =

Henri or Hendrik Mastelyn (c. 1565—1641) was a physician to the Brussels court of the Archdukes Albert and Isabella.

== Life ==
Mastelyn was born in Brussels, son to Pierre Mastelyn and Elisabeth Vander Borcht. Having acquired doctorates of philosophy and medicine, he established a medical practice in Brussels. His patients included Magdalena Preudhomme, who from 1593 chronically suffered from a bloody flux that she attributed to witchcraft, and that was miraculously cured in 1603.

In 1606, Mastelyn was appointed personal physician to the Archdukes. He attended upon both Albert (who died in 1621) and Isabella (who died in 1633) during their final illnesses. He is depicted in the official record of Albert's 1622 funeral procession.

In 1618, Mastelyn provided financial support to the first foundation of Mounts of Piety in the Low Countries.

He died in 1641, and was buried in a family crypt in the Dominican church in Brussels. His funeral monument was destroyed by the 1695 Bombardment of Brussels.

== Family ==
On 9 November 1598, Mastelyn married Marie Vanden Wouwere (1569–1648), daughter of Philippe Vanden Wouwere and god-daughter of Laurentius Metsius, dean of Brussels Minster, who would later become bishop of 's-Hertogenbosch. Together they had eight children, including:

- Marc (1599–1652), who became an Augustinian canon
- Catherine, who married Philippe Ryckewaert, knight, lord of Huldenberg, alderman of Brussels, and member of the Council of Brabant
- Philippe, who became secretary of the Council of Brabant
- Marie, who married Hendrik Van den Berghe, lawyer and member of the Council of Brabant.
- Jean, who became canon of the Collegiate Church of Saint-Vincent in Soignies.
- Anne, who became a Franciscan nun in Lier.
