= Clemens Crabbeels =

Bishop of 's-Hertogenbosch

Clemens Crabeels
- Bishop of 's-Hertogenbosch
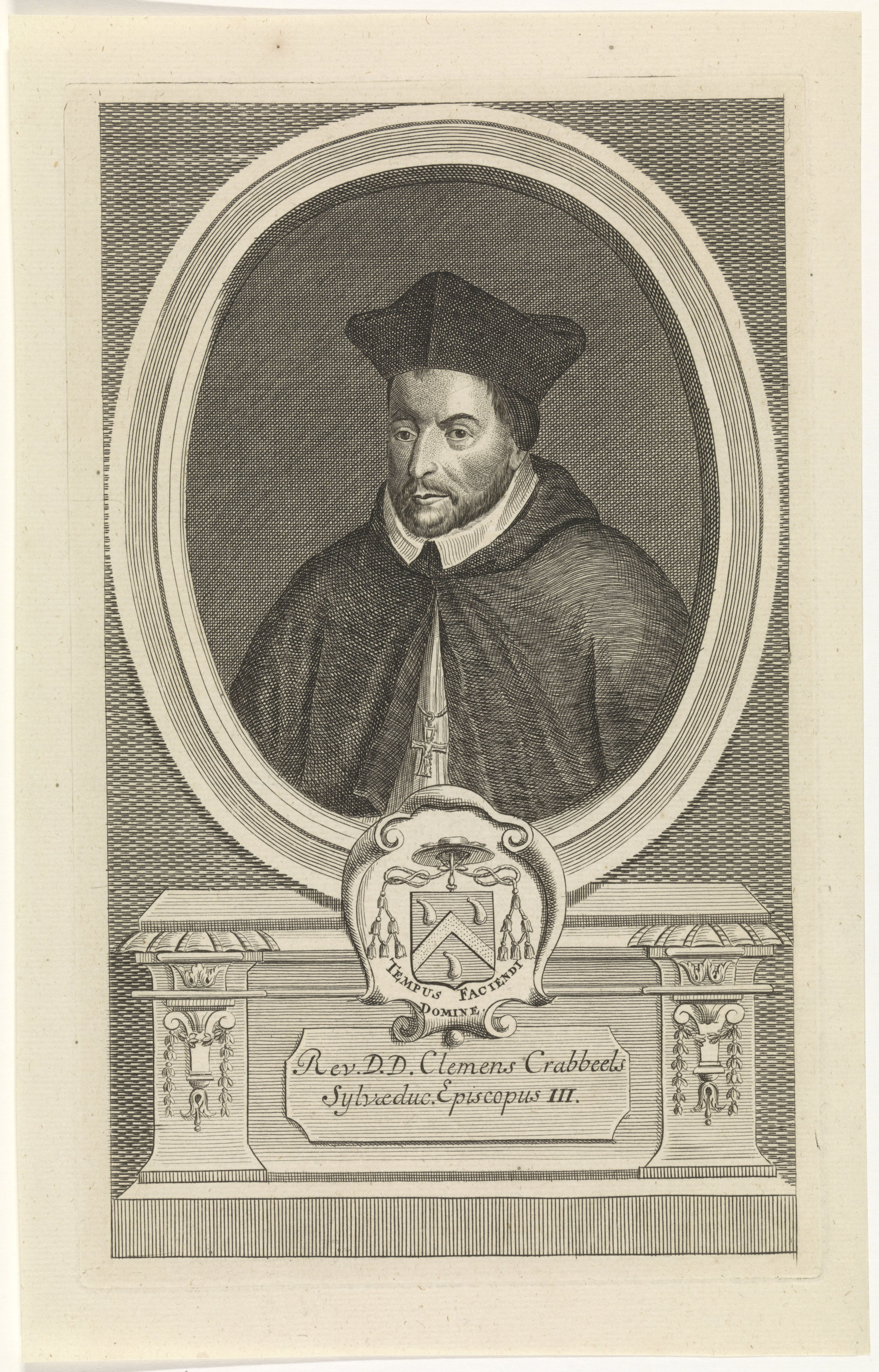
- An engraved portrait of Clemens Crabeels by Jan Baptist Jongelinck
- Diocese: 's-Hertogenbosch
- See: St. John's Cathedral
- In office: 1584–1592
- Predecessor: Laurentius Metsius
- Successor: Ghisbertus Masius

Orders
- Consecration: 6 January 1585

Personal details
- Born: c.1534 Leuven, Duchy of Brabant, Habsburg Netherlands
- Died: 22 October 1592 's-Hertogenbosch, Duchy of Brabant, Habsburg Netherlands
- Education: University of Leuven (Licentiate of Laws)
- Motto: Tempus faciendi domine

Clemens Crabeels (c.1534–1592) was the third bishop of 's-Hertogenbosch, in the Habsburg Netherlands, from 1584 until his death in 1592.

== Life ==
Crabeels was born in Leuven around 1534 and studied at the University of Leuven, graduating Licentiate of Laws. In 1557, he was appointed to a canonry of the collegiate church of St Bavo, in Ghent, which in 1559 was elevated to the status of cathedral. In 1575, at the death of the first bishop of Ghent, he was elected vicar general of the diocese, but was driven from the city by the Calvinist coup of 1578. On 3 September 1584, he was appointed bishop of 's-Hertogenbosch, and was consecrated in Tournai on 6 January 1585. He died in 's-Hertogenbosch on 22 October 1592 and was buried in the choir of his cathedral.

Catholic Church titles
Preceded by Laurentius Metsius	Bishop of 's-Hertogenbosch; 1584–1592	Succeeded by Ghisbertus Masius
