= Antonius Lambertus Maria Hurkmans =

Dutch Catholic bishop

- Bishop Emeritus of ’s-Hertogenbosch
- Church: Catholic Church
- Diocese: Diocese of 's-Hertogenbosch
- In office: 13 June 1998 – 5 March 2016
- Predecessor: Johannes ter Schure
- Successor: Gerard de Korte

Orders
- Ordination: 22 December 1979 by Johannes Bluyssen
- Consecration: 29 August 1998 by Johannes ter Schure

Personal details
- Born: 3 August 1944 (age 81) Someren, Reichskommissariat Niederlande, Nazi Germany
- Coat of arms

Antonius Lambertus Maria Hurkmans (born 3 August 1944) is Bishop emeritus of the Roman Catholic Diocese of 's-Hertogenbosch. His motto is: Sancti Spiritus In virtute (The power of the Holy Spirit).

== Early years and calling to the priesthood ==
Antoon Hurkmans was born in Someren and grew up in a farming family of nine children. He took his vegetable and grocery diploma and had his own grocery store in Echt, Netherlands. Because he felt called to the priesthood, he sold his shop and then studied at the College for Late Vocations in Warnsveld. In 1966 he went to the Latin School in Gemert and three years later he spent some time in the Grimbergen Abbey, Belgium. In 1972 Hurkmans left the monastery and went to study theology at the Tilburg University, where he received his doctorate in 1978.

== Ecclesiastical career ==
Hurkmans was ordained priest on 22 December 1979 by Bishop Johannes Bluyssen. He then worked in Waalwijk (Saint Anthony Parish), from December 1, 1980, as pastor. Monsignor Johannes Gerardus ter Schure appointed him in August 1987 rector of the new seminary, St. John's Centre. In March 1988 he became vicar general and provost (religion) of the cathedral chapter of the Roman Catholic Diocese of 's-Hertogenbosch. Because of his merits for the seminary Pope John Paul II appointed him on his birthday in 1994 Honorary prelate and Monsignor. The pope appointed him bishop for the Roman Catholic Diocese of 's-Hertogenbosch in June 1998. On August 29, 1998, he was consecrated bishop by Johannes Gerardus ter Schure, Johannes Bluyssen, Martinus Petrus Maria Muskens, Frans Wiertz and Joseph Frans Lescrauwaet. Hurkmans resigned his bishopry in 2016 and was replaced by Gerard Johannes Nicolaas De Korte. Hurkmans is a former Grand Prior of the NetherlandsLieutenancy of the Equestrian Order of the Holy Sepulchre of Jerusalem.
