= Ghisbertus Masius =

- Bishop of 's-Hertogenbosch
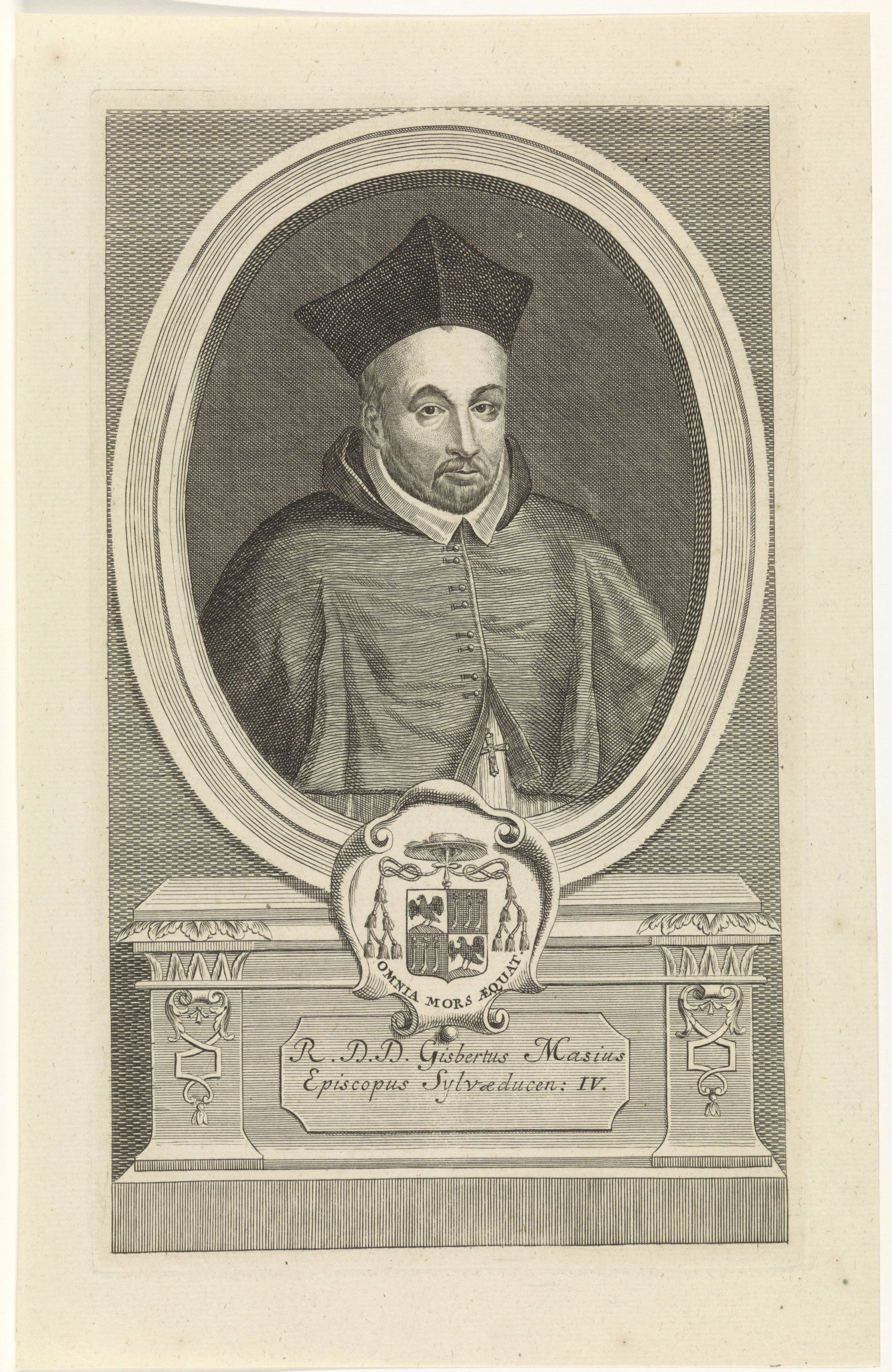
- An engraved portrait of Ghisbertus Masius by Jan Baptist Jongelinck
- Diocese: 's-Hertogenbosch
- See: St. John's Cathedral
- In office: 1593–1614
- Predecessor: Clemens Crabbeels
- Successor: Nicolaus Zoesius

Orders
- Consecration: 7 March 1594

Personal details
- Born: c. 1545 Den Bommel, County of Holland, Habsburg Netherlands
- Died: 2 July 1614
- Education: Licentiate of Sacred Theology
- Alma mater: University of Leuven
- Motto: Omnia mors æquat (Death levels all)

Ghisbertus Masius (c. 1545 – 1614) was the fourth bishop of 's-Hertogenbosch, in the Habsburg Netherlands, and sat in the Estates General of 1600 as a representative of the First Estate.

== Life ==
Masius was born in Den Bommel around 1545 and studied at the University of Leuven, graduating Licentiate of Sacred Theology. He was appointed to a canonry of St. John's Cathedral, 's-Hertogenbosch, in 1579. On 1 November 1593, he was appointed bishop, and was consecrated in Brussels on 7 March 1594, taking possession of his see on 25 March. During the Siege of 's-Hertogenbosch in 1601, he was active in his support of the city's defenders.

Masius commissioned a catechism, the Catechismus voor de Catholijke jonckheijt des bisdoms van 's Hertoghenbosche, based on the Mechelen Catechism drafted by Lodewijk Makeblijde. In February 1612, he ordered that this be the basis of all religious instruction in the parishes and schools of his diocese. On 9 and 10 October 1612, Masius presided at the second diocesan synod of 's-Hertogenbosch, the statutes of which were printed at Cologne in 1613.

Masius died on 2 July 1614 and was buried in his cathedral. He had been a friend and correspondent of Francis de Sales.

Catholic Church titles
Preceded by Clemens Crabbeels	Bishop of 's-Hertogenbosch; 1593–1614	Succeeded by Nicolaus Zoesius
