= Laurentius Metsius =

- Bishop of 's-Hertogenbosch
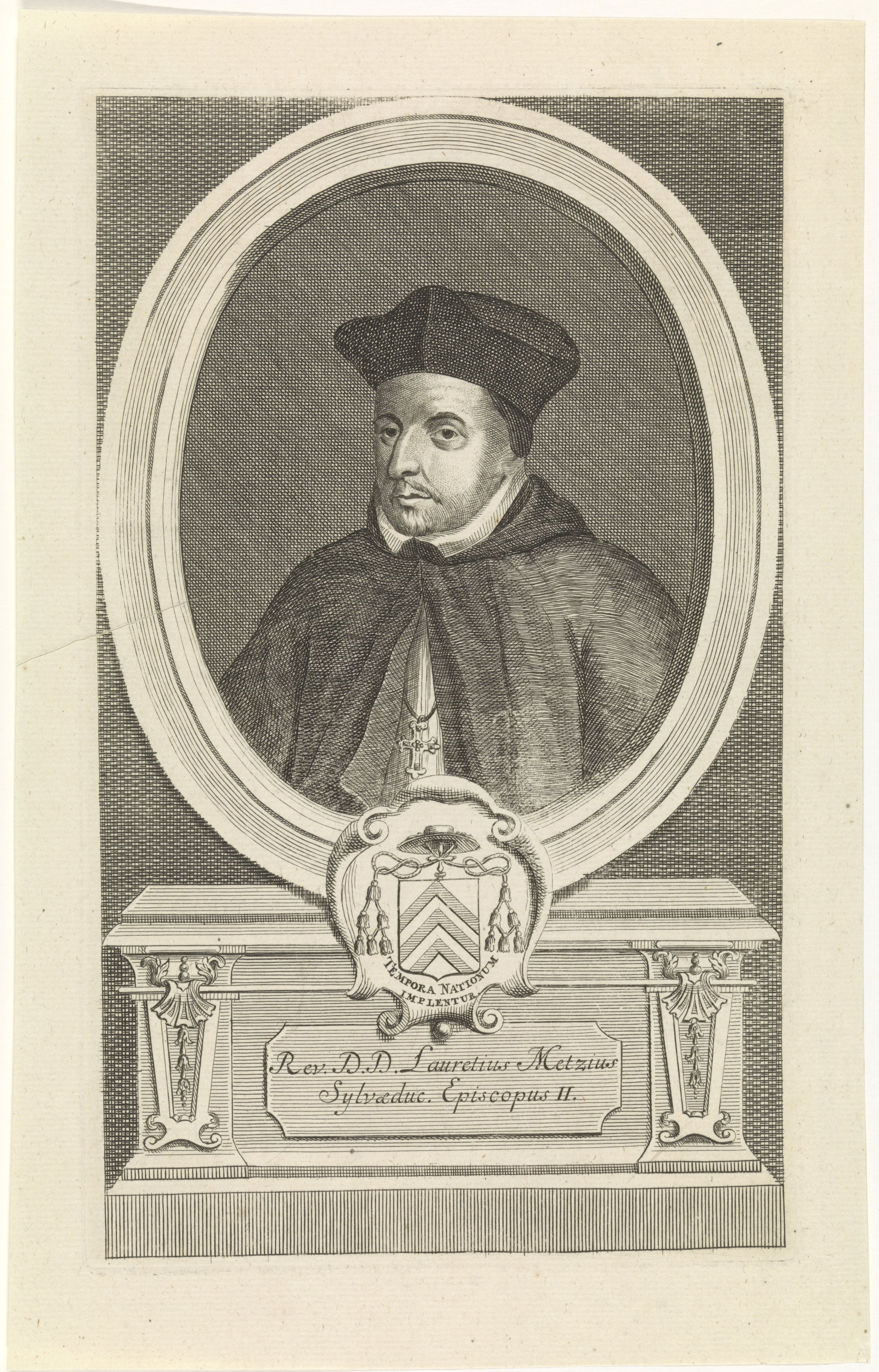
- An engraved portrait of Laurentius Metsius by Jan Baptist Jongelinck
- Native name: Laurent van Mets
- Diocese: 's-Hertogenbosch
- See: St. John's Cathedral
- In office: 1570–1580
- Predecessor: Franciscus Sonnius
- Successor: Clemens Crabbeels

Orders
- Consecration: 23 April 1570

Personal details
- Born: c.1520 Oudenaarde, County of Flanders, Habsburg Netherlands
- Died: 18 September 1580 Namur, County of Namur, Habsburg Netherlands
- Education: Licentiate of Sacred Theology
- Alma mater: University of Leuven
- Motto: Tempora nationum implentur

Laurentius Metsius (c.1520–1580) was the second bishop of 's-Hertogenbosch, in the Habsburg Netherlands. As ex officio abbot of the Abbey of Tongerlo he sat in the First Estate of the States of Brabant during the early years of the Dutch Revolt.

== Life ==
Metsius was born in Oudenaarde around 1520 and studied at the University of Leuven, graduating Licentiate of Sacred Theology. In 1557, he was appointed to a canonry of the Collegiate Church of St. Michael and St. Gudula (future cathedral of Brussels), becoming dean in 1563. Philip II of Spain named Metsius to the see of 's-Hertogenbosch on 16 November 1569, and Pope Pius V confirmed the nomination on 13 March 1570. Metsius received episcopal consecration at the hands of Maximilian de Berghes, Archbishop of Cambrai, in St Gudula's on 23 April 1570. He made his entry into his see on 8 May 1570.

On 8–10 May 1571, Metsius presided at the first diocesan synod of 's-Hertogenbosch, the statutes of which were published as Statuta primæ synodi diœcesanæ Buscoducensis. In 1572, he issued a Manual for the diocese, Manuale Pastorum sive formula aut ritus administrandi sacramenta pro diœcesi Buscoducensi.

As a member of the States of Brabant, Metsius was a signatory to the 1577 Union of Brussels, but his loyalty to the traditional order made him suspect to the rebels. In October 1577, he fled 's-Hertogenbosch, finding refuge first in Cleves and later in Namur. In 1579, he served as vicar general of the diocese of Namur, while the see was vacant, himself consecrating the new bishop, François de Wallon-Cappelle, in 1580. He died in Namur the same year and was buried in the church of St Aubin.

Catholic Church titles
Preceded by Franciscus Sonnius	Bishop of 's-Hertogenbosch; 1570–1580	Succeeded by Clemens Crabbeels
