= Johannes Bluyssen =

20th and 21st-century Dutch Catholic bishop

Johannes Willem Maria Bluyssen
- Bishop of ’s-Hertogenbosch
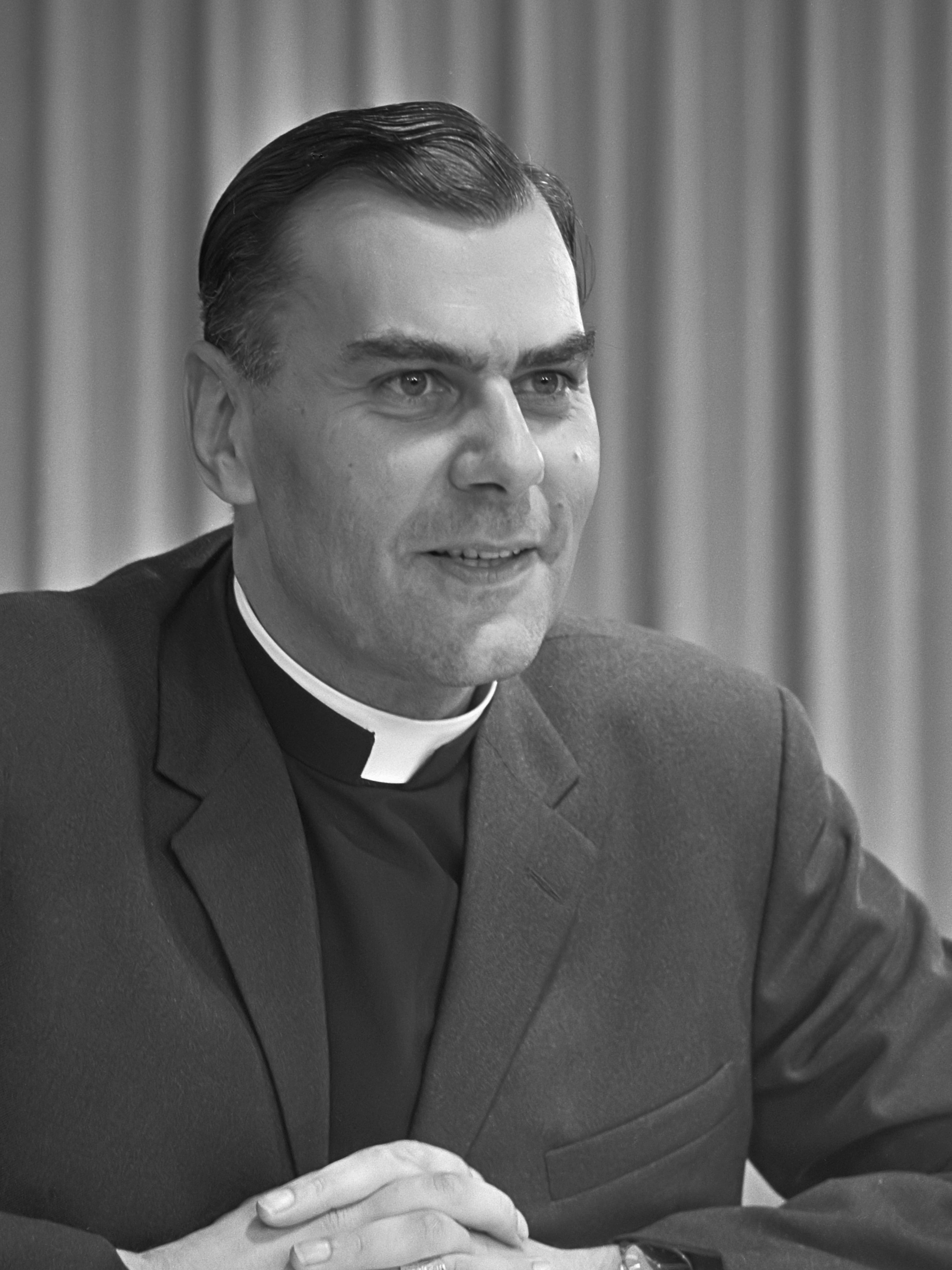
- Johannes Bluyssen in 1968
- Native name: Johannes Wilhelmus Maria Bluyssen
- Church: Catholic Church
- Diocese: Diocese of 's-Hertogenbosch
- In office: 11 October 1966 – 1 March 1984
- Predecessor: Wilhelmus Marinus Bekkers
- Successor: Johannes ter Schure
- Previous posts: Titular Bishop of Aëtus (1961-1966); Auxiliary Bishop of ’s-Hertogenbosch (1961-1966)

Orders
- Ordination: 3 June 1950 by Wilhelmus Mutsaerts
- Consecration: 27 December 1961 by Wilhelmus Marinus Bekkers

Personal details
- Born: 10 April 1926 Nijmegen, Gelderland, Netherlands
- Died: 8 August 2013 (aged 87) 's-Hertogenbosch, North Brabant, Netherlands

Johannes Willem Maria Bluyssen or Bluijssen (10 April 1926 in Nijmegen − 8 August 2013) was a Dutch Catholic bishop.

== Life ==
Ordained to the priesthood in 1950, Bluyssen attained a degree in theology and was professor for Spirituality at the seminary. At the age of 35, younger than any Dutchman since the Reformation, he was appointed titular bishop of Aëtus and auxiliary bishop of the Roman Catholic Diocese of 's-Hertogenbosch, Netherlands in 1961 and was named bishop of the diocese in 1966, after his predecessor, the outspoken bishop Willem Marinus Bekkers, died only 58 years old (brain tumor). Bluyssen resigned in 1984 for health reasons following an open heart surgery. He died after a short illness on 8 August 2013, aged 87, in 's-Hertogenbosch.

Bluyssen was the last living Dutch bishop who actually took part in the Second Vatican Council. Furthermore he was able to celebrate his 50th anniversary of his episcopacy, a rare jubilee. At that particular time the Church in the Netherlands was heavily buried under sexual scandals by priests and religious of minors. Bluyssen called off all the already planned festivities, telling it was not a time for a feast but for shame.

In Bluyssen's years as an ordinary Bluyssen was just like his predecessor Bekkers, be it less outspoken, a strong believer in the aggiornamento, the renewal of his Church. Rather than renewal he saw to his grief a period where many quit the priesthood and the religious life, the Church participation declined and serious discord spread among Catholics, clergy and bishops. In his almost 30 years as an emeritus he published four books, mainly in the field of his earlier profession, spirituality.
