= Gerard de Korte =

Dutch Roman Catholic bishop (born 1955)

His Excellency Gerard de Korte
- Bishop of 's-Hertogenbosch
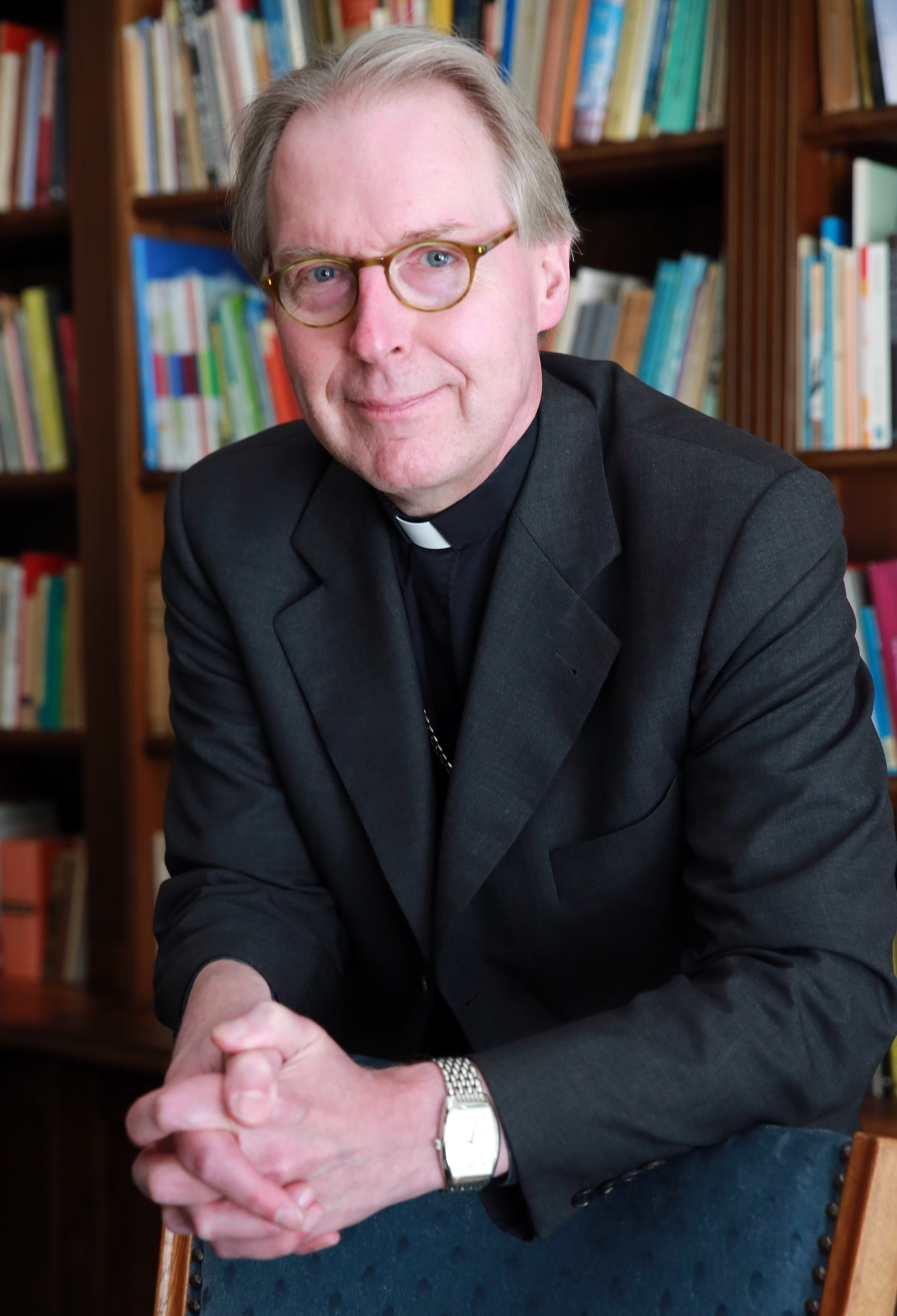
- Bishop de Korte in 2012
- Church: Roman Catholic
- Province: Utrecht
- Diocese: Roman Catholic Diocese of 's-Hertogenbosch
- Installed: 14 May 2016
- Term ended: present
- Predecessor: Antoon Hurkmans
- Other posts: Auxiliary bishop of Utrecht (2001–2008); Titular Bishop of Cesarea in Mauretania (2001–2008)

Orders
- Ordination: 5 September 1987 by Adrianus Johannes Simonis
- Consecration: 2 June 2001 by Adrianus Johannes Simonis

Personal details
- Born: Gerard Johannes Nicolaus de Korte; 13 June 1955 (age 70) Vianen, Netherlands
- Denomination: Roman Catholic
- Motto: Confidens in Christo
- Coat of arms

Gerard Johannes Nicolaus de Korte (Dutch pronunciation: [ˈɣeːrɑr tɕoːˈɦɑnəs ˈnikoːlʌuz də ˈkɔrtə]; (Note: In isolation, Gerard, Johannes and Nicolaus are pronounced [ˈɣeːrɑrt], [joːˈɦɑnəs] and [ˈnikoːlʌus], respectively.) born 13 June 1955) is a Dutch Roman Catholic prelate and Bishop of 's-Hertogenbosch. He was bishop of the diocese of Groningen-Leeuwarden from 2008 to 2016. Before that he was auxiliary bishop of the Archdiocese of Utrecht and dean of the deanery IJsellanden. His motto is Confidens in Christo (Trust in Christ).

== Early life and education ==
Gerard Johannes Nicolaus de Korte was born on 13 June 1955 in Vianen in the Netherlands. He was the youngest of three children.

De Korte graduated in 1974 from the Alberdingk Thijmcollege in Hilversum. He studied history at the Rijksuniversiteit Utrecht from 1974 to 1980. During this time De Korte got more interested in religion and the Church. While writing his final thesis he received certificates in Greek and Latin. He graduated in 1980. Soon after that he became a student at the Katholieke Theologische Universiteit in Utrecht. After graduation, he decided to study theology. In 1984 he became a seminarian at the Ariënskonvikt of the Archdiocese of Utrecht. He graduated from his theology studies in 1987. In 1994 he was promoted to doctor of theology on a thesis titled Priesthood of reconciliation. Possibilities and borders of the theology of the word, especially that of Eduard Thurneysen, for Catholic pastoral care.

== Church career ==
Following his priestly ordination in 1987 he became a member of the staff of the Ariënskovikt seminary. he was also appointed as parish priest of the Cathedral of St. Catharina in Utrecht. From 1992 to 1999 he was rector of the Ariënskonvikt. In 1999 he was appointed to dean of Salland, which was merged with the deanery of Veluwe-Flevoland to form the deanery of IJsellanden. As such he was also a member of the bishop's council.

Pope John Paul II appointed Gerard de Korte as auxiliary bishop of the Archdiocese of Utrecht on 11 April 2001 and as titular bishop of Caesarea in Mauritania. Cardinal Simonis also appointed him as diocesan vicar. His primary duty was in the fields of catechesis and liturgy. Within the conference of bishops he was responsible for Church and Society.

On 18 June 2008, Pope Benedict XVI appointed him bishop of the diocese of Groningen-Leeuwarden, succeeding Msgr. Eijk who had been made Archbishop of Utrecht earlier that year. De Korte was enthroned on 13 September 2008.

In March 2016 was announced that De Korte will succeed Bishop Hurkmans as bishop of the Diocese of 's-Hertogenbosch, the most populous diocese in the Netherlands.

as auxiliary bishop

== Ordinations ==
Styles of Gerard Johannes Nicolaus de Korte
- Reference style: Most Reverend
- Spoken style: Your Excellency
- Religious style: Bishop

- Deacon - 10 January 1987 by Cardinal Simonis in the Cathedral of Saint Catherine in Utrecht.
- Priest - 5 September 1987 by Cardinal Simonis in the church of Saint Aloysius in Utrecht.
- Bishop - 2 June 2001 by Cardinal Simonis, Cardinal Willebrands and Bishop Johannes Antonius de Kok in St Catherine's Cathedral, Utrecht.

== Notes ==
Catholic Church titles
| Preceded by Wim Eijk | Bishop of Groningen-Leeuwarden; 2008–2016 | Vacant |
| Preceded by Antoon Hurkmans | Bishop of 's-Hertogenbosch; 2016–present | Incumbent |
