= Diocese of 's-Hertogenbosch =

Latin Catholic territory in the Netherlands

Coordinates: 51.6881°N 5.3083°E

Diocese of 's-Hertogenbosch Dioecesis Buscoducensis Bisdom 's-Hertogenbosch

Catholic
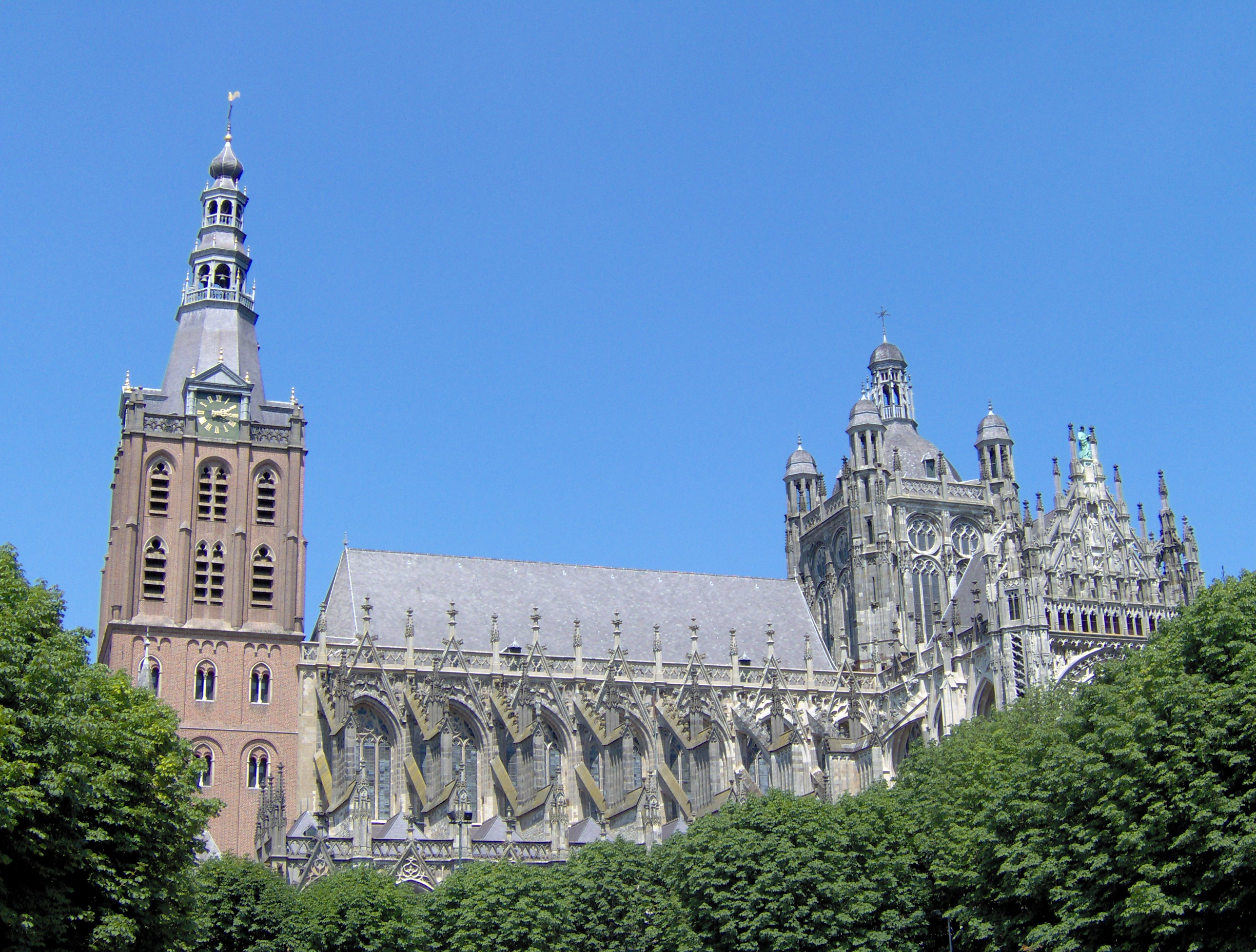
- Cathedral Basilica of Saint John the Evangelist

- Coat of arms

Location
- Country: Netherlands

Statistics
- Area: 3,826 km^{2} (1,477 sq mi)
- Population: Total; Catholics: (as of 2020); 2,155,280; 1,045,470 (48.5%)

Information
- Denomination: Catholic Church
- Sui iuris church: Latin Church
- Rite: Roman Rite
- Established: 12 May 1559
- Cathedral: Cathedral Basilica of Saint John the Evangelist

Current leadership
- Pope: Leo XIV
- Bishop: Gerard de Korte
- Metropolitan Archbishop: Cardinal Wim Eijk
- Auxiliary Bishops: Robertus G L M Mutsaerts

Map
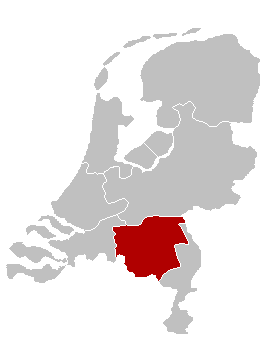
- Location of the Diocese of 's-Hertogenbosch

Website
- Official website

The Diocese of 's-Hertogenbosch (Latin: Dioecesis Buscoducensis) is a Latin Church ecclesiastical jurisdiction or diocese of the Catholic Church in the Netherlands. The modern diocese was created in 1853. It is a suffragan of the Archdiocese of Utrecht. It is currently led by bishop Gerard de Korte. Its see is St John's Cathedral, 's-Hertogenbosch.

== History ==
The city of 's-Hertogenbosch (Hertzogenbusch, Sylva Ducis) was founded in 1184, but with the surrounding territory, was included in the Diocese of Liège until 12 March 1561. At that time, to check the spread of Protestantism, Pope Pius IV raised it to the dignity of a see, and made it suffragan to the archdiocese of Mechelen. The first bishop was the theologian Francis Sonnius (1562–69), afterwards transferred to the see of Antwerp. His successors suffered in the political disorders and wars of the last quarter of the 16th century.

When after a long siege the city was captured by Prince Frederick Henry (14 September 1629) and held in the name of the States-General, the sixth bishop, Michael Ophovius, was obliged to abandon his see, which he did in a solemn procession, surrounded by his clergy, and bearing with him a famous miraculous statue of the Blessed Virgin which he placed in safety at Brussels.

Joseph de Bergaigne (1638–47) was little more than bishop in name. He was unable to assert his right to the see, and exercised his functions as best he could from Geldrop. By the Treaty of Westphalia (1648) the entire territory of the diocese was recognized as a permanent conquest of the Dutch Republic, and made directly subject to the jurisdiction of the States General. The exercise of the Catholic religion was forbidden by law, and the pertinent decrees were applied with rigour. Roman Catholic priests, however, continued their ministry in secret. The diocese became a simple mission, governed by a Vicar Apostolic who was usually a titular bishop.

The diocese of 's-Hertogenbosch was administered in this fashion until 1853. In 1810 Napoleon had tried to create another diocese under that name, inclusive of the territory known as the Bouches du Rhin, and obtained a titular for the new see in the person of the imperial courtier, Monsignor Van Camp. A similar failure awaited the attempt, authorized by the Concordat of 27 August 1827, to divide all of the Netherlands into two large dioceses, Amsterdam and 's-Hertogenbosch.

The ancient see was finally revived by Pope Pius IX on the occasion of the restoration of the hierarchy in the Netherlands, where, since 1848, the revised constitution has assured Catholics full political and religious liberty. Together with three other Dutch sees, 's-Hertogenbosch was re-established by the pontifical Breve of 4 March 1853, and with its former limits; all four sees were made suffragan to Utrecht. Jan Zwijsen, a native of the diocese and its most illustrious son, hitherto vicar-Apostolic, was the first bishop of the re-established see, though temporarily he was known as administrator-Apostolic, since he was already Archbishop of Utrecht, with which office he was to unite the government of 's-Hertogenbosch.

In 1865, the first provincial synod was held there. In 1868 he resigned the archiepiscopal See of Utrecht, but continued the administration of 's-Hertogenbosch. He was succeeded by Adrianus Godschalk, who died in 1892, leaving the see to be filled by Bishop William van den Ven. The above-mentioned miraculous statue of the Blessed Virgin was restored to the cathedral. During the 1960s, the relatively strong demarcation between the Catholic south on one side and the Calvinist west and north on the other side of the Netherlands started to diminish. In the second half of the 20th century a rapid rise of secularization and strong loss of religious affiliation took place in North Brabant.

In 2006, slightly more than half of the Brabantian people identified with Catholicism. In the Diocese of 's-Hertogenbosch, the eastern part of North Brabant and part of the province of Gelderland, 1,167,000 people felt associated with the Roman Catholic belief system (56.8 percent of the population). Only 45,645 residents of this area attend the mass, which is only 2 percent of the total population of the area and consists mostly of people over 65 years old.

North Brabant is mostly Roman Catholic by tradition and still uses the term and certain traditions as a base for its cultural identity, though the vast majority of the population is now largely irreligious in practice. Research among Dutch Roman Catholics in 2006 shows that only 27% of Dutch Catholics can be regarded as theist, 55% as ietsist/agnostic theist and 17% as agnostic.

== Bishops of 's-Hertogenbosch since 1853 ==
- Johannes Zwijsen (Zwysen) (13 Oct 1851 Succeeded - 16 Oct 1877 Died)
- Adrianus Godschalk (8 Jan 1878 Appointed - 4 Jan 1892 Died)
- Wilhelmus van de Ven (27 May 1892 Appointed - 22 Dec 1919 Died)
- Arnold Frans Diepen (24 Dec 1919 Succeeded - 18 Mar 1943 Died)
- Willem Pieter Adriaan Maria Mutsaerts (18 Mar 1943 Succeeded - 27 Jun 1960 Resigned)
- Wilhelmus Marinus Bekkers (27 Jun 1960 Succeeded - 9 May 1966 Died)
- Johannes Willem Maria Bluyssen (Bluijssen) (11 Oct 1966 Appointed - 1 Mar 1984 Resigned)
- Joannes Gerardus ter Schure, S.D.B. (31 Jan 1985 Appointed - 13 Jun 1998 Retired)
- Antonius Lambertus Maria Hurkmans (13 Jun 1998 Appointed - 5 Mar 2016 Resigned)
- Gerard Johannes Nicolaus de Korte (5 Mar 2016 Appointed - )

== See also ==
- Catholic Church in the Netherlands
